= List of Alpha Tau Omega members =

Alpha Tau Omega is an American social fraternity founded at the Virginia Military Institute in 1865. The following is a list of notable Alpha Tau Omega members. Dates are the dates of joining.

== Academia ==
- Bob Clement (University of Tennessee), president of Cumberland University and US House of Representatives
- Karl Taylor Compton: President of MIT
- John Garland James (VMI): 2nd president of Texas A&M University(1879–1883), president of Texas Military Institute(1868–1879)
- Hardaway Hunt Dinwiddie (VMI): 4th president of Texas A&M University(1883–1887)
- Frank Hereford: former president of the University of Virginia
- Stephen C. O'Connell: Justice and Chief Justice, Florida Supreme Court (1955–1967) and President of the University of Florida (1967–1973)
- Santa Ono (Emory, honorary), 28th president of University of Cincinnati and 15th president of University of Michigan
- Blake R. Van Leer: fifth president of Georgia Institute of Technology, founder of Southern Polytechnic State University, former dean of University of Florida and North Carolina State University

== Art and architecture ==
- Lehman "Monk" Ferris, architect

== Business ==
- David Bohnett (USC): technology entrepreneur; co-founder of GeoCities
- Paul J. Brown (Georgia Tech); CEO of Arby's
- William H. Davidson (Wisconsin, 1924), co-founder and president of Harley-Davidson Motor Company
- Walter G. Ehmer (Georgia Tech): CEO of Waffle House
- Frank Fahrenkopf (Nevada-Reno 1959): president and CEO of the American Gaming Association
- Harold Allen Fernald (University of Maine 1954); Vice President CBS (retired)
- Frank Fertitta III (LSU, 1961): CEO of Station Casinos in Las Vegas, Nevada; owns Ultimate Fighting Championship
- Gerald J. Ford (Southern Methodist): CEO of Golden State Bancorp
- Richard S. Fuld Jr. (Colorado) CEO of Lehman Brothers Holdings
- Richard C. Green (Southern Methodist), CEO of Aquila Corporation
- Matthew J. Hart (Vanderbilt, 1971), former president, COO, and CFO of Hilton Hotels
- James P. Hoffa (Michigan State,1960): president of Teamsters Union; Jimmy Hoffa's son
- Roy M. Huffington (Southern Methodist, 1935), United States Ambassador to Austria
- J. Erik Jonsson (Rensselaer, 1924): founder of Texas Instruments
- Donald Keough (Georgia, 1986), president, chief operating officer, and a director of The Coca-Cola Company
- Julius Curtis Lewis Jr. (University of Georgia): president of J.C. Lewis Enterprises and Lewis Broadcasting Corp.
- Billy Joe "Red" McCombs (University of Texas, 1959): former owner of Minnesota Vikings; namesake of McCombs School of Business
- F. James McDonald (GMI-EMI, 1983), former president, CEO, and COO of General Motors
- Frank Page (UNC at Chapel Hill, 1895): industrialist and banker
- Gregory R. Page (North Dakota, 1973): president and CEO of Cargill, Inc.
- Lewis E. Platt (Cornell 1960): former CEO of Hewlett-Packard
- Bernard Ramsey (University of Georgia): executive with Merrill Lynch and philanthropist
- Joe Rogers Jr. (Georgia Tech, 1965), CEO of Waffle House
- John Schnatter, founder of Papa John's
- Christopher A. Sinclair (University of Kansas): CEO of Mattel
- Elton Bryson Stephens Sr. (Birmingham-Southern): founder of EBSCO Industries
- James E. Thompson (San Jose State, 1959): founder, chairman, and CEO of the Crown Worldwide Group
- Edward Magruder Tutwiler (VMI, 1865): President Tutwiler Coal, Coke & Pig Iron Co., Birmingham, Al.
- John A. Young (Oregon State, 1950): former president and CEO of Hewlett-Packard

== Entertainment ==
- John Besh: celebrity chef
- Roman Bohnen (Minnesota 1920), stage and film actor
- Anthony Michael Brooks (Missouri), world champion Rubik's Cube solver
- Loring Buzzell: music publisher and record label executive
- Bud Collins (Baldwin-Wallace, 1948), tennis announcer and author
- T. S. Cook (Denison, 1969), Oscar and Golden Globe-nominated screenwriter
- Dana Elcar (Michigan, 1949), film and TV actor best known for his supporting role on MacGyver
- Hunter Ellis: reality TV star; host of History Channel's Tactical to Practical
- Rob Estes (Southern California, 1983), an actor known for Melrose Place, Silk Stalkings, and 90210
- Guy Fieri (Nevada-Las Vegas, 1988), Food Network star; host of Guy's Big Bite and Diners, Drive-In's, and Dives
- Brad Fiorenza: MTV's The Real World: San Diego cast member
- Christopher Fitzgerald: Broadway and film actor
- Paul Gilmartin (Indiana, 1982), comedian and television host
- Curt Gowdy (Wyoming, 1939), sports broadcaster
- Bob Guiney (Michigan State, 1990), Bob the Bachelor from The Bachelor 4
- Andrew Haug: radio announcer; drummer for Contrive
- Jack Ingram (Southern Methodist), country music performer
- Keith Jackson (Washington State, 1952), sports broadcaster who won Sports Emmys in 1995 and 1997
- Anthony Jeselnik (Tulane), stand-up comedian, writer, and actor
- Greg Kinnear (Arizona, 1983), Talk Soup host; 1998 Academy Award nominee
- Bert Kreischer (Florida State, 1982), stand-up comedian, actor, and reality television host; known as "The Machine"
- Art Linkletter (San Diego State, 1951), television personality; author, Kids Say The Darndest Things
- Elmer Lower (Missouri) former president of ABC News
- Frank Marshall (UNCA, 1965), film producer and director; co-founder of Amblin Entertainment
- Garry Marshall (Northwestern, 1953), film director and television producer known for Happy Days and Laverne & Shirley
- Forrest Sawyer (Florida, 1968), Emmy-winning newscaster with ABC News and Nightline
- Adam Schroeder: Warner Brothers and FOX New Regency movie producer; Chronicle, The Truman Show, Clueless
- Elliot Segal: radio DJ and host of Elliot in the Morning
- Grant Show (UCLA, 1984), actor known for Melrose Place
- Stryker (DJ): radio DJ and co-host of the radio show Loveline
- Reynolds Wolf: CNN meteorologist

== Law ==
- Stephen H. Grimes (University of Florida): Chief Justice of the Florida Supreme Court
- Procter Ralph Hug Jr. (Nevada-Reno): Judge, Court of Appeals for the Ninth Circuit
- Willis B. Hunt Jr. (Emory University): Chief Justice of the Supreme Court of Georgia
- John Morgan (Florida, 1975), founder of the law firm Morgan & Morgan
- Page Morris, US House of Representatives and Senior Judge of the United States District Court for the District of Minnesota
- Stephen C. O'Connell: Justice and Chief Justice, Florida Supreme Court (1955–1967) and President of the University of Florida (1967–1973)
- Erskine Mayo Ross (VMI 1865): attorney and Judge of the U. S. Circuit Court for California
- James C. Smith (Florida State University) former Florida Attorney General and Florida Secretary of State
- William L. Summers: criminal defense lawyer; past President of the National Association of Criminal Defense Lawyers
- Michael Waddington: court-martial defense lawyer

== Literature and journalism ==
- Shelby Foote: novelist and Civil War historian
- Gene Fowler (Colorado, 1911), author and screenwriter
- Cork Graham: novelist and combat photographer
- Jack McCallum (Muhlenberg ’68), novelist and writer for Sports Illustrated
- Jon Meacham: editor of Newsweek; bestselling author; commentator on politics, history, and religious faith in America
- Tennessee Williams (Missouri, 1930), Pulitzer Prize winner for A Streetcar Named Desire

== Military ==
- Frank Bowman (Duke University): Admiral, USN (retired); former Chief of Naval Personnel and director of Naval Nuclear Propulsion
- George S. Rentz (Gettysburg College): United States Navy Chaplain Corps and commander in the United States Navy
- Holland Smith (Auburn University): General, USMC; the "father" of modern US amphibious warfare
- James Stockdale (Monmouth, 1989) vice admiral and vice-presidential nominee in 1992
- Charles F. Wald (North Dakota State): General, USAF (retired); EUCOM Deputy Commander 2002-2006
- Loren D. Hagen (North Dakota State): First Lieutenant, United States Army; Medal of Honor recipient, August 7, 1971, A Shau Valley, Vietnam

== Politics ==
- Lee Atwater (Newberry, 1970), Chair of the Republican National Committee
- Birch Bayh (Purdue, 1946): US Senate from Indiana
- Richard Bryan (Nevada-Reno, 1956): former US Senator and Nevada Governor
- C. Farris Bryant (University of Florida): Governor of Florida 1961-1965
- George C. Butte: jurist and Texas politician
- Al Cárdenas (Florida Atlantic University) political lobbyist
- Lawton Chiles (University of Florida, 1949) US Senate; Governor of Florida 1991-1998
- Bob Clement (University of Tennessee), US House of Representatives and president of Cumberland University
- Nathan Deal (Mercer University, 1966): Governor of Georgia
- James Eastland (Vanderbilt, 1926), US Senate (1942–1979); Senate Pro Tempore, 1972–1979
- T. Cooper Evans, US House of Representatives
- Frank Fahrenkopf: Chair of the Republican National Committee; president and CEO of the American Gaming Association
- Sam Gibbons: US House of Representatives
- Dwight Griswold (Nebraska, 1913), Governor of Nebraska and U.S. Senate
- Edward Gurney: US Senate, Florida
- Lee H. Hamilton DePauw, 1949), US House of Representatives, Indiana
- Thomas Gordon Hayes (VMI 1866): Maryland Senate, Mayor of Baltimore, and U. S. District Attorney
- Spessard Holland (Emory, 1909): US Senate; Governor of Florida
- Roy M. Huffington (Southern Methodist, 1935), US Ambassador to Austria
- Harry Johnston, US House of Representatives, Florida
- Kurt Kelly (Florida State University): State Representative, dist. 24 Florida
- Jack Kemp (Occidental, 1954), United States Secretary of Housing and Urban Development and professional football player
- Tom Kindness (University of Maryland, College Park): US House of Representatives, Ohio
- Clarence D. Long (Washington & Jefferson,1930), US House of Representatives
- Mike Mansfield (Montana, 1938), US Senate Majority Leader, 1961-1977
- Mel Martínez: US Senate and United States Secretary of Housing and Urban Development
- Larry McDonald: U.S. House of Representatives; killed on Korean Air Flight 007
- Harry Mitchell: US House of Representatives, Arizona
- Page Morris, US House of Representatives and Senior Judge of the United States District Court for the District of Minnesota
- Robert L. Owen (Washington & Lee,1874), US Senate
- John Porter (MIT, 1954), US House of Representatives, Illinois
- William Raggio (Nevada-Reno): Nevada State Senator
- James David Santini (Nevada-Reno): US House of Representatives, State of Nevada; former Nevada district court judge
- Grant Sawyer (Nevada-Reno): Governor of Nevada, 1959-1967
- Alan K. Simpson (Wyoming, 1960), US Senate, Wyoming
- Milward Simpson (Wyoming,1918), Governor of Wyoming and US Senate
- Charles H. Smelser ( University of Maryland, College Park), Maryland State Senator
- James C. Smith (Florida State University), former Florida Attorney General and Florida Secretary of State
- John Wesley Snyder (Vanderbilt, 1915), United States Secretary of the Treasury
- J. Christopher Stevens (UC Berkeley, 1979), former US Ambassador to Libya; killed in the U.S. Consulate attack in Benghazi
- John S. Tanner (University of Tennessee): US House of Representatives from Tennessee
- Bill Torrey (St. Lawrence, 1957), general manager for the Oakland Seals, New York Islanders, and Florida Panthers
- Lindsay C. Warren (UNC, 1907), Comptroller General of the United States and U.S. House of Representatives
- James G. Watt (Wyoming, 1957), U.S. Secretary of the Interior

== Religion ==
- Hazen Graff Werner (Albion College) bishop in the United Methodist Church from 1948 to 1968

== Science ==
- Vannevar Bush: physicist; WWII advisor; architect of modern government science policy
- Sonny Carter (Alpha Theta): NASA astronaut
- Arthur Compton: physicist and Nobel Prize winner
- Charles Duke: NASA astronaut
- Ferid Murad: physician and pharmacologist; Nobel Prize in Physiology or Medicine 1998
- Robet F. Overmyer (Baldwin Wallace University): NASA astronaut
- Edwin Blake Payson: Botanist
- Garrett Reisman (University of Pennsylvania): NASA astronaut
- David Wolf (Purdue University): NASA astronaut

== Sports ==
- John Ayers: NFL football player, 1977–1987
- David Butz (Purdue, 1972) NFL football player, St. Louis Cardinals & Washington Redskins, Super Bowl Champion
- Dom Capers: defensive coordinator, Green Bay Packers; former NFL head coach
- Chris Capuano (Duke), MLB pitcher, Los Angeles Dodgers
- Cris Collinsworth (Florida, 1985), former NFL wide receiver, sports anchor
- Lee Corso (Florida State, 1954), sports commentator, football coach
- Len Dawson (Purdue, 1955), NFL Hall of Famer, Super Bowl IV MVP, sports anchor
- Everett Dean (Indiana, 1918), college basketball and baseball coach
- Paul Dee: former University of Miami athletics director
- Ted DiBiase: "The Million Dollar Man"; former WWF wrestler
- Terry Donahue (San Jose State, 1963), head football coach at the University of California
- Mike Droese: "Duke The Dumpster"; former WWE wrestler
- Terry Funk: pro wrestler
- Joe Girardi: New York Yankees former manager and catcher; former Florida Marlins manager
- Steve Gleason (Washington State, 1996), NFL football player, 2000-2008
- Lucas Glover (Clemson University): PGA Tour golfer; winner of the 2009 US Open
- Lou Groza (Ohio State, 1943), NFL Hall of Famer
- Joe B. Hall (Kentucky, 1948), former head basketball coach of the University of Kentucky Wildcats who were the 1978 National Champions
- Pete Henry (Washington & Jefferson, 1916), football player, coach, and athletic administrator
- Tommy Herr (Delaware, 1974), professional baseball player with the St. Louis Cardinals, Minnesota Twins, Philadelphia Phillies, San Francisco Giants, and New York Mets
- Tony Hulman (Rose-Hulman, 1946), owner of the Indianapolis Motor Speedway
- Bill Ireland (Nevada-Reno): University of Nevada; Las Vegas Baseball Coach 1960–1967; UNLV's first athletic director; the "father of UNLV athletics"
- Keith Jackson (Washington State, 1952), sports commentator, ABC
- Tommy John (Indiana State University, 1954), Major League Baseball pitcher; four-time All-Star team; initiated in 1964
- Ed Jucker: former head coach of the University of Cincinnati Bearcats basketball team; coached the team to two national championships
- Jack Kemp (Occidental, 1954), United States Secretary of Housing and Urban Development and professional football player
- Ernie Koy Jr.: Texas Longhorns, 1963 National Champions; Pro Bowl running back for New York Giants
- Frank Kush (Michigan State, 1951), head football coach at Arizona State University, Hamilton Tiger-Cats, and the Baltimore and Indianapolis Colts
- Magnum T. A.: "Terry Allen"; Former WWF pro wrestler
- John McKay (Oregon, 1948), head football coach at the University of Southern California and the Tampa Bay Buccaneers
- Joel McNulty: All Time Big Ten Conference men's track and field winner; two record-setting and one other win, 1952–1953
- Derek Miles, pole vaulter
- Curt Miller: head coach of the WNBA's Connecticut Sun
- Jim Mora (Occidental, 1955), former head coach of the New Orleans Saints
- Dorian O'Daniel, professional football player
- Victor Oladipo: NCAA 1st Team All-American for the Indiana Hoosiers
- Rob Pannell: all-time NCAA Division 1 men's lacrosse scoring leader at Cornell University
- Roger Reina: former UPenn wrestling coach
- Joe Schoen (DePauw University): NFL general manager (New York Giants, Buffalo Bills), NFL scout (Miami Dolphins, Carolina Panthers)
- Brandon Slay: gold medalist at the Sydney Olympics in wrestling
- Steve Spurrier (Florida, 1966), head coach of the University of South Carolina Gamecocks; Heisman Trophy winner 1966 at University of Florida; former Florida head coach; 1996 National Championship
- Brad Stevens (DePauw University): NBA general manager, head coach (Boston Celtics), NCAA head coach (Butler Bulldogs)
- Jason Szuminski: MLB player (San Diego Padres), 1st major league athlete drafted from MIT
- Robby Thompson: MLB player (San Francisco Giants), MLB coach, manager (San Francisco Giants, Cleveland Indians, Seattle Mariners)
- Tommy Townsend, (Florida, 2016), professional football player
- Jim Tressel: former head coach of the Ohio State Buckeyes who were the2002 National Champions
- Matt Valenti: two-time NCAA national champion wrestler
- Chandler Worthy: WR for the Houston Texans, 2015–present
- Jack Youngblood (Florida, 1971), NFL Hall of Fame

== Fictional members ==
- Bugs Bunny (University of Kentucky, 1947), animated Warner Brothers character; Warner Bros endorses Bugs as an actual member
