= Fowler House (Bastrop, Texas) =

Historic house in Texas, United States

- U.S. National Register of Historic Places
- Recorded Texas Historic Landmark
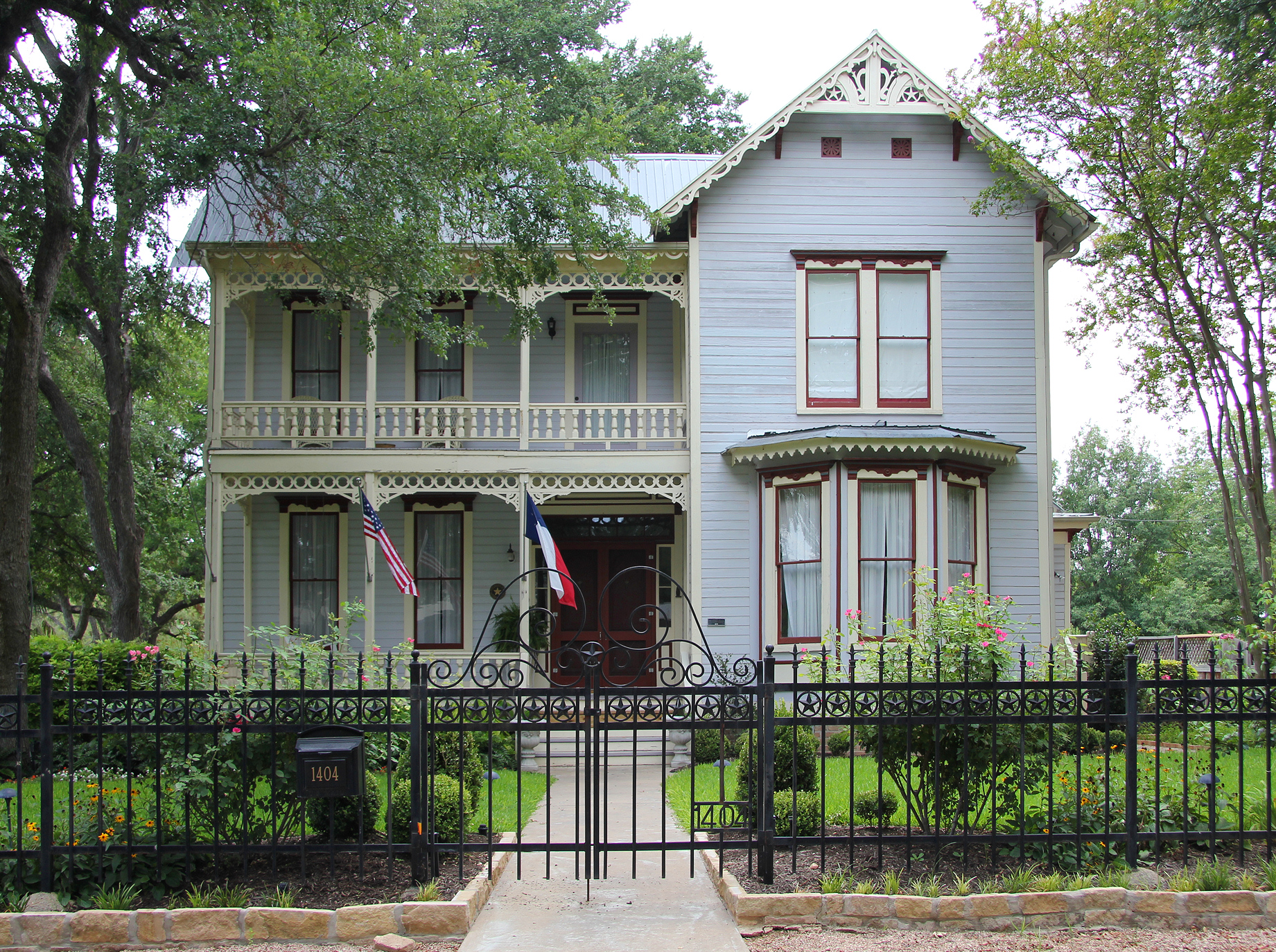
- Fowler House in 2011

- Location within Texas Location within the United States
- Location: 1404 Wilson St., Bastrop, Texas
- Coordinates: 30°6′55″N 97°19′22″W
- Area: less than one acre
- Built: 1852
- Architectural style: Late Victorian
- MPS: Bastrop Historic and Architectural MRA
- NRHP reference No.: 78003321
- RTHL No.: 15623

Significant dates
- Added to NRHP: December 22, 1978
- Designated RTHL: 2008

The Fowler House, also known as the Allen-Fowler House, is a historic, two-story, modified L-plan house built in 1852 in Bastrop, Texas, United States. The house was added to the National Register of Historic Places on December 22, 1978, and was designated a Recorded Texas Historic Landmark in 2008.

The house was built by Professor William J. Hancock of Aberdeen, Mississippi, in 1852 after he arrived in Bastrop to become headmaster at the Bastrop Academy, one of the leading schools in Texas at the time. The house was not only for his family and him, but also for student boarders.

In 1857, Bastrop Academy became Bastrop Military Institute, which trained young men for service during the Civil War. Colonel Robert Thomas Pritchard Allen replaced Hancock as headmaster and Allen and his wife Julia moved into the house. They continued to board cadets who attended the institute. Sam Houston, a hero of the Texas Revolution, was a frequent guest of the Allens while his sons attended the institute.

John Preston Fowler and Maud Maynard Fowler bought the property in 1876 and added Victorian detailing and a projecting bay window to the structure. Fowler became mayor of Bastrop, county attorney, and a Texas state senator.

The current owner of the house is Geoff Connor, who purchased the house in 2006.

== See also ==
- National Register of Historic Places listings in Bastrop County, Texas
- Recorded Texas Historic Landmarks in Bastrop County
