= Bastrop Academy =

Military school in Texas, US

Coordinates: 30.115°N 97.322°W

Bastrop Academy, 1887 "Diagonal Street" is now Church Street Allen-Fowler House in foreground.

Bastrop Academy, later renamed Bastrop Military Institute, was located in Bastrop, Texas. The institute was moved to Austin in 1870 and renamed to Texas Military Institute.

== Bastrop Academy ==
In 1851, the citizens of Bastrop, in the form of the Bastrop Educational Society, founded the Bastrop Academy, and the school received its charter on January 24, 1852. Professor William J. Hancock of Aberdeen, Mississippi became the first headmaster at the academy, and the Bastrop Female Academy was incorporated. On arrival, Hancock built what is now referred to as the Allen-Fowler House at 1404 Wilson Street, not only for him and his family, but also for student boarders.

Bastrop Academy was rechartered on February 7, 1853, under the jurisdiction of the Methodist Episcopal Church, South. Administrators built a two-story pine building for $15,000; it had separate male and female study halls and a library of 1,000 volumes. The enrollment was 132 for the first session and increased to 194 by 1857. The academy became one of the leading schools in Texas.

== Bastrop Military Institute ==
In 1857, the male part of Bastrop Academy became Bastrop Military Institute, which trained young men for service during the Civil War. Colonel Robert Thomas Pritchard Allen replaced Hancock as headmaster and Allen and his wife Julia purchased Fowler House. They continued to board cadets that attended the institute.

During the American Civil War, enrollment at the Bastrop Military Institute a significant decline. Initially, the institute's campus comprised only barracks and recitation halls, proving inadequate for its intended expansion as Texas's primary institution for general and applied sciences. The institute resumed operations in September 1867, albeit with markedly reduced student numbers.

In 1867 John Garland James and his family moved to Bastrop, Texas, where James was president of the Institute in 1868. He was superintendent, business manager, and professor of philosophy and mathematics; his father and brothers, Charles and Fleming Wills James, assisted him in the enterprise. Additionally, James was joined by Hardaway Hunt Dinwiddie in 1868, a fellow alumnus of the Virginia Military Institute (VMI) and a fellow member of the Alpha Tau Omega fraternity.

== Texas Military Institute ==
In the winter of 1869/1870, James and the institute's leadership resolved to relocate the school to Austin, a decision influenced by Austin's recent accumulation of a $10,000 building fund in gold. Subsequently, a 32-acre site was acquired in March 1870. On June 10, 1870, the relocated Texas Military Institute officially commenced operations in its new Austin location.

By 1872, the value of the institute's physical facilities had reached $50,000, including a cadet barracks capable of housing 400 students. The institute's disciplinary approach was inspired by the United States Military Academy at West Point and James' alma mater Virginia Military Institute, encompassing both scientific and literary education. The military component was primarily aimed at physical exercise rather than professional soldier training. Residency in the barracks was mandatory for all cadets. In 1873, the student population stood at 150. The average cost for tuition, board, and other fees amounted to $375 per academic year. The college, while nonsectarian, maintained a religious ethos and operated successfully until 1879. In that year, President John Garland James and the faculty left to join the staff of Texas A&M University.

== Reuse of Bastrop Academy real estate ==
After the Institute moved to Austin, on May 25, 1872, the City of Bastrop purchased the property of the academy and it became a part of the Bastrop public school system. The city used the buildings for a variety of schools, until a public school system was established in 1892.

In 1876, the headmaster's residence and boarding house was sold to John Preston Fowler and Maud Maynard Fowler. They added Victorian detailing and a projecting bay window to the structure. Fowler became mayor of Bastrop, county attorney and a Texas state senator.

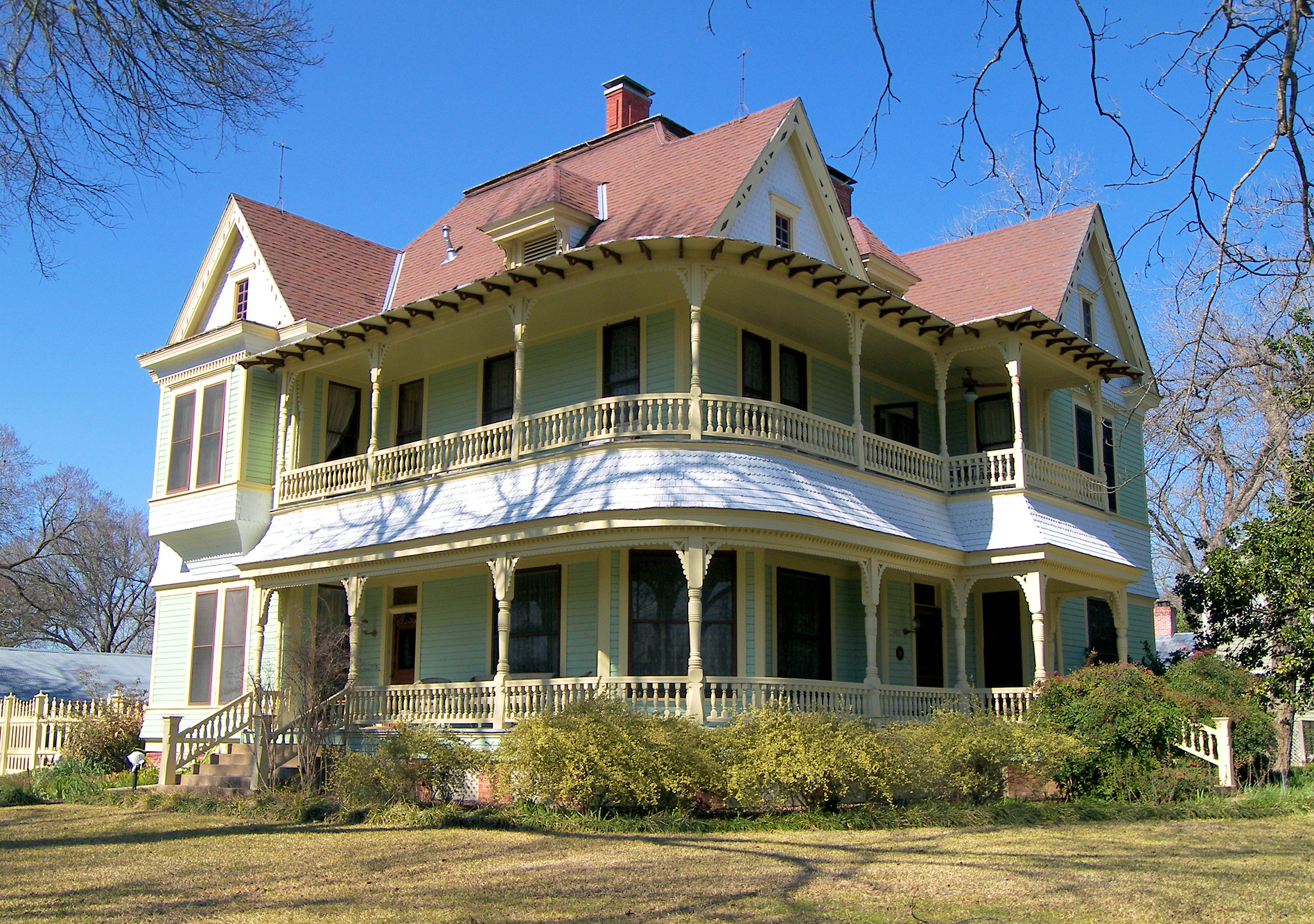
The H. P. Luckett House occupies the former site of the academy.

In 1892, the city sold the academy property at 1402 Church Street to Dr. H.P. Luckett, a prominent citizen who had practiced medicine in the town for almost 50 years. Luckett demolished the existing structures, and built the H. P. Luckett House on the site.
