= Thomas Dudley Wooten =

American surgeon and Confederate veteran (1829–1906)

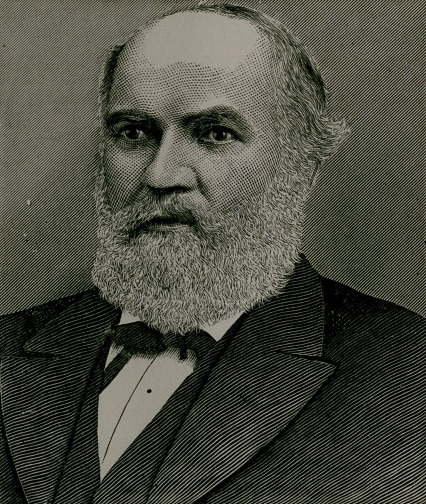
- Born: March 6, 1829; Barren County, Kentucky, US
- Died: August 1, 1906 (aged 77); Eureka Springs, Arkansas, US
- Military career
- Allegiance: Confederate States
- Branch: Missouri State Guard; Confederate States Army
- Battles: American Civil War; Battle of Wilson's Creek; Battle of Pea Ridge
- Other work: Physician

Thomas Dudley Wooten (1829–1906) was an American physician, and a Confederate soldier and army surgeon during the American Civil War.

== Early life ==
Thomas Dudley Wooten was born in Barren County, Kentucky, on March 6, 1829. His parents were Virginians. He graduated from the medical department of the University of Louisville in 1853, and settled in Springfield, Missouri, in 1856.

== Civil War ==
At the outbreak of the Civil War he enlisted as a private, but later was made surgeon of Foster's regiment of the Missouri State Troops. In August, 1861, he was appointed chief surgeon of McBride's 7th Division, and a little later surgeon-general of all the Missouri forces. Afterwards he was made medical director of the First Army Corps of the West, commanded by General Sterling Price.

== Later life ==
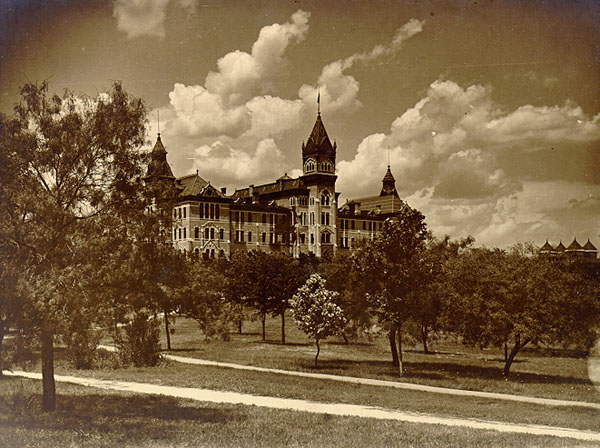
The Old Main Building at the University of Texas, 1903

In 1865 he practised in Paris, Texas, and in 1876 moved to Austin, in both places achieving considerable reputation as a surgeon. Upon the inauguration of the University of Texas, in 1881, Wooten was appointed one of the regents; in 1886, on the death of Ashbel Smith, he became president of the board. He was a prominent member of the county and state medical societies.

Wooten died at Eureka Springs, Arkansas, on August 1, 1906, of acute gastro-enterocolitis, after an illness of four days. He was buried at Oakwood Cemetery in Austin.

== Personal life ==
He married, in 1853, Henrietta, daughter of Turner Goodall, a physician of Tompkinsville, Kentucky, and had four children. Two of his sons, Goodall and Joseph S., became physicians.

== See also ==
- Medicine in the American Civil War

== Sources ==
- Campbell, Randolph B. "Mike"; Derbes, Brett J. (1952; rev. 2019). "Wooten, Thomas Dudley (1829–1906)". Handbook of Texas (online ed.). Texas State Historical Association. Retrieved May 24, 2023.

Attribution:

- Decherd, George Michael (1920). "Wooten, Thomas Dudley". Kelly, Howard A.; Burrage, Walter L. (eds.). American Medical Biographies. Baltimore, MD: The Norman, Remington Company. p. 1265.
