= Hardaway Hunt Dinwiddie =

4th President of Texas A&M

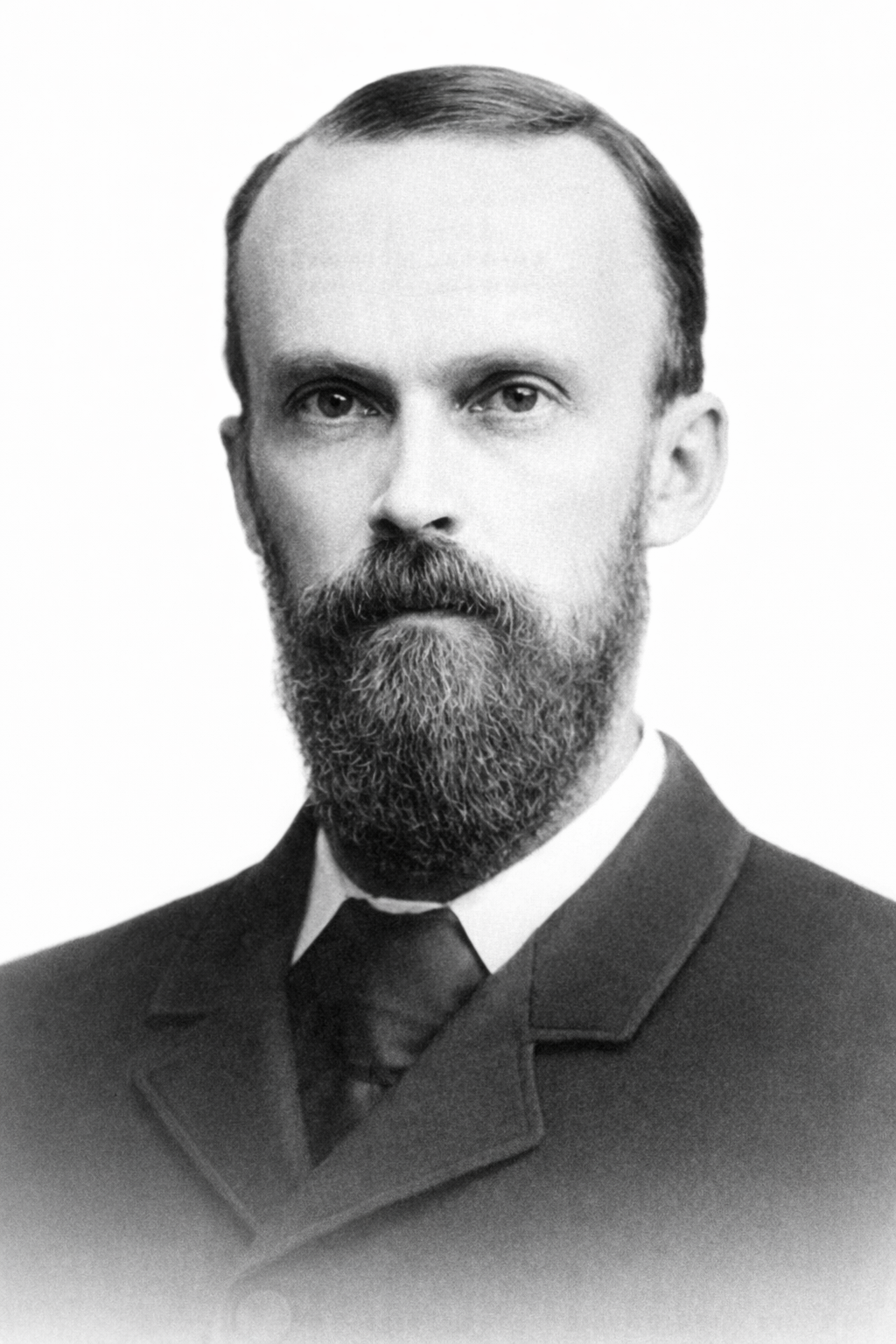
- H. H. Dinwiddie, Texas A&M
- Born: Hardaway Hunt Dinwiddie; October 25, 1844; Lynchburg, Virginia, US
- Died: December 11, 1887; College Station, Texas, US
- Occupation: 4th President of Texas A&M University
- Years active: 1883-1887
- Known for: 2nd initiate of Alpha Tau Omega fraternity
- Spouse: Fannie Evans
- Children: 1

Hardaway Hunt Dinwiddie (born October 25, 1844, in Lynchburg, Virginia) was an educator and a notable figure in the development of Texas higher education. He served as the 4th president of Texas A&M College (Texas A&M University). He graduated from Virginia Military Institute in 1868. In 1865 while at VMI, he was the second initiate and a charter member of the Alpha chapter of the Alpha Tau Omega fraternity.

== Early life ==
Dinwiddie was born on October 25, 1844, in Lynchburg, Virginia to Mary Ann Turner Dinwiddie and James A. Dinwiddie. His mother died in October 1847 when he was 3 years old. His father remarried in 1850 to Sarah Adeline Holland Dinwiddie when Hardaway was 7 years of age. His father and step-mother had 7 more children, bringing the family total to 8.

His father, James Dinwiddie, was a jeweler in Lynchburg until after the Civil War. James was refused for active service on account of health and served in the home guard in Lynchburg. After the Civil War James and Sarah Dinwiddie moved to the Holland family farm.

== Education ==
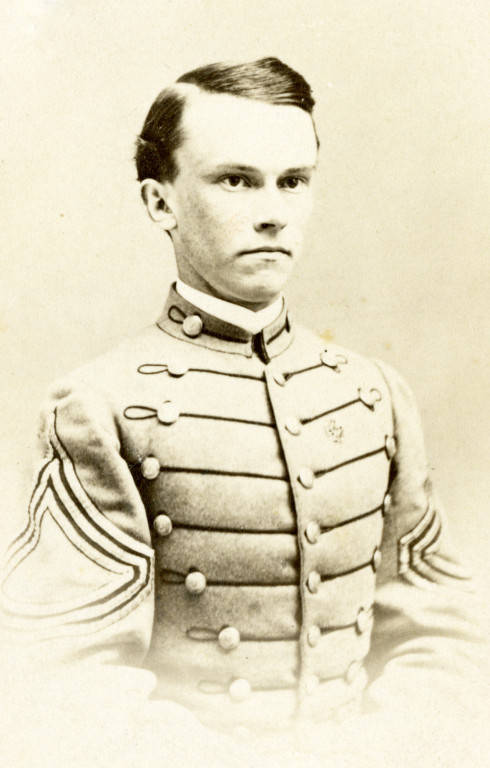
Dinwiddie at VMI, ca. 1867 Wearing ΑΤΩ Badge

=== Virginia Military Institute ===
He entered the Virginia Military Institute (VMI) on Sept. 6, 1862. and was the valedictorian of the class of 1867. From 1867 to 1868 he held the position of Cadet Adjunct. Many of the VMI cadets participated in the Battle of New Market. Dinwiddie served as a Corporal in Company C during the battle. He also served with the Corps of Cadets in the Richmond trenches during the Fall of 1864 until it disbanded on April 2, 1865.

=== Alpha Tau Omega ===
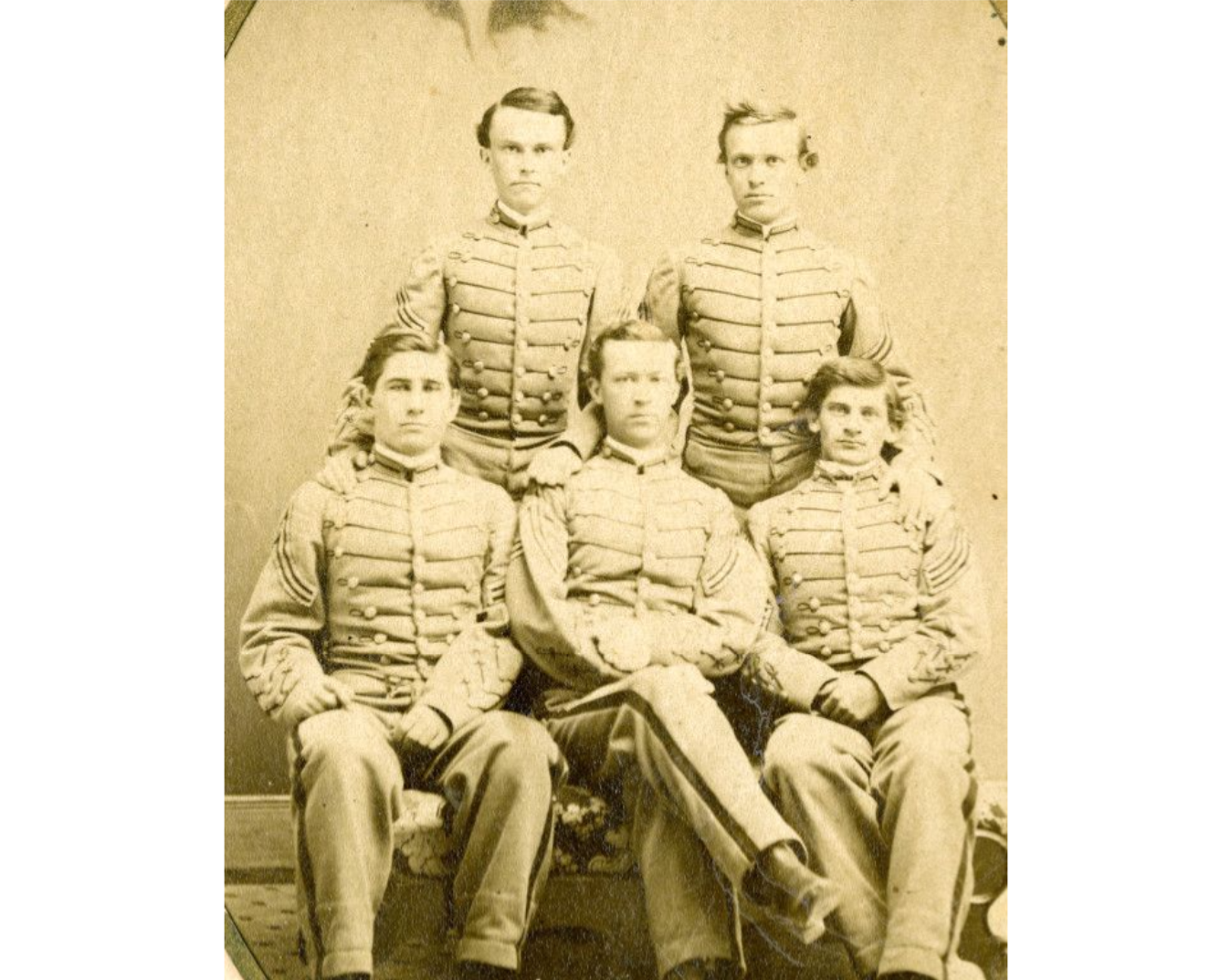
Dinwiddie, Hayes & Tutwiler ATO charter members Back: Dinwiddie, Gaylord B. Clark. Front: Ed M. Tutwiler, John L. Tunstall, Thomas G. Hayes.

On September 11, 1865 after the conclusion of the Civil War, Alpha Tau Omega was founded by the three founders, Otis Alan Glazebrook, Alfred Marshall and Erskin Mayo Ross. In the Fall of that same year, the returning cadets were temporarily lodged in private residences and the hotels of Lexington, Virginia. Alfred Marshall and Dinwiddie who had roomed together prior to the war shared a room at the Lexington Hotel. On the evening of October 18, 1865, Dinwiddie was initiated by Glazebrook and Marshall at the Lexington Hotel. This made him the second initiate of the Alpha Tau Omega and a charter member of the Alpha chapter of ΑΤΩ. Close inspection of his picture in his cadet uniform reveals that he is wearing his ΑΤΩ badge on his chest.

Dinwiddie continued his involvement with the fraternity after graduating from VMI. He was an associate editor of Alpha Tau Omega's journal the Palm and wrote many articles for the publication. Of him, former national ΑΤΩ president Joseph R. Anderson said, "During the years he was the head of the great institution in Texas he was recognized far and near as a Christian scholar as well as a wise administrator and a most useful citizen. There never lived a purer, lovelier, nobler manlier spirit."

His commitment to the fraternity's ideals is commemorated by the ΑΤΩ Badge on his headstone which was a request on his deathbed.

== Career ==
=== Texas Military Institute ===
Dinwiddie moved to Bastrop, Texas in 1868, where he joined fellow ΑΤΩ and VMI graduate John Garland James at the Bastrop Military Institute where he served as a professor of physics and chemistry. After the Civil War, attendance at the school had become very low. During the winter of 1869–70 the leaders of the institute decided to move the school to Austin and renamed it to the Texas Military Institute. Dinwiddie moved to Austin with the school's relocation.

=== Texas A&M College ===
In 1879, Dinwiddie moved from Austin to the countryside outside of Bryan, Texas to join the staff of Texas A&M College. Once again, he joined his friend and fraternity brother, John Garland James who was serving as the college's 2nd president of Texas A&M. In 1883, John Garland James stepped down from his duties as the president of A&M and was succeeded by James Reid Cole. Cole served as president for a month before abolished the position of president, and appointing Dinwiddie at the Chairman of the Faculty, the successor to the role with a similar capacity. Dinwiddie is today recognized as the 4th President of Texas A&M University.

Dinwiddie's tenure at Texas A&M was marked by his defense of the institution's autonomy, mainly from the University of Texas. He has been credited with helping maintain the University's independence in the mid-1880s against the University of Texas and the Texas Legislature. In a series of letters published in the Texas Review in April and March 1886, Dinwiddie argued with Leslie Waggener, the 1st President of the University of Texas, over the funding and control of Texas A&M. These debates, documented in the Austin American-Statesman, played a role in securing the institution's autonomy.

During his administration, Dinwiddie was involved in the establishment and expansion of the college across the state. He placed recruitment notices on newspaper across the state to boost enrollment. Dinwiddie lobbied for a railroad depot to be establish at the college. The station was built and was given the name College Station. This simple move made the university far more accessible and helped to alleviate the isolation felt by the students.

== Death and commemoration ==
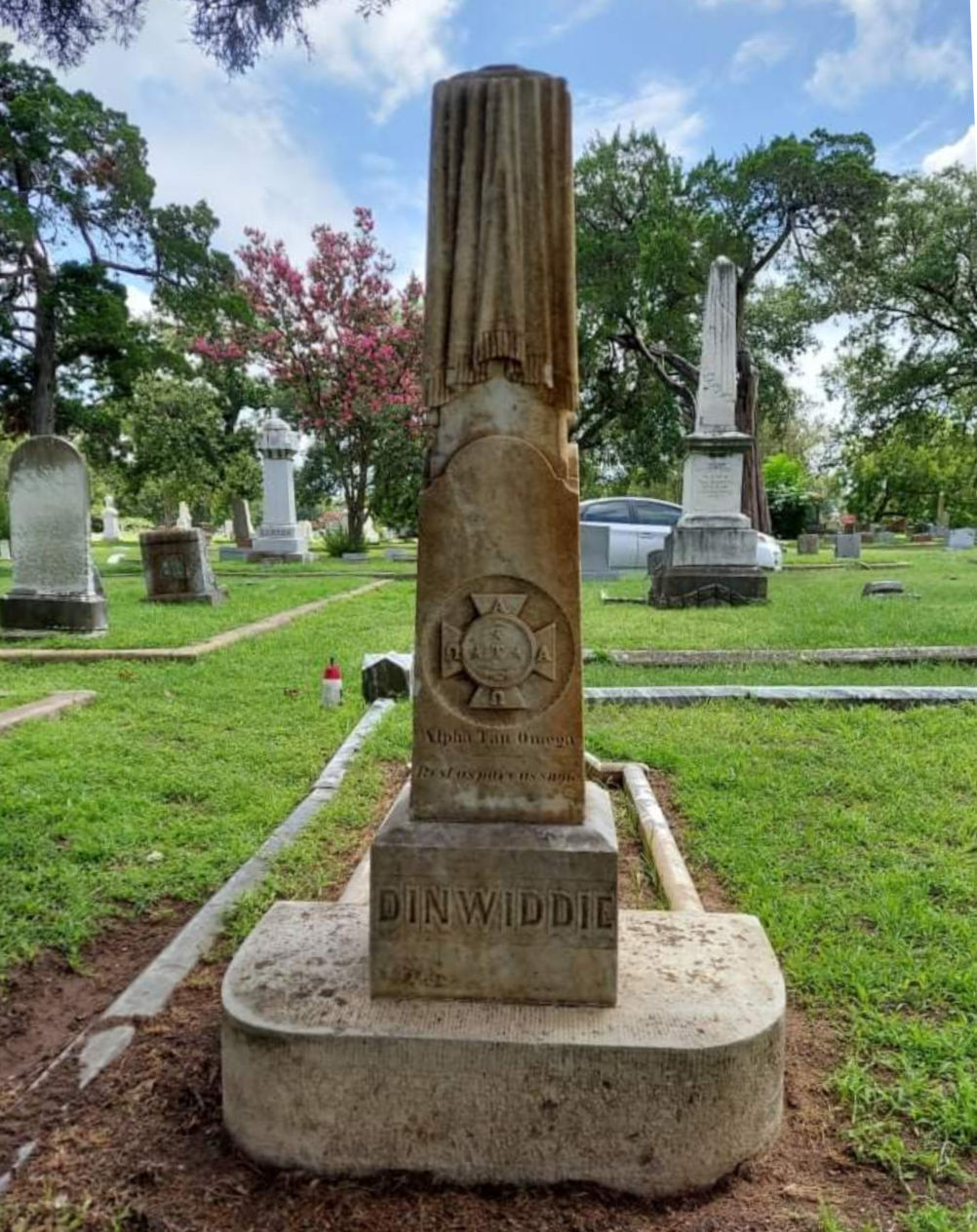
Grave of Hardaway Hunt Dinwiddie, Oakland Cemetery (Section 1, Lot 67)

Dinwiddie died on December 11, 1887, in Austin, Texas, and was buried in Oakwood Cemetery (Section 1, Lot 67). According to an article in the Austin American-Statesman, Dinwiddie died of pneumonia which was "contracted during the summer among the mountains in Colorado". His gravestone displays an ΑΤΩ Badge, which he requested while on his deathbed.

=== Faculty resolutions of respect ===
A resolution was published in the Austin American-Statesman by Louis L. McInnis, Dinwiddie's successor. Professors Bringhurst, Wipprecht and Curtis were appointed a committee to draft the memorial. The published resolution made the following statements.

The college is his monument. He needs no other.

That, in his death, the college has suffered an irreparable loss, and the state a deplorable calamity because he devoted every energy of his heroic nature to the task of establishing this institution upon a foundation of enduring prosperity, and because he was the advocate and the champion of educational progress. That the cause of education has lost a shining light, and we, a leader, associate, and friend, whose image will abide in our hearts always; whose example will inspire and encourage us, and be treasured by our successors for all time to come.

=== Corps of Cadets resolutions of respect ===
The Texas A&M Corps of Cadets also published resolutions of respect to the Austin American-Statesman. A committee of 9 cadets, chaired by Mark Swain, drafted the resolutions. The cadets wore mourning attire for thirty days in Dinwiddie's honor after his death and also submitted the following statement:

That in the death of Major H. H. Dinwiddie this college loses an earnest worker, who was always active and zealous in the performance of his duties; ever ready to advance the interest of this institution; devoted to its welfare and prosperity; one who was wise in counsel and fearless in action, an honest and upright man, whose virtues endeared him not only to his students, but to all his fellow citizens.

=== Assembly Hall commemoration ===
In 1889, two years after Dinwiddie's death, the construction of the Assembly Hall began on the A&M campus. In tribute to Dinwiddie, a large marble tablet commemorating him was installed in the wall of the building directly behind the pulpit. The tablet served as a reminder of his contributions and the esteem in which he was held by the Texas A&M community. As reported in 1915 by The Battalion, the A&M newspaper, the tablet underscored Dinwiddie's importance to the university:

We infer that he was a much loved man because we find a large marble tablet in his honor embedded in the wall of the chapel back of the rostrum.

The Assembly Hall was demolished in 1929. The whereabouts of the tablet, if it still exists, is unknown.

=== 1900 commencement address ===
A final commemoration of Dinwiddie occurred during the commencement address to the Texas A&M graduating class of 1900. The address was given by John Newton Davis. Davis graduated from Texas A&M in 1885 during the Dinwiddie administration. During his address to the graduates, Davis made the following statement.

No longer does the quiet, dignified form of a Dinwiddie grace the president's chair or mansion, but he lives in the heart of every co-laborer who survives him, in the heart and life of every student who knew him, in every hand that that received his kindly grasp – yea, he lives in the dignity and classic stability he gave to our college. And as long as the A. and M. shall live and her alumni breathe the free air of Texas, the name H. H. Dinwiddie will live and inspire them to higher and nobler deeds... A Dinwiddie to establish and dignify the institution — a Ross to uphold and popularize it — and a Foster to expand it into the saving hope and glory of the Empire State of Texas.

== Images ==
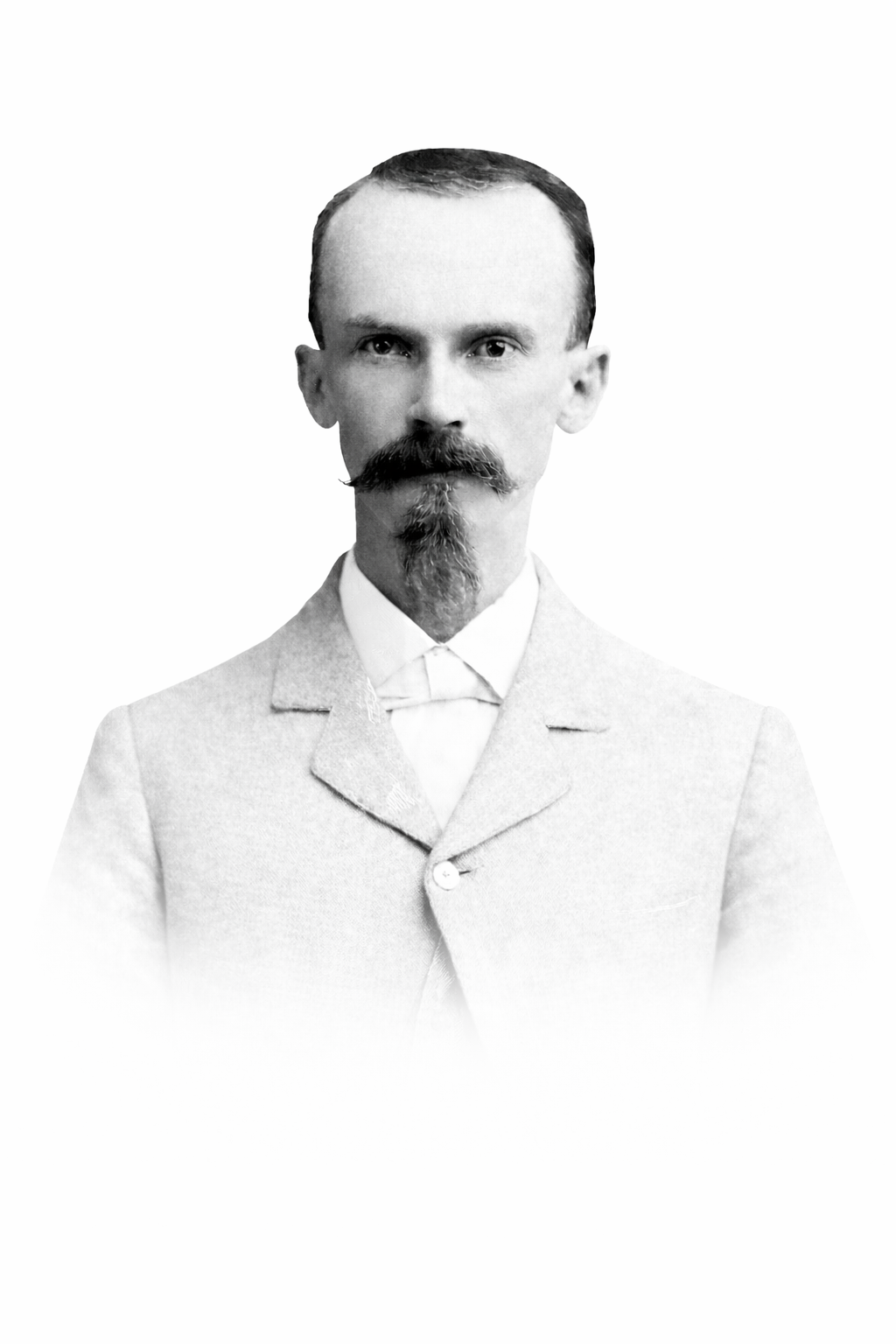
Dinwiddie, ca. 1885

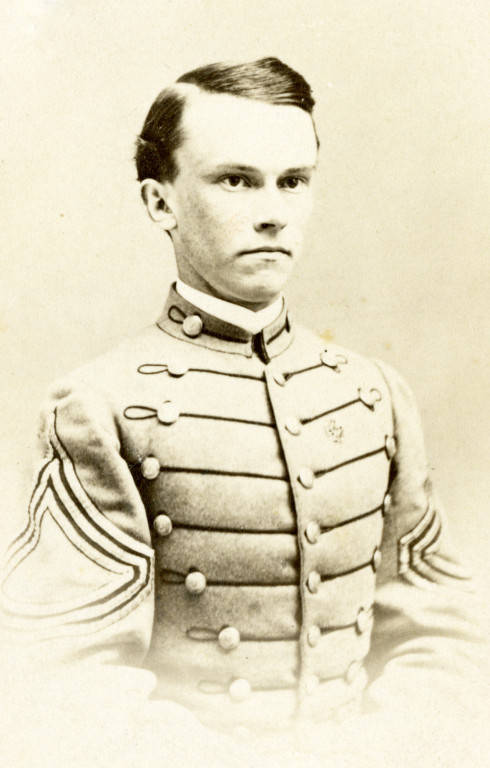
Dinwiddie at VMI, ca. 1867

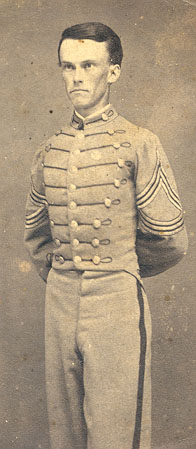
Dinwiddie at VMI, ca. 1866

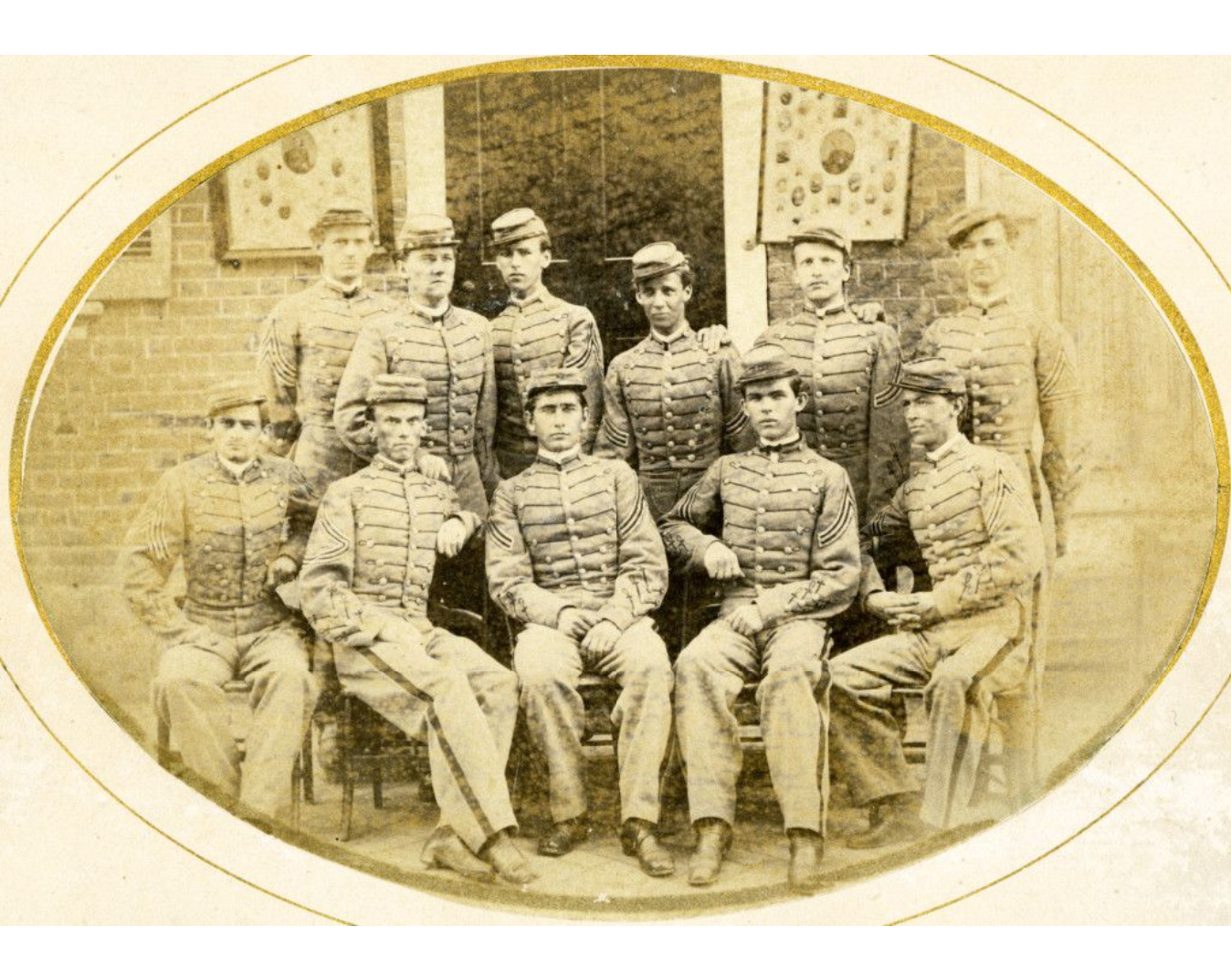
Group of eleven cadets, all veterans of the Battle of New Market. These are probably the 11 graduates of the Class of 1867. Sepia, oval mounted on mat. Subjects include Nicholas J. Bayard; Hardaway H. Dinwiddie; Hugh W. Fry; Edward Magruder Tutwiler; Thomas Gordon Hayes; Patrick Henry; John L. Tunstall; John S. Webb., ca. 1867.

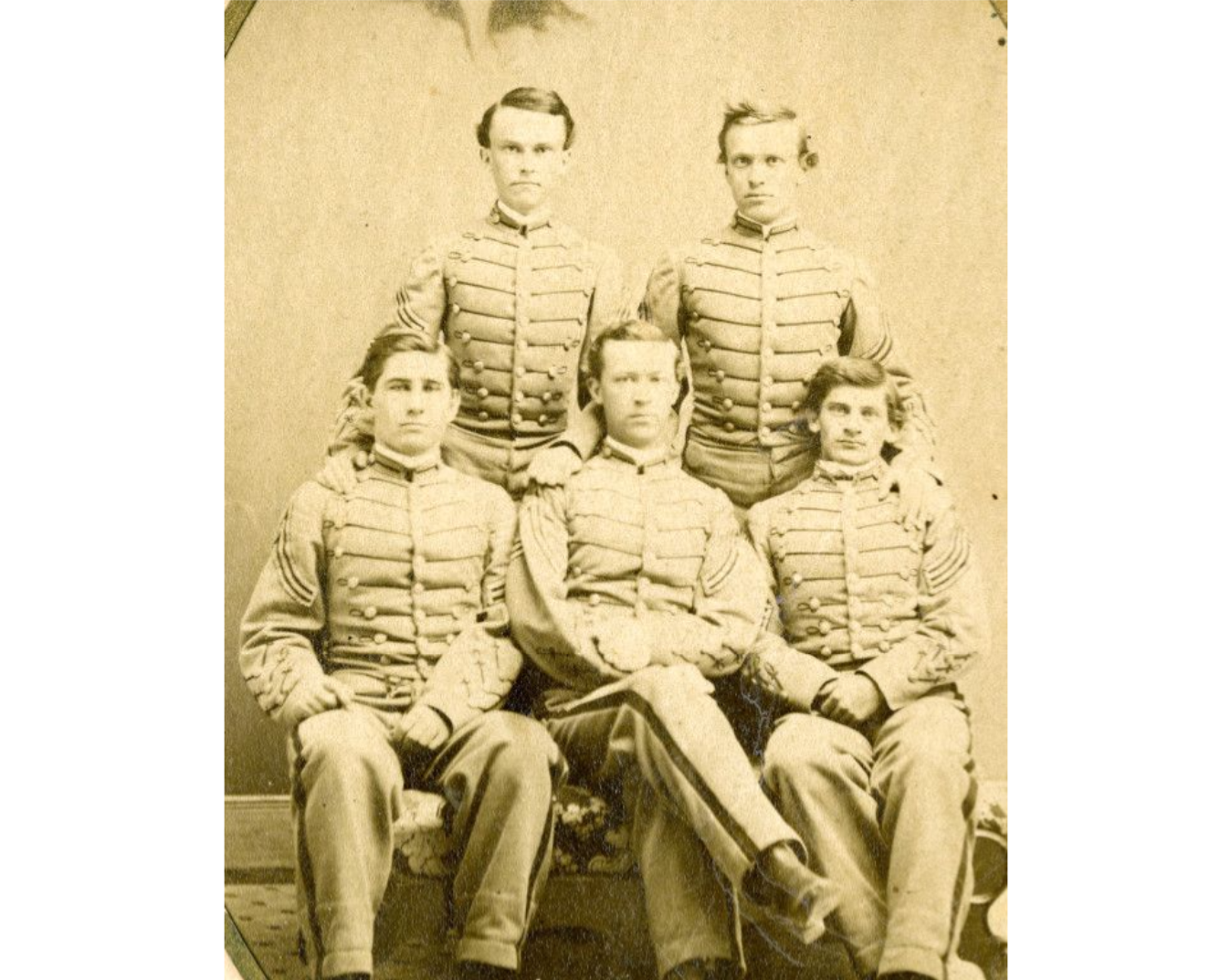
Class of 1867 Officers
Back: Hardaway H. Dinwiddie, Gaylord B. Clark.
Front: Edward Magruder Tutwiler, John L. Tunstall, Thomas Gordon Hayes.
All five were veterans of the Battle of New Market., ca. 1867. Hayes & Tutwiler were also Alpha chapter charter members of ΑΤΩ
