= Oakwood Cemetery (Austin, Texas) =

Cemetery in Texas, US

- City Cemetery
- U.S. National Register of Historic Places
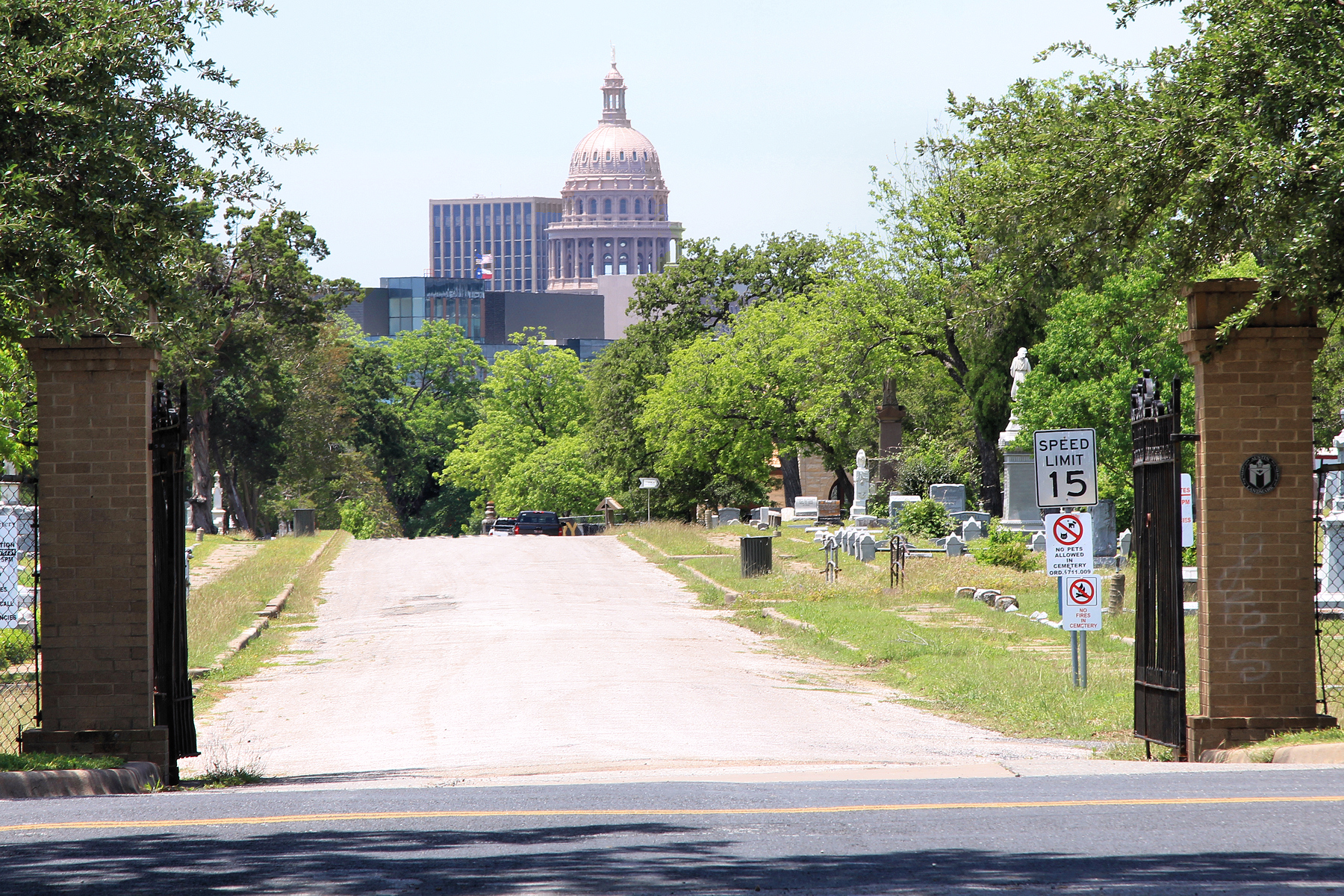
- The entrance to the cemetery off Comal Street
- Location: 16th & Navasota; Austin, Texas, US
- Coordinates: 30°16′36″N 97°43′35″W
- MPS: East Austin MRA
- NRHP reference No.: 85002297
- Added to NRHP: September 17, 1985

Oakwood Cemetery, originally called City Cemetery, is the oldest city-owned cemetery in Austin, Texas. Situated on a hill just east of I-35 that overlooks downtown Austin, just north of the Swedish Hill Historic District and south of Disch-Falk Field, the once-isolated site is now in the center of the city.

== History ==
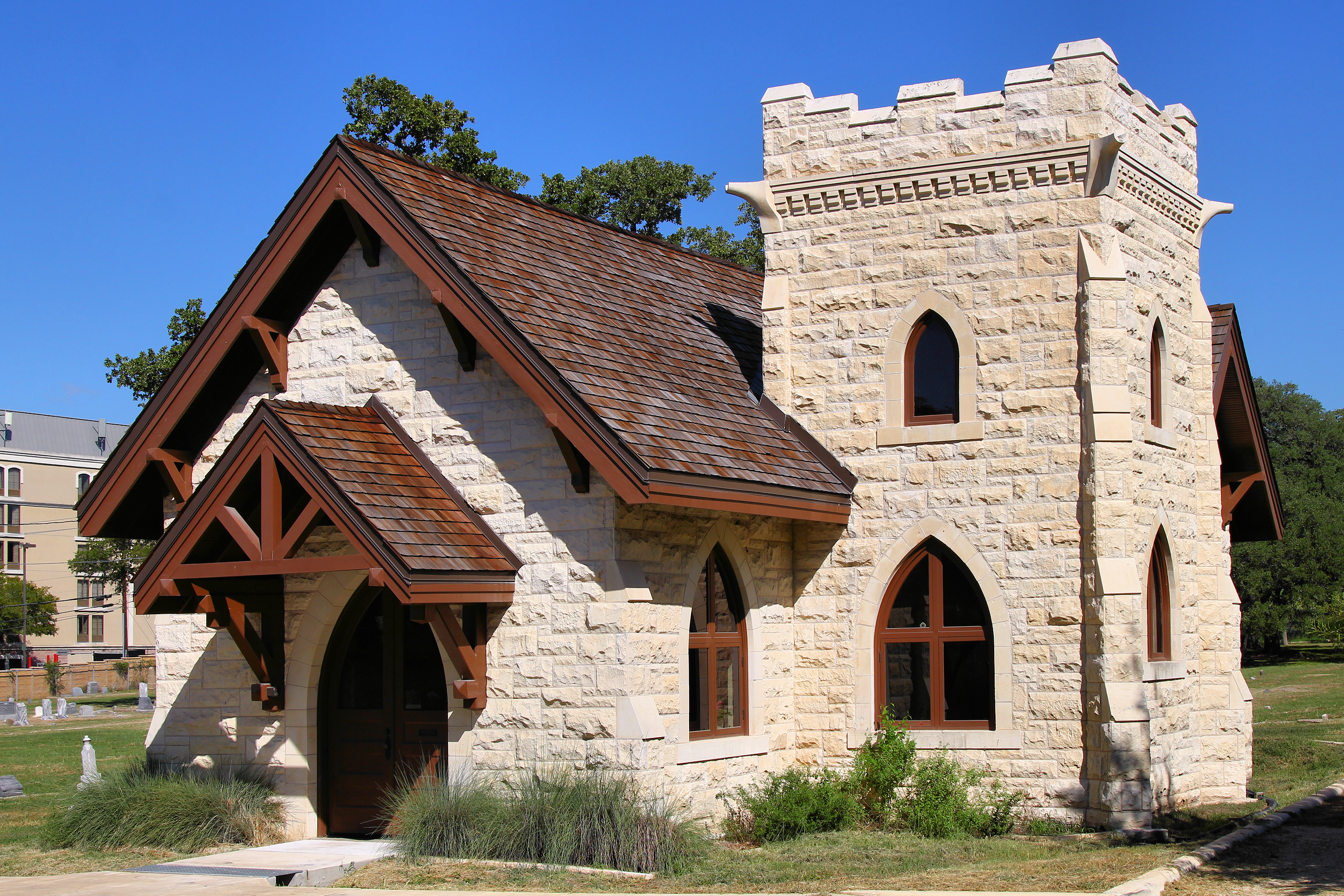
The Oakwood Cemetery Chapel

The cemetery was established in 1839. Its oldest currently-standing monument commemorates two victims of a Comanche attack who perished in 1842.

The cemetery was renamed Oakwood in 1907 per city ordinance. It spreads over 40 acres (160,000 m^{2}), including an annex across Comal Street to the east established in 1914, and includes sections historically dedicated to the city's black, Latino, and Jewish populations. Paupers were historically buried in unmarked graves on the cemetery's south side. Graves without permanent markers were subject to reburial after a given period.

In 1914, the Oakwood Cemetery Mortuary Chapel was built on a design by Texas architect Charles Henry Page as a site for memorial services. The chapel was later renovated and remodeled in 1944 under the direction of local architect J. Roy White.

The cemetery became a Recorded Texas Historic Landmark in 1972 and was added to the National Register of Historic Places in 1985; its annex was added on October 30, 2003. The view of the Texas State Capitol from Comal Street in the center of the cemetery became one of the Capitol View Corridors protected under state and local law from obstruction by tall buildings in 1983. Despite its protected status, the cemetery had been subject to crime, vandalism, and decay for decades until significant restoration efforts began in the mid 2010s.

== Notable burials ==
- Wilmer Allison (1904–1977), tennis player
- L. C. Anderson (1853–1938), academic administrator
- John Andrewartha (1839–1916), architect and civil engineer
- Jessie Andrews (1867–1919), first woman graduate from the University of Texas at Austin
- Richard Bache Jr. (1784–1848), politician and military officer
- Anne L. Armstrong (1927–2008), diplomat and politician
- John Barclay Armstrong (1850–1913), Texas Ranger and Marshal
- Richard Bache Jr. (1784–1848), politician
- Jacob Bickler (1849–1902), scholar and educator
- Annie Webb Blanton (1870–1945), politician
- Albert S. Burleson (1863–1937), politician
- Florence Anderson Clark (1835–1918), author, librarian, and academic administrator
- Dabney Coleman (1932–2024), actor
- Oscar Branch Colquitt (1861–1940), politician
- Abner Cook (1814–1884), architect
- Susanna Dickinson (1814–1883), Alamo survivor
- Hardaway Hunt Dinwiddie (1844–1887), academic administrator
- John Crittenden Duval (1816–1897), author
- John Henry Faulk (1913–1990), radio personality
- Rebecca Jane G. Fisher (1831–1926), philanthropist and preservationist
- George Pierce Garrison (1853–1910), historian
- George Washington Glasscock (1810–1868), politician
- James M. Goggin (1820–1899), military officer
- Robert E. Grant (1825–1888), politician
- Thomas Green (1814–1864), military officer
- Thomas Watt Gregory (1861–1933), politician
- Andrew Jackson Hamilton (1815–1875), politician
- Morgan C. Hamilton (1809–1893), politician
- John Hancock (1824–1893), politician
- Ima Hogg (1882–1975), philanthropist
- James S. Hogg (1851–1906), politician
- Will Hogg (1875–1930), attorney and real estate developer
- William H. Holland (1841–1907), politician
- William Henry Huddle (1847–1892), painter
- John Garland James (1844–1930), academic administrator
- Edward R. Kone (1848–1933), politician
- Jacob Kuechler (1823–1893), politician
- George W. Littlefield (1842–1920), businessman and military officer
- Alan Lomax (1915–2002), ethnomusicologist
- John Lomax (1867–1948), musicologist
- Reuben Shannon Lovinggood (1864–1916), academic administrator
- Hermann Lungkwitz (1813–1891), painter and photographer
- Henry Green Madison (1843–1912), politician
- Bud McCallum (1900–1977), American football player and coach
- Jane Y. McCallum (1877–1957), politician and author
- Thomas F. McKinney (1801–1873), businessman and politician
- John Marks Moore (1853–1902), attorney politician
- Nimrod Lindsay Norton (1830–1903), politician and military officer
- William J. Oliphant (1845–1930), photographer
- Charles Henry Page (1876–1957), architect
- Elisha M. Pease (1812–1883), politician
- Gene Ramey (1913–1984), jazz musician
- Oran Milo Roberts (1815–1898), politician
- Felix Huston Robertson (1839–1928), military officer
- James T. Robison (1861–1929), politician
- William A. Saylor (1843–1887), politician, lawyer, military officer
- Monroe M. Shipe (1847–1924), real estate developer
- Jack Straus (1930–1988), poker player
- John J. Terrell (1857–1920), politician
- Ben Thompson (1842–1884), lawman
- Benedette Moore Tobin (1849–1901), clubwoman and socialite
- William M. Walton (1832–1915), politician
- Charles S. West (1829–1885), judge
- Martha E. Whitten (1942–1917), poet
- Thomas Dudley Wooten (1829–1906), military officer
- Andrew Jackson Zilker (1858–1934), businessman and philanthropist
