= Rosewood Park (Austin, Texas) =

Park in Austin, Texas, United States

Rosewood Neighborhood Park
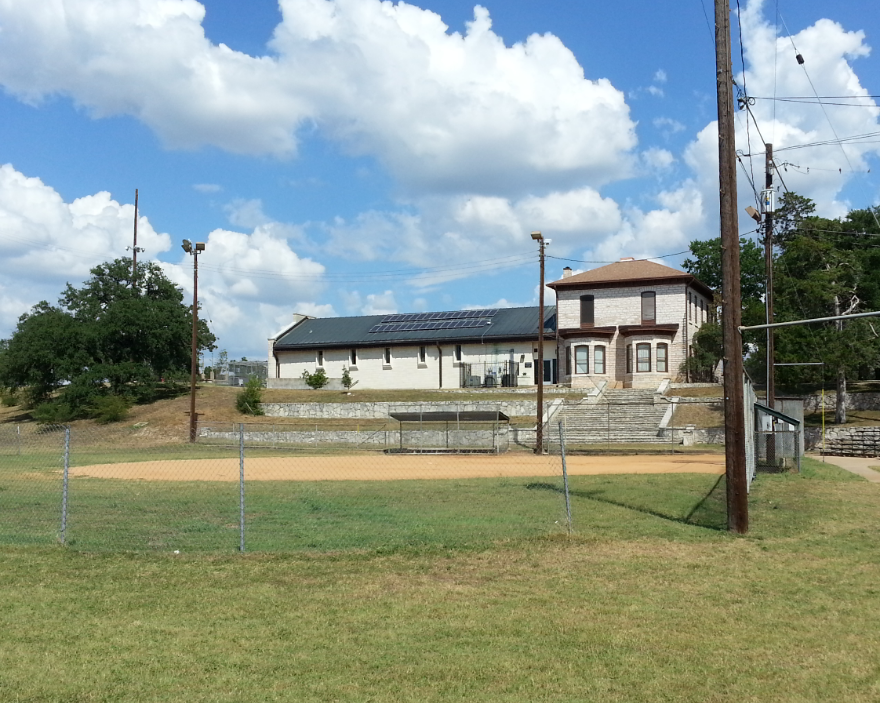
- Rosewood Park baseball field and Rec Center
- Location: 2300 Rosewood Ave. Austin, Texas, United States
- Coordinates: 30°16′20″N 97°42′51″W
- Created: 1929

Rosewood Neighborhood Park is a public park in East Austin, Texas. The park features tennis courts, playscapes, swimming pool, splash pad, as well as the Delores Duffie Recreation Center and the Doris "Dorie" Miller Auditorium. Combined, they comprise a 31,500 square feet facility with a gymnasium. They offer year round classes, workshops, special events, tournaments, performances, and demonstrations.

== History ==
The 17-acre (6.9 ha) property in East Austin was originally the home site of Rudolph Bertram, a local store owner and namesake for the town of Bertram. In 1875, Bertram built the 14-room limestone block house on the property, which now functions as the Recreation Center. The house passed to his daughter Emmie and her husband, Charles Huppertz. After their deaths, the city of Austin purchased the Bertram-Huppertz house and land in 1928 to create a segregated park for the African-American community. In 1929, a playground and after-school program was established at the site. Throughout the 1930s, the city added tennis courts, a swimming pool, a bandstand, and baseball fields to the park. The Bertram-Huppertz house was at that time used as the athletic clubhouse and bath house. In 1944, the city started construction on Doris Miller Auditorium, named for Doris "Dorie" Miller, a native Texan and the first African-American awarded the Navy Cross.

In 1973, the historic Henry Green Madison cabin was re-assembled on the park property, after having been discovered on its original site on East 11th Street, framed within a larger house that was being demolished. In 1974 the cabin was named a State Historical Site by the Texas Historical Commission.
