= Rebecca Jane G. Fisher =

American philanthropist and preservationist

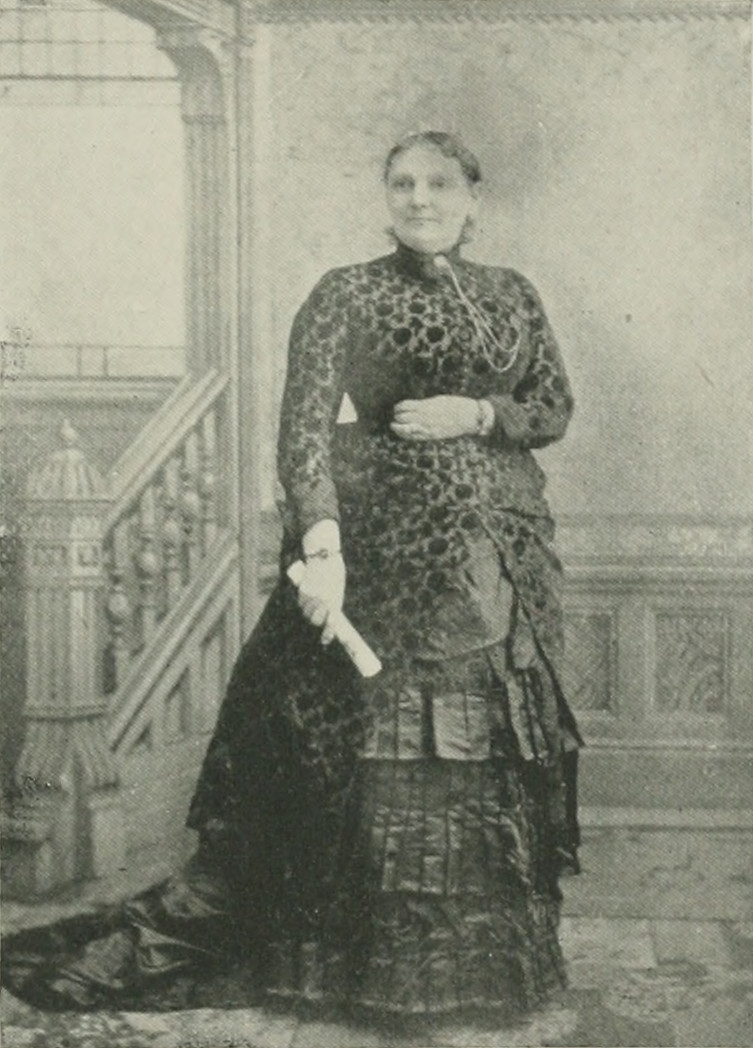
Rebecca Jane G. Fisher

Rebecca Jane Gilleland Fisher (August 31, 1831 – March 21, 1926) was a philanthropist and preservationist.

== Early life ==
Rebecca Jane Gilleland Fisher was born in Philadelphia, Pennsylvania on August 31, 1831. On both her father's, Johnson Gilleland, and mother's, Mary Barbour, side she was of distinguished ancestry, and belonged to the Johnstone, Barber and Chase families. Her parents were highly cultured and devout members of the Old School Presbyterian Church. Fisher's father moved to Texas with his family in 1837, believing it to be a good place for investment, but utterly ignorant of frontier life. They settled in Refugio County near the Don Carlos Ranch. Never having been inured to hardships, they were ill-prepared for the trials which awaited them. Her father joined the Texas army in 1838, and in 1840 both parents were killed by the Comanches who attacked their home. Rebecca Gilleland and her brother William were captured. In a few hours after the parents' death, the children were rescued by Albert Sidney Johnston and taken to Victoria and stayed with William C. Blair until their aunt, Jane Trimble of Galveston, took charge of them.

She attended Rutersville College from 1845 to 1848.

== Career ==
Fisher's fondness for literature was shown at an early age. For many years she contributed articles for the press, which received high encomiums.

For forty-five years she was actively engaged in church and charitable work. She was the president of various societies and associations. She was a strong advocate and worker in the temperance and missionary causes.

She was a charter member of the Daughters of the Republic of Texas and served as State President for 18 years. She was president of the Austin chapter. She was the only woman elected to the Texas Veterans Association and its last surviving member. She was the first woman to have her portrait hung in the Senate Chamber at the Texas Capitol.

== Personal life ==
In May 1848, she became the wife of Rev. Orceneth Fisher (died 1880), a Methodist minister, and they had six children. In 1855 they moved to the Pacific Coast, living in California and Oregon. They returned to Texas in 1871 and resided in Austin, Texas, for many years, and there she was held in the highest esteem and admired for her intellectual and Christian worth.

She died on March 21, 1926; her funeral was held in the Senate chamber; pallbearers included two senators and four governors. She was buried at Oakwood Cemetery (Austin, Texas).
