= H. P. Luckett House =

Historic house in Texas, US

- U.S. National Register of Historic Places
- Recorded Texas Historic Landmark
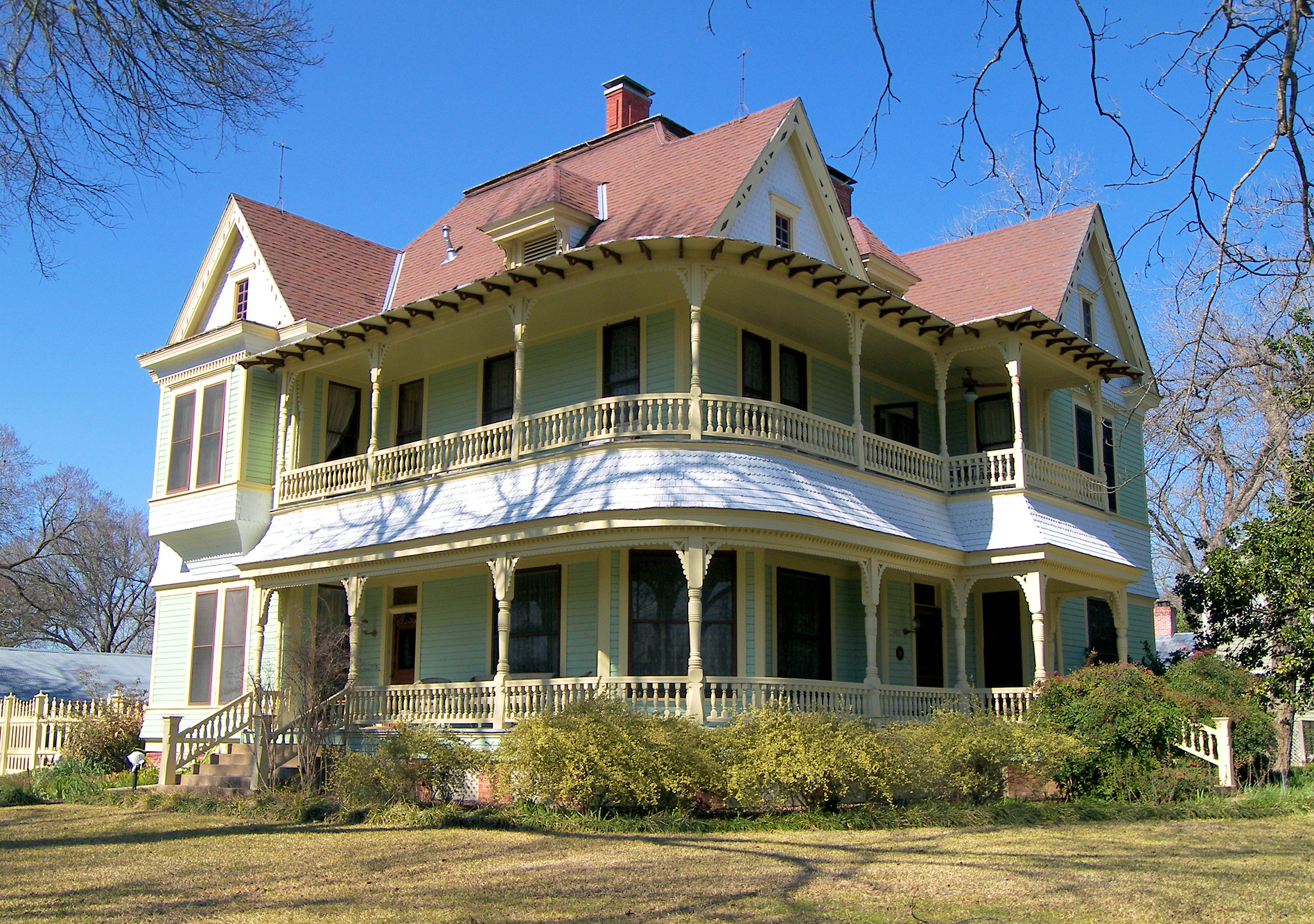
- H. P. Luckett House in 2007

- Location within Texas Location within the United States
- Location: 1402 Church St., Bastrop, Texas
- Coordinates: 30°6′54″N 97°19′18″W
- Area: less than one acre
- Built: 1892
- Architectural style: Late Victorian
- MPS: Bastrop Historic and Architectural MRA
- NRHP reference No.: 78003296
- RTHL No.: 16996

Significant dates
- Added to NRHP: December 22, 1978
- Designated RTHL: 2011

The H. P. Luckett House is a Queen Anne style house located in Bastrop, Texas. The 14-room house was built around 1892 for H. P. Luckett, a prominent citizen who had practiced medicine in the town for almost 50 years. The structure was listed in the National Register of Historic Places on December 22, 1978, and designated a Recorded Texas Historic Landmark in 2011.

The site of the Luckett house was originally occupied by the Bastrop Academy, one of the leading schools in Texas. Citizens of Bastrop founded the academy in 1851 and the school received its charter on January 24, 1852. It was rechartered under the auspices of the Methodist Episcopal Church, South, in 1853. In 1856, the male part of the academy became the Bastrop Military Institute, which trained young men for service during the Civil War. After the war, the Institute moved to Austin and the City of Bastrop purchased the property. The city used the buildings for a variety of schools, until a public school system was established in 1892, and the city sold off the property.

Luckett purchased the site and demolished the existing structures. The home he built cost $14,000 and featured carved entry doors and millwork brought in by flatcar from Houston.

The house last sold in 1983. The new owners were just the third family to live in the house in over 100 years.

In 2008, the house was used in a national Verizon Wireless television advertisement campaign as part of the "Don't be afraid of dead zones" series.

== See also ==
- National Register of Historic Places listings in Bastrop County, Texas
- Recorded Texas Historic Landmarks in Bastrop County
