= Susan Ballabina =

American academic administrator

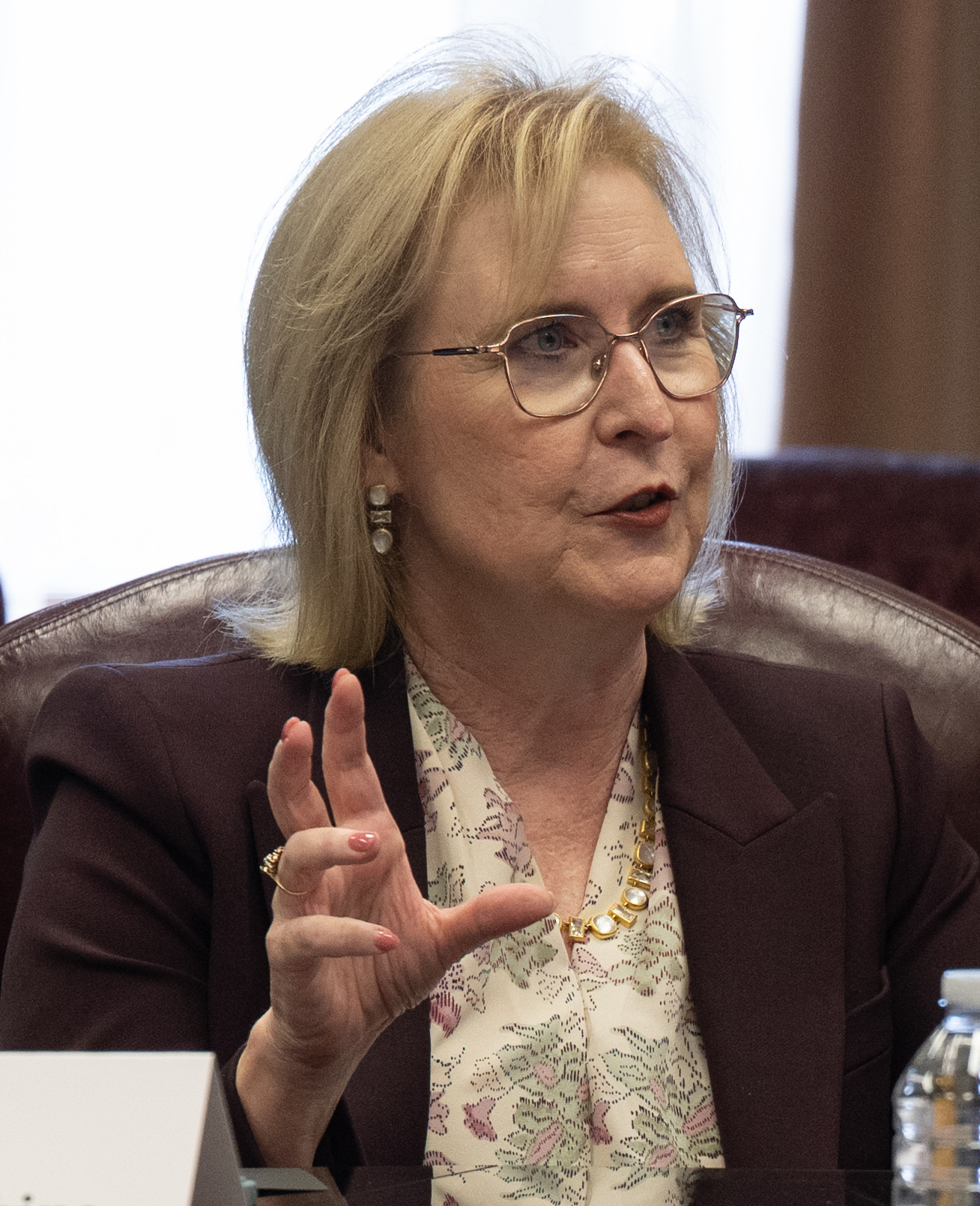
- Ballabina in 2026

28th President of Texas A&M University
- Incumbent
- Assumed office May 11, 2026
- Preceded by: Tommy Williams (interim)

Personal details
- Education: Tarleton State University; Stephen F. Austin State University; University of Texas at Dallas
- Website: Office of the President

Susan Ballabina is an American academic administrator serving as the 28th president of Texas A&M University since May 2026.

== Life ==
Ballabina earned a bachelor's degree from Tarleton State University. She completed a master's degree at Stephen F. Austin State University. She earned a doctorate in public affairs from University of Texas at Dallas.

Ballabina worked for Texas A&M AgriLife. She was chief of staff to Texas A&M president Mark Welsh. She later worked as the executive vice chancellor of Texas A&M University System. On May 11, 2026, she became the 28th president of Texas A&M University. Ballabina succeeded interim president Tommy Williams.
