= Henry Green Madison =

American politician

- Born: Henry Green Madison c. 1843; Memphis, Tennessee, U.S.
- Died: May 31, 1912 (aged 69); Austin, TX, U.S.
- Occupations: City councilman, police officer, unionist, farmer, shoemaker
- Spouse: Louisa Green
- Children: 9

Henry Green Madison (1843 – May 31, 1912) was a civic leader in Austin, Texas, and the city's first African American city councilman.

== Arrival in Austin ==
Madison came to Austin as a freedman in the early 1860s, and by 1863 had opened a shoemaking business and built a small log cabin at what is now 807 E. 11th Street. An active Unionist, in 1867 Madison was president of the Austin chapter of the Union League. He was an active participant in Reconstruction, and served as an assistant at the Texas Constitutional Convention of 1868–69. In 1870 he served as a captain of an all-black unit in the Sixth Regiment of the Texas State Guard.

== Political positions ==
Reconstructionist Governor Edmund J. Davis appointed Madison as an Austin city alderman in 1871. That same year he volunteered to serve as a registrar of voters in Travis County, a dangerous job for a black man in Reconstruction-era Texas, due to the continued opposition of black civil rights in the former Confederate State. Madison held his Alderman office until November 28, 1872.

Madison went on to serve as a policeman in the city of Austin and later worked as a porter in the Texas House of Representatives.

== Madison cabin ==
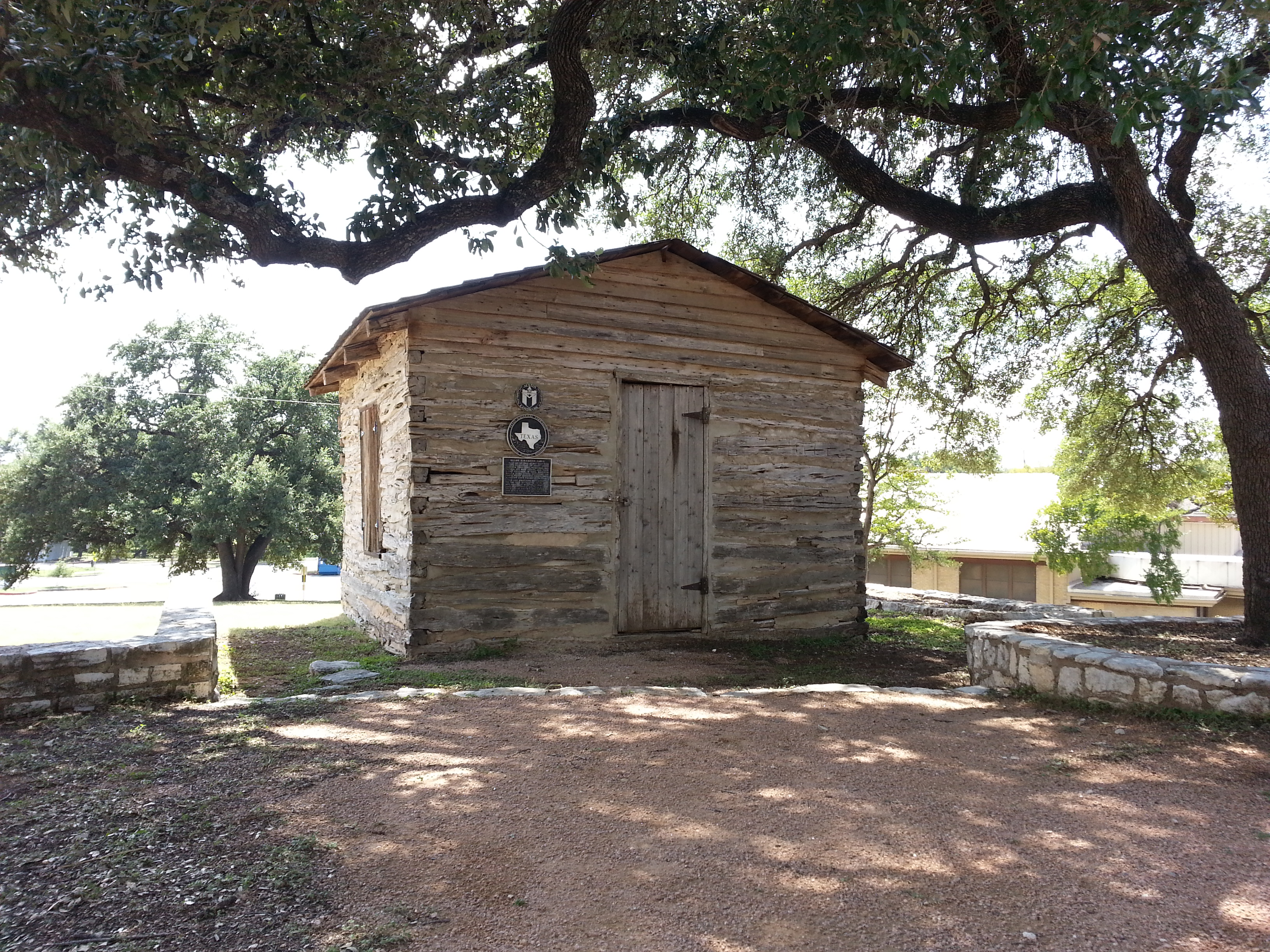
Madison's original cabin, relocated to East Austin's Rosewood Park

In 1886, Madison built a frame house which completely enclosed the original cabin on 11th Street. The cabin remained hidden until 1968, when a wrecking crew discovered it while tearing down the outer house. The cabin was donated to the city of Austin, and was disassembled and later re-assembled at its current location in Rosewood Neighborhood Park.

== Death ==
Madison died in Austin on May 31, 1912, and is buried in Austin's historic Oakwood Cemetery.
