= Hazen Graff Werner =

American methodist bishop

Hazen Graff Werner (29 July 1895–5 September 1988) was a bishop of The Methodist Church and The United Methodist Church, elected in 1948.

== Early life and education ==
Hazen was born in Detroit, Michigan, the son of Samuel Edgar and Emma (Graff) Werner. Hazen married Catherine Stewart, 22 May 1924. They had a daughter, Joy Ann, and a son, Stewart Hazen.

Hazen earned the A.B. degree from Albion College in 1920. He was a member of the Alpha Tau Omega fraternity. Hazen then attended Columbia University, and earned the B.D. degree from Drew Theological Seminary in 1923.

== Career ==
=== Ordained and Academic Ministry ===
He was ordained to the ministry of the Methodist Episcopal Church in 1924. He served the following pastoral appointments in Michigan: Westlawn and Cass Ave. M.E. Churches in Detroit and the Court Street Methodist Church in Flint. At these downtown Detroit churches he first developed what he called a Personal Trouble Clinic. This clinic was developed and operated in collaboration with a psychiatrist and a family visitor, and in co-operation with the Public Health Department, the Police Department, a Medical Center, and other public agencies. Much of his subsequent writing was drawn from his experiences in that work. Rev. Werner was lastly appointed pastor of the Grace Methodist Church located at 1029 Harvard Blvd., Dayton, Ohio.

In 1945 Werner became the Professor of Practical Theology at Drew Theological Seminary, Madison, New Jersey. There he taught seminary students the principles of counseling and the basic truths of the emotional life. He also contributed articles on counseling and personal problems to leading religious magazines of his day.

The Rev. Dr. Werner was elected a delegate to General and Jurisdictional Conferences of The Methodist Church, 1944-48. He also was the Chairman of the General Commission on World Peace and a New world order, and was a member of the General Commission of Evangelism and the State of the Church, both of the Methodist Church.

Werner was married to the former Helen Elsea in the 1980s.

=== Episcopal ministry ===
Upon his election as a Bishop he was assigned to the Ohio Episcopal Area, where he served as Resident Bishop from 1948 to 1964. From 1964 until his retirement in 1968 he was based in Manhattan as bishop of the church for Hong Kong and Taiwan.

Bishop Werner was a Mason and a member of Kiwanis. He enjoyed horseback riding as a leisure activity. He died of heart failure at his Saint Petersburg, Florida home.

== Selected writings ==
- And We Are Whole Again
- Real Living Takes Time (Nashville: Abingdon-Cokesbury Press, 1948.)
- No Saints Suddenly (Nashville: Abingdon Press, 1963.)

== See also ==
- List of bishops of the United Methodist Church
