= Matthew J. Hart =

American businessman

Matthew J. Hart was the President and COO of Hilton Hotels Corporation from May 2004 until October 2007, when the company was acquired by the Blackstone Group. On May 24, 2007, Hilton's Board of Directors announced that Hart would assume the role of President and CEO of the company effective January 1, 2008. However, Hart resigned following Blackstone's acquisition of the company.

== Early life and career ==
Hart obtained a Bachelor of Science from Vanderbilt University in 1974 and a Master of Business Administration from Columbia Business School in 1976. During his time at Vanderbilt, he was a brother of the Alpha Tau Omega fraternity.

Hart was a lending officer with Bankers Trust. He then joined Marriott Corporation in 1981. He eventually served as Executive Vice President and CFO for Host Marriott Corporation from 1993 to 1995. He later served as Senior Vice President and Treasurer for Walt Disney Company from 1995 to 1996. He then served as Executive Vice President, CFO, and Treasurer of Hilton Hotels Corporation from 1996 to 2004, eventually becoming President and COO from 2004 to 2007.
