= John Garland James =

2nd President of Texas A&M

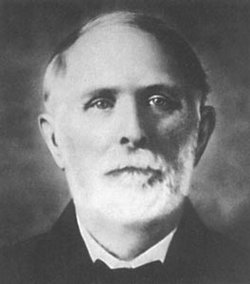
- Born: December 1, 1844; Palmyra, Virginia, U.S.
- Died: February 12, 1930 (aged 85); Dallas, Texas, U.S.
- Burial place: Oakwood Cemetery, Austin, Texas, U.S.
- Occupations: Academic administrator; banker; professor; soldier
- Known for: 1st initiate of Alpha Tau Omega fraternity; Superintendent of the Texas Military Institute; 2nd President of the A&M College of Texas; President of Panhandle National Bank
- Spouse: Clara White
- Children: 2 stepdaughters

Academic background
- Education: Virginia Military Institute

Academic work
- Discipline: Mental and moral philosophy; Political economy
- Institutions: Kentucky Military Institute; Texas Military Institute; Agricultural and Mechanical College of Texas
- Notable works: The Southern Student's Hand-Book of Selections for Reading and Oratory (1879)
- Military career
- Allegiance: Confederacy
- Branch: Confederate States Army
- Service years: 1864–1865
- Rank: Third Corporal
- Conflicts: American Civil War; Battle of New Market; Evacuation of Richmond

John Garland James (born December 1, 1844 – February 12, 1930) was an American Civil War veteran, banker and academic administrator. He was the second President of the Agricultural and Mechanical College of Texas (now Texas A&M University). He graduated from Virginia Military Institute in 1867. In 1865 while at VMI, he was the first initiate and a charter member of the Alpha Chapter of the Alpha Tau Omega fraternity.

== Early life ==
John Garland James was born in Palmyra, Fluvanna County, Virginia, on December 1, 1844, to Henry and Eliza Maria (Wills) James. He had an older brother, Charles Albert James, and a younger brother, Fleming Wills James.

== Education ==
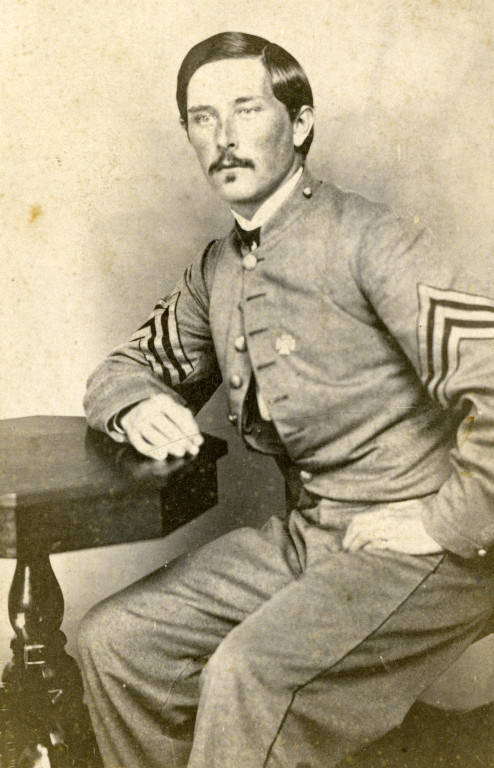
John Garland James, VMI 1866

=== Virginia Military Institute ===
James graduated from the Virginia Military Institute with second honors on July 4, 1866. During his college career, he served in the Confederate Army, acting as a color guard and third corporal in the Battle of New Market and fighting in the intermediate lines during the evacuation of Richmond in 1865. His brother Fleming fought alongside him.

=== Alpha Tau Omega ===
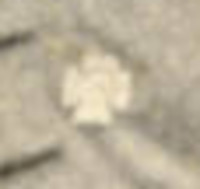
James' Badge

On September 11, 1865 after the conclusion of the Civil War, Alpha Tau Omega was founded by the three founders, Otis Alan Glazebrook, Alfred Marshall and Erskin Mayo Ross. In the Fall of that same year, the returning cadets were temporarily lodged in private residences and the hotels of Lexington, Virginia. Otis Alan Glazebrook and James were billeted in the same room of a private home. On opening day of classes, October 16, 1865, Glazebrook "approached" James to invite him into the Fraternity. James immediately accepted membership, and that evening Glazebrook and Alfred Marshall read to James the oaths which made him the first initiate of the Alpha Tau Omega and a charter member of the Alpha Chapter of ΑΤΩ. Close inspection of his picture in his cadet uniform reveals that he is wearing his ΑΤΩ badge on his chest.

Otis Alan Glazebrook, the valedictorian of the class of 1866 and the primary founder of ΑΤΩ, made the following statement regarding James. "James was the profoundest scholar I ever knew."

In 1929 James visited the University of Oklahoma chapter to witness an initiation. It was his first in-person interaction with the fraternity in over 6 decades. In describing the visit James said, "The fraternity has always been so precious to me, but now I Iove it more than ever."

== Career ==
=== Kentucky Military Institute ===
After graduating from the Virginia Military Institute, James served as a professor at the Kentucky Military Institute between 1866 and 1867.

=== Texas Military Institute ===
James and his entire family moved to Bastrop, Texas, in 1867, where James was president of the Texas Military Institute in 1868. He was the superintendent, business manager, and professor of philosophy and mathematics. His father, Henry James, and brothers, Charles Albert James and Fleming Wills James, assisted him along with his friend and fellow VMI alumnus Hardaway Hunt Dinwiddie. He later moved his school to Austin, Texas, conducting it there from 1870 through 1879.

His brother, Charles, died of tuberculosis in 1875 at the age of 34. He contracted the disease in a northern prison camp during the Civil War and one of the reasons he came to Texas was for his health.

After 1875, he was a member of the board of visitors of the United States Naval Academy.

=== A&M College of Texas ===
In November 1879, James was appointed as the second President of the A&M College of Texas, a position he would hold until his resignation on April 1, 1883. He was joined in the move by his friend and fellow Virginia Military Institute alumnus and Alpha Tau Omega member, Hardaway Hunt Dinwiddie.

James predecessor, Thomas S. Gathright, and his entire staff had been dismissed due to a scandalous rift between the faculty members. The board convened in Bryan in November 1879 to conduct hearings with regard to the issues at the college. The proceedings are well documented in the Galveston Daily News.

The scandal of the previous staff provided James' with considerable challenges. The enrollment had begun to fall, and by 1881 the number of cadets had fallen to 90 students. James focused on the Corps of Cadets, doing his utmost to ensure that they were well provided for and the improvement of the facilities.

By Spring of 1882, the enrollment had surged to 250 and James had new problems... "we [A&M] will be full to overflowing." However, this success was short lived. In November 1882 through early 1883, a dozen cadets and a faculty member died of influenza, measles, dysentery and/or other related disorders. Rumors began to surface statewide that the deaths were due to the poor location of the college. The enrollment challenges of the college were further pressed with the opening of the University of Texas in early 1883.

In 1881, concerned with the conditions at the college, a special Texas legislative committee visited the campus, In their report, it was noted, "It should be remembered, that its [the college's] retrograde tendency is due, in great measure, to the serious misunderstanding with the faculty and not the cadets." It implies that the primary reason for any negative changes or failures in the college's development during that time was due to issues or conflicts within the previous faculty. The committee further dispelled charges that the military training under the Morrill Act was given "too much prominence," responding resoundingly that "the military feature is of no disadvantage." The Corps and college were on the right track.

During his tenure, James taught mental and moral philosophy and political economy. He strongly advocated for the military training aspect of A&M's curriculum, aligning with his past as a VMI cadet, a Confederate soldier, and the Morrill Act's requirements for military education in land-grant colleges. The following is a quote from James regarding his beliefs about military training in an academic setting.

The military system of school government... tends to develop in the student a high sense of personal honor and moral responsibility, and to give him those habits of regularity, promptness, self-reliance, and respect for proper authority, which go far to make the good citizen and the successful man of business. It thus becomes a potent factor in the formation of true character.

In March 1883, James stepped down from the office of college president to join his brother Fleming in a banking venture in Colorado, Texas. He resigned due to frustration from the ongoing struggle to enhance the campus with limited resources and the political challenge of portraying the college positively in Austin and across state media. After leaving College Station he continued to support the college. He regularly communicated with state officials about the college's status and kept in touch with faculty and friends on campus. He became the President of Panhandle National Bank in 1884.

=== Southern Student's Hand-Book of Selections for Reading and Oratory ===
In the mid-1870s, James conceived the idea of a school reader and speaker consisting solely of works by Southern authors and orators. This led to the publication of "The Southern Student's Hand-Book of Selections for Reading and Oratory" by A. S. Barnes and Company in 1879, with a revised edition following less than a year later.

=== Banking, mortgage and real estate ===
On April 1, 1883, James left Texas A&M to join his brother Fleming in a banking venture in Colorado, Texas. He married Clara White (Brigham) Trowbridge, who had two daughters from a previous marriage, on February 6, 1883. By 1884, he was in Wichita Falls as president of the Panhandle National Bank. Around 1906, he began focusing on mortgages and real estate, living in Roff, Oklahoma, from 1900 to 1929.

== Legacy and death ==
When James was 79, he wrote the following about himself:

I am glad to say I still feel young, am active mentally and physically and can easily walk ten or twelve miles and stand about as much work as ever. Am temperate and ever have been, never a user of tobacco nor addicted to strong drink. Have been busy all my life and much interested in all that goes on Have accumulated very little, my life largely devoted to other things than money-making, and am better off, I reckon, than it I had a mil-lion dollars as a millstone around my neck. My library is my greatest pleasure, not a big one, but along lines that interest me, especially valuable in respect to literature of native authors of Spanish-American republics, Philippine Islands and West Indies. I have perhaps 1500 volumes in Spanish and about 500 volumes in French, (mainly French Revolution, Napoleon and the Ancient Regime), Italian, Portuguese, Catalan and Dialects of Spanish and French. I am fond of modern languages.

James went to Dallas for medical attention in 1929 and died there on February 11, 1930 at the age of 85, after an extended illness. He was buried in Oakwood Cemetery in Austin two days later.

Academic offices
Preceded by Thomas S. Gathright	President of the Agricultural & Mechanical College of Texas; 1879–1883	Succeeded by James Reid Cole
