= President of Texas A&M University =

Head of Texas A&M University

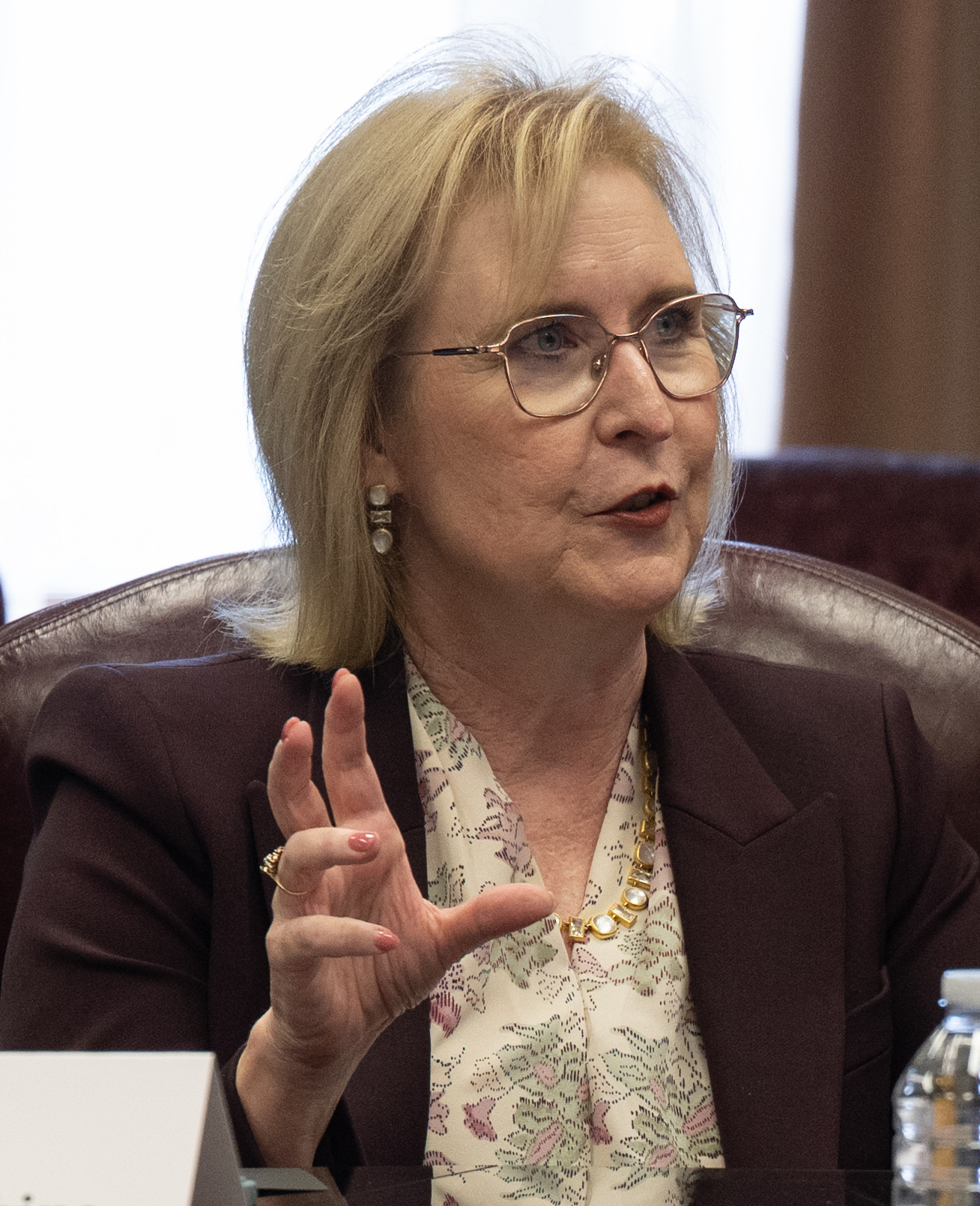
- Incumbent; Susan Ballabina since May 11, 2026
- Appointer: Texas A&M University System Board of Regents
- Inaugural holder: Thomas Sanford Gathright
- Formation: October 4, 1876
- Salary: $3,000 (1876) $1,100,000 (2023)
- Website: Office of the President

The president of Texas A&M University is the chief officer of the academic administration of Texas A&M University in College Station, Texas. Forty-four people—forty-one men and three women—have held this office, including those who were in the position when it was named chairman of the faculty between 1883 and 1890, and those who held the position in an acting or interim capacity.

Susan Ballabina is the current president of Texas A&M University since she was appointed to the position by the Texas A&M University System Board of Regents on May 11, 2026, as the successor of interim president Tommy Williams.

== Early history ==
On October 4, 1876, on the recommendation of former Confederate president Jefferson Davis after he had declined the position, Thomas Sanford Gathright became the first president of the Agricultural and Mechanical College of Texas (the future Texas A&M University). At the inauguration of the college, Gathright stated to those assembled

To the full success of the college, I can promise the best efforts of my colleagues in the faculty, as I pledge my own. They may not be the proper men to work out success, and may be called to give place to others. I may not be suited to my place, and may retire; still this great work, in which all the people of this good state are interested, must go on and must succeed.

== Presidents ==
The list of Texas A&M University presidents includes the previous presidents, and chairmen of the faculty of the Agricultural & Mechanical College of Texas. It also includes those that served in an acting or interim capacity.

The following persons have served as president of Texas A&M University:

No.	Portrait	President	Term start	Term end	Ref.
1		Thomas Sanford Gathright	July 15, 1876	November 21, 1879 (Note: Resigned after being asked to by the board of directors of the college following an investigation.)	
2		John Garland James	November 22, 1879	April 1, 1883 (Note: Resigned to join his brother in a banking venture in Colorado.)	
acting		James Reid Cole	April 1, 1883	June 26, 1883	
3		James Reid Cole	June 26, 1883	July 19, 1883	
4		Hardaway Hunt Dinwiddie	July 23, 1883	December 11, 1887	
5		Louis Lowry McInnis	January 24, 1888	July 1, 1890	
acting		William Stuart Lorraine Bringhurst	July 1, 1890	January 20, 1891	
6		Lawrence Sullivan Ross	January 20, 1891	January 3, 1898 (Note: Died in office.)	
acting		Roger Haddock Whitlock	January 3, 1898	July 1, 1898	
7		Lafayette Lumpkin Foster	July 1, 1898	December 2, 1901	
acting		Roger Haddock Whitlock	December 10, 1901	July 1, 1902	
8		David Franklin Houston	July 1, 1902	September 1, 1905	
9		Henry Hill Harrington	September 8, 1905	August 7, 1908 (Note: Resigned after a student-led strike after he forced a professor, Charles Hutson, to be quarantined after one of their grandchildren contracted whooping cough, which one of Harrington's two children died from the previous year.)	
10		Robert Teague Milner	September 1, 1908	October 1, 1913	
acting		Charles Puryear	September 1, 1913	August 24, 1914	
11		William Bennett Bizzell	August 25, 1914	September 1, 1925	
12		Thomas Otto Walton	September 3, 1925	August 7, 1943	
acting		Frank Cleveland Bolton	August 9, 1943	May 27, 1944	
12		Gibb Gilchrist	May 27, 1944	September 1, 1948	
13		Frank Cleveland Bolton	September 1, 1948	June 3, 1950	
14a		Marion Thomas Harrington	June 3, 1950	September 1, 1953	
15		David Hitchens Morgan	September 1, 1953	December 21, 1956	
acting		David Willard Williams	December 22, 1956	September 1, 1957	
14b		Marion Thomas Harrington	September 1, 1957	July 1, 1959	
16		James Earl Rudder	July 1, 1959	March 23, 1970	
acting		Alvin Roubal Luedecke	March 30, 1970	November 1, 1970	
17		Jack Kenny Williams	November 1, 1970	July 31, 1977	
18		Jarvis Ernest Miller	August 1, 1977	July 10, 1980	
acting		Charles Harold Samson Jr.	July 10, 1980	August 31, 1981	
19		Frank Everson Vandiver	September 1, 1981	August 31, 1988	
20		William Hodges Mobley	September 1, 1988	August 31, 1993	
acting		E. Dean Gage	September 1, 1993	June 1, 1994	
21		Ray M. Bowen	July 1, 1994	July 31, 2002	
22		Robert M. Gates	August 1, 2002	December 18, 2006 (Note: Resigned to become the U.S. Secretary of Defense.)	
interim		Ed J. Davis	December 18, 2006	January 3, 2008	
23		Elsa A. Murano	January 3, 2008	June 15, 2009	
interim		R. Bowen Loftin	June 15, 2009	February 12, 2010	
24		R. Bowen Loftin	February 12, 2010	January 13, 2014	
interim		Mark A. Hussey	January 14, 2014	April 30, 2015	
25		Michael K. Young	May 1, 2015	December 31, 2020	
interim		John L. Junkins	January 1, 2021	May 31, 2021	
26		M. Katherine Banks	June 1, 2021	July 20, 2023 (Note: Resigned after the failed hiring of professor Kathleen McElroy.)	
acting		Mark A. Welsh III	July 21, 2023	July 30, 2023	
interim		Mark A. Welsh III	July 30, 2023	December 12, 2023	
27		Mark A. Welsh III	December 12, 2023	September 19, 2025 (Note: Resigned after being presented with an ultimatum to resign or be fired by the chairman of the Texas A&M University System Board of Regents, Robert L. Albritton, and the chancellor of the Texas A&M University System, Glenn Hegar.)	
acting		James R. Hallmark	September 20, 2025	October 2, 2025	
interim		Tommy Williams	October 3, 2025	May 6, 2026	
28		Susan Ballabina	May 6, 2026	Present	

Table notes:
