= Gastroenterocolitis =

Inflammation of the stomach, small intestine and colon

Gastroenterocolitis is a condition characterized by inflammation of the stomach, small intestines, and colon.

== Signs and symptoms ==
The main symptom of gastroenteritis is diarrhea. Other symptoms may include:

- Abdominal pain or cramping
- Nausea
- Vomiting
- Low grade fever

Because of the symptoms of vomiting and diarrhea, people who have gastroenteritis can become dehydrated quickly. It is very important to watch for signs of dehydration.

== Causes ==
Common routes of infection include:

- Food
- Contaminated water
- Contact with an infected person
- Unwashed hands

Fifty to seventy percent of cases of gastroenteritis in adults are caused by noroviruses (genus Norovirus, family Caliciviridae). This virus is highly contagious and spreads rapidly. Norovirus is the most common cause of gastroenteritis in the United States.

== Diagnosis ==
The doctor will take a medical history to make sure that nothing else is causing the symptoms. Also, the doctor might perform a rectal or abdominal examination to exclude the possibilities of inflammatory bowel disease (e.g., Crohn's disease) and pelvic abscesses (pockets of pus). A stool culture (a laboratory test to identify bacteria and other organisms from a sample of feces) can be used to determine the specific virus or germ that is causing gastroenteritis.

== Prevention ==
With most infections, the key is to block the spread of the organism.

- Wash hands frequently
- Eat properly prepared and stored food.
- Bleach soiled laundry
- Vaccinations for Vibrio cholerae and rotavirus have been developed. Rotavirus vaccination is recommended for infants in the U.S. Vaccines for V. cholerae may be administered to individuals traveling to at-risk areas

== Treatment ==
The body can usually fight off the disease on its own. The most important factor when treating gastroenteritis is the replacement of fluids and electrolytes that are lost because of the diarrhea and vomiting.

Antibiotics will not be effective if the cause of gastroenteritis is a viral infection. Doctors usually do not recommend antidiarrheal medications (e.g., Loperamide) for gastroenteritis because they tend to prolong infection, especially in children.

Parasitic infections are difficult to treat. A number of drugs are available once the condition has been identified. Removing part of the colon or needle aspiration of abscesses in liver may be required.

== Prognosis ==
Depending on the cause of the inflammation, symptoms may last from one day to more than a week.

Gastroenteritis caused by viruses may last one to two days. Most people recover easily from a short episode of vomiting and diarrhea by drinking clear fluids to replace the fluid that was lost and then gradually progressing to a normal diet. But for others, especially infants and the elderly, the loss of bodily fluid with gastroenteritis can cause dehydration, which can be a life-threatening illness unless it is treated and fluids in the body are replaced.
