= H. P. Luckett =

American physician (1847–1925)

Humphrey Powell Luckett (1847–1925) was an American physician. He built the historic H. P. Luckett House. He was born May 26, 1847, in St. Charles County, Missouri, a son of Alfred and Susan (Hobbs) Luckett. His medical education was completed in 1867 at the University of Louisville, Kentucky.

On June 28, 1869, in Austin, Texas, Luckett married Frances Trask Haynie, daughter of Dr. Samuel G. and Hannah Maria (Evans) Haynie, of Austin. As a doctor of medicine, he practiced his profession at Bastrop, Texas. He died there on October 7, 1925; his widow died in 1930. (Mrs. Luckett was named for a pioneer school teacher in the Republic of Texas, Frances Trask).

One of their five sons was William Henry Luckett. He was commissioned a captain of the Army Medical Corps and served in France for 14 months, as a surgeon with the First Division, Field Hospital Number 12. He was cited for heroic services at the Battle of Soissons, First World War, having been 60 hours on his feet at the temporary hospital in the Château de Pierrepont.
