= William J. Hancock =

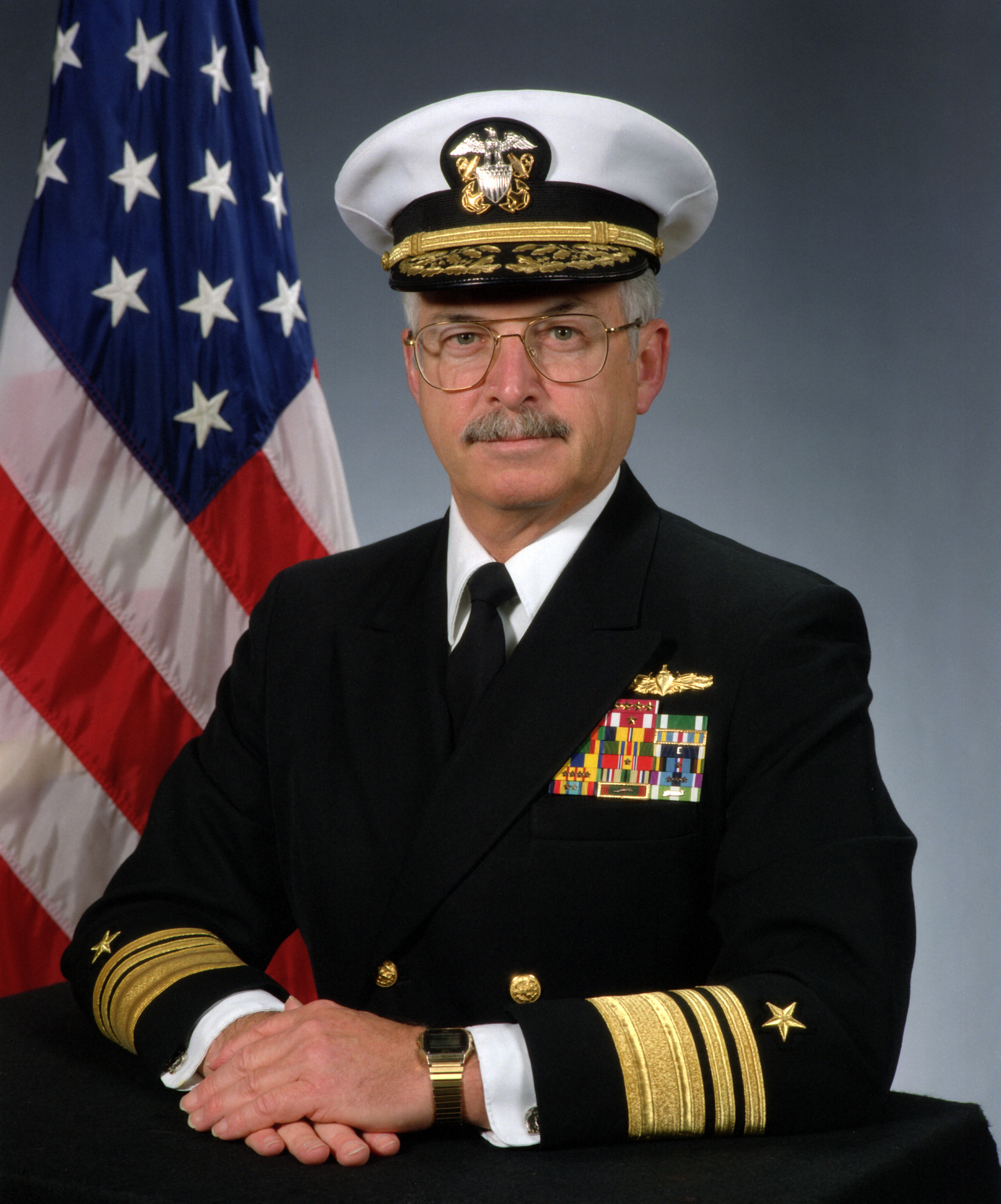
- Vice Admiral William J. Hancock in 1996
- Born: William John Hancock; October 23, 1942 (age 83); Davenport, Iowa, U.S.
- Allegiance: United States of America
- Branch: United States Navy
- Service years: 1965–1998
- Rank: Vice Admiral

William John Hancock (born October 23, 1942) is a retired United States Navy vice admiral who served as Deputy Chief of Naval Operations, Logistics. He had been Director of the US Navy's Office of Budget and Fiscal Management Division. He graduated from the United States Naval Academy in 1965 and was commissioned as an ensign. Hancock later earned a master's degree in Operations Research and Systems Analysis at the Naval Postgraduate School. After his retirement in October 1998, he worked as a consultant.
