= Edward Magruder Tutwiler =

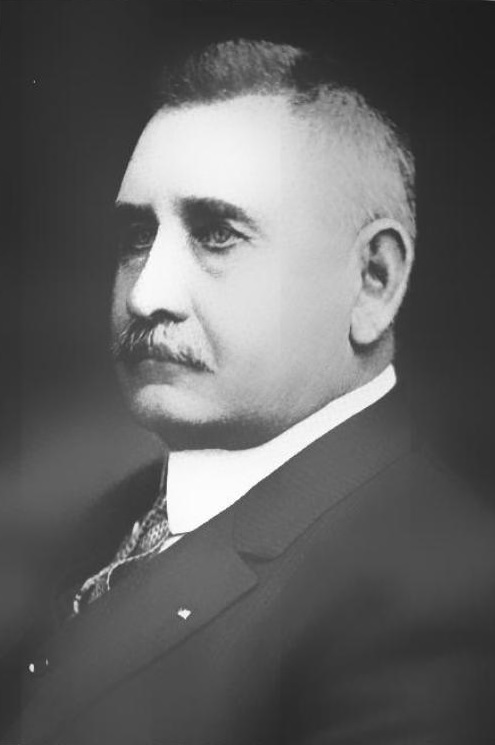
- Born: October 13, 1846; Palmyra, Virginia
- Died: April 19, 1925 (aged 78) at Sea
- Occupations: Civil engineer Industrialist
- Known for: Leading industrialist of Birmingham; Fought in the Battle of New Market
- Spouse: Mary Jeffrey
- Children: Temple W. Tutwiler; Edward M. Tutwiler, Jr. Herbert Tutwiler

Edward Magruder Tutwiler (October 13, 1846 – April 19, 1925) was an American industrialist and civil engineer who was a leading businessman in Birmingham, Alabama.

== Early life ==
Tutwiler was born on October 13, 1846, in Palmyra, Virginia, to Thomas H. Tutwiler and Harriet (Strange) Tutwiler. His father was a lawyer and served as commonwealth attorney and as a member of the Virginia Legislature for Fluvanna County.

== Education ==
=== Virginia Military Institute ===
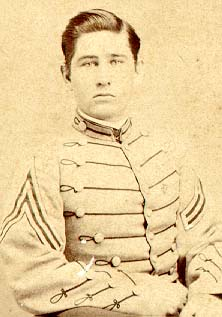
A young Tutwiler as a VMI cadet. Wearing the ΑΤΩ badge on his left breast.

In 1864, at age 17, Edward Magruder Tutweiler interrupted his studies at the Virginia Military Institute (VMI) to serve in the army of the Confederate States of America during the American Civil War. He fought in the Battle of New Market, during which many VMI cadets died. He served at the front until the evacuation of Richmond. When the war ended, he resumed his collegiate studies in engineering; he graduated in 1867 sixth in his class.

=== Alpha Tau Omega ===
In the Fall of 1865 he was initiated into Alpha Tau Omega fraternity at VMI, thus making him a charter member of the Alpha chapter.

== Career ==
For the following two years, Tutweiler earned his living as a teacher. He then began work as an engineer, taking a position as a rodman (a surveyor's assistant who holds the leveling rod) in the engineering corps of the Lehigh and Susquehanna Railroad. He was an indefatigable worker and made rapid advance in his profession during the next ten or twelve years. He served in various capacities, from locating engineer to chief engineer, in connection with the Chesapeake and Ohio, the Cincinnati Southern, the Miami Valley, the Richmond and Allegheny, and finally with the Georgia Pacific Railway. Tutwiler had the distinction of locating the eastern end of the Chesapeake and Ohio from Richmond to Newport News during the early 1870s. In 1879 he served one year as assistant engineer of the City of Cincinnati.

It was Tutwiler's connection with the Georgia Pacific that eventually led to his moving to Alabama in 1881. Two years later he became superintendent of the Sloss Company's coal mines at Coalburg, Brookside and Blossburg. In 1889 he organized the Tutwiler Coal, Coke & Iron Company, which became an important factor in the industrial life of Birmingham. In this company, Tutwiler pioneered a more benevolent relationship between management and employees.

In 1906, Tutwiler retired from the more active business pursuits of life to devote his attention to his private interests. He continued to serve in other capacities around Birmingham, however. He served on the board of director of the First National Bank, the Birmingham Underwriters, the Alabama Grocery Company, and Roberts & Son Printing Company. He also supplied much of the capital for the construction of the Tutwiler Hotel (now demolished) and the Ridgely Apartments (converted into the present-day Tutwiler Hotel) in Birmingham. He was a member of the Episcopal Church of the Advent and of various clubs and civic organizations.

== Personal life and death ==
In 1876 Tutwiler married Mary F. Jeffrey, who died in 1885. He had three sons with his wife Mary: Temple W., Edward M., Jr., and Herbert. In 1887 Mr. Tutwiler married his second wife, Margaret Lee Chewning of Virginia.

Tutwiler contracted pneumonia in early May 1924. Hoping that travel would help him recuperate, Tutwiler traveled with his wife to visit his son, who lived in India. Tutwiler died at sea aboard the Empress of France during the return voyage.
