= Alpha Tau Omega =

North American collegiate fraternity

- ΑΤΩ
- Founded: September 11, 1865; 161 years ago Virginia Military Institute
- Type: Social
- Affiliation: FFC; NIC
- Status: Active
- Scope: National (US)
- Motto: πι εψιλον πι
- Slogan: Love & Respect
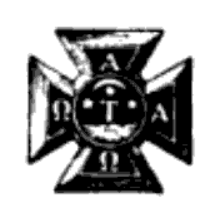
- Member badge
- Colors: Azure Blue and Old Gold
- Flag
- Flower: White Tea Rose
- Publication: The Palm
- Chapters: 125
- Colonies: 4
- Members: 7,000 active 229,000+ lifetime
- Nicknames: ATO, Alpha Tau, Tau
- Headquarters: 333 N. Alabama Street; Suite 220; Indianapolis, Indiana; United States
- Website: www.ato.org

Alpha Tau Omega (ΑΤΩ), commonly known as ATO, is an American social fraternity founded at the Virginia Military Institute in 1865 by Otis Allan Glazebrook. The fraternity has around 250 active and inactive chapters and colonies in the United States and has initiated more than 229,000 members. VMI Cadets are no longer associated with the fraternity. In 1885, the VMI Board of Visitors ruled that cadets could no longer join fraternities based on the belief that allegiance to a fraternal group undermined the cohesiveness of and loyalty to the Corps of Cadets.

Alpha Tau Omega represents one-third of the Lexington Triad, along with Kappa Alpha Order and Sigma Nu. The Fraternity does not have chapters or affiliations outside the United States. The fraternity's non-profit organization is The ATO Foundation, which provides scholarships to its members.

== History ==
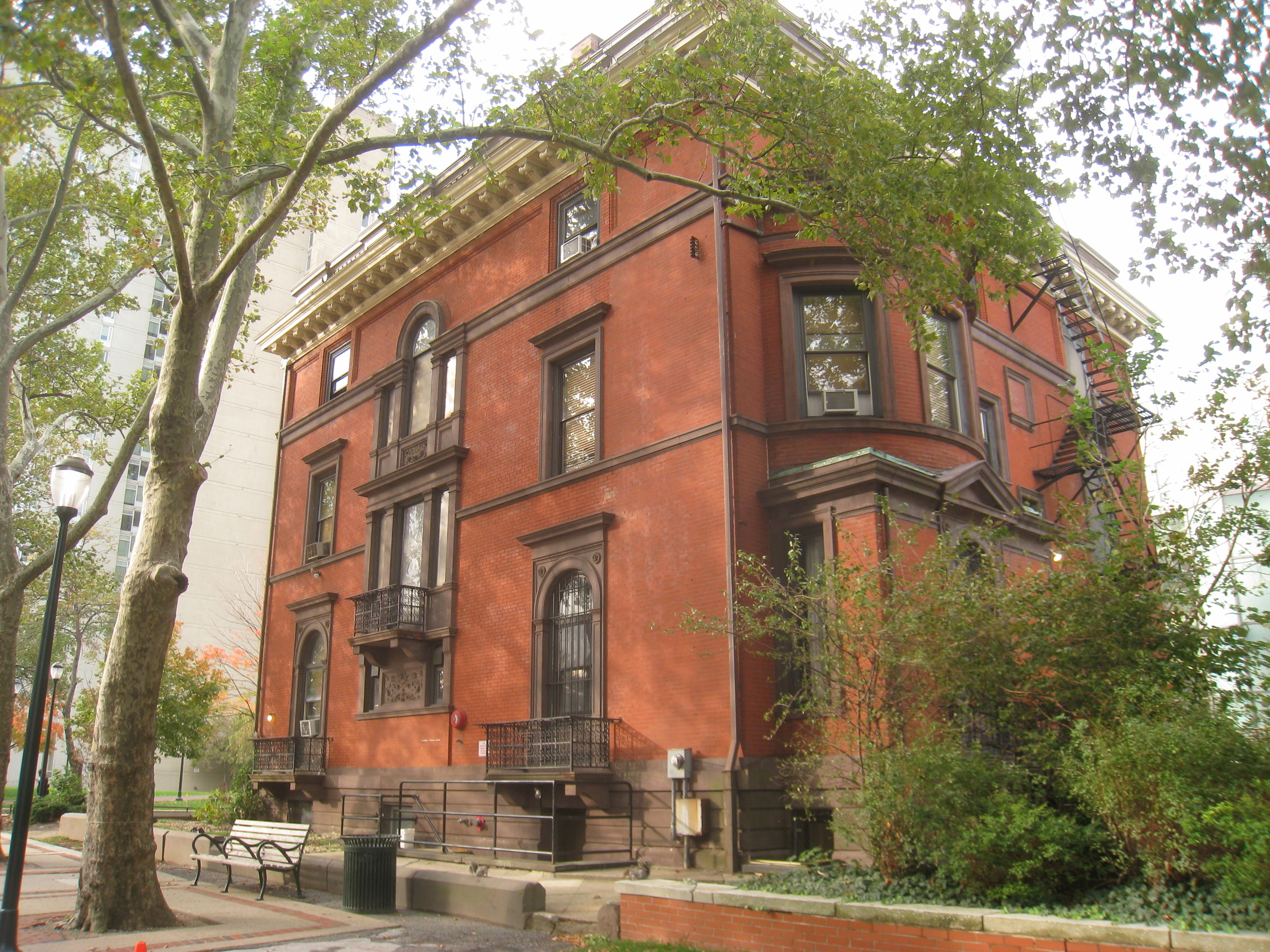
The Alpha Tau Omega house at the University of Pennsylvania in Philadelphia

Alpha Tau Omega was founded at the Virginia Military Institute on September 11, 1865, by Otis Allan Glazebrook, Erskine Mayo Ross, and Alfred Marshall. Glazebrook planned to use Christian brotherly love as a way to help facilitate reconciliation between the North and South in the aftermath of the American Civil War.

The charter members of Alpha Tau Omega initiated in the fall of 1865:

- Stephen Decatur Barrow
- William George Bennett
- Melville Irby Branch
- John A. Crichton
- Hardaway Hunt Dinwiddie
- John Garland James
- Samuel Houston Letcher:
- Archibald W. Overton
- George Spiller
- Edward Magruder Tutwiler

In 1935, Erskine Mayo Ross started the Alpha Tau Omega Foundation with a donation of $5,000. The foundation is a 501(c)(3) not-for-profit organization that provides educational opportunities and scholarships for the members of Alpha Tau Omega. Over $100,000 is available in grants and scholarships for undergraduate members.

The fraternity's headquarters was previously in Champaign, Illinois, and is currently in downtown Indianapolis, Indiana. Alpha Tau Omega is a member of the North American Interfraternity Conference.

== Symbols ==
Alpha Tau Omega's colors of azure blue and gold. Its flower is the White Tea Rose. Its symbol is the Heraldic Cross Pattee. Its motto is πι εψιλον πι. Its slogan is "Love & Respect".

=== Publications ===
Alpha Tau Omega has three publications, The Palm, which is the fraternity's semi-annual general magazine; ATO Leader, which is a bimonthly newsletter for chapter presidents and other organization leaders; and ATO Roadshow, which is a website designed to highlight individual chapter accomplishments and combat negative perceptions of fraternities.

== Activities ==
The fraternity holds several retreats and training conferences: Altitude, Encounter, Valiant, President's Retreat, and Emerging Leaders Conference.

Altitude is a rigorous leadership program designed to challenge ATO brothers physically, mentally, and emotionally. The six-day adventure is spent backpacking the wilderness of the Rocky Mountains with the goal of peaking a 14,000 ft. summit. Throughout the trip, truths involving leadership are reinforced. The week out West is designed to inspire men to lead their chapters more effectively.

Encounter is a three-day retreat designed to allow brothers to explore or deepen their spiritual identity. Through the retreat, the brothers will focus on Glazebrook's belief that unconditional love exemplified by Jesus is a powerful and regenerating dynamic.

Valiant Leadership Training program guides nearly 100 members through a values-based curriculum on how to lead with integrity. The intense programming strongly emphasizes the basic components of effective leadership, communication, ethics, goal setting, and teamwork.

Participants must be in good standing with their chapter to participate in Altitude, Encounter, and Valiant programming.

President's Retreat held every January in Indianapolis, is geared to better ensure that every ATO chapter President is prepared to take on his role and responsibilities. The weekend conference is packed with general leadership and chapter management information as well as unique opportunities to address individual chapter issues and initiatives. The Conference has evolved to now incorporate every Chapter President, Vice President, and Membership Educator.

Emerging Leaders Conferences are held every year in more than 20 cities across the United States serving almost 3,000 undergraduate members. The day-long program is designed to reinforce ATO for a Lifetime and demonstrate the benefits of belonging to a strong National Fraternity. Emerging Leaders Conference is designed to help every brother appreciate the importance of enhancing and strengthening their chapter experience.

In addition to these, LeaderShape was started in 1986 by the fraternity and was exclusive to members until 1988. LeaderShape was spun off into its organization which holds week-long leadership and networking retreats for college-age students.

== Richmond Property Group ==
Richmond Property Group, RPG, is designed to offer full-scale professional property management to preserve and protect the real estate assets of ATO. RPG handles many housing-related queries for undergraduate chapters; these can range from design and material selection to budgeting and collections. RPG works with a network of lenders around the country to assist in capital improvements, renovations, and construction projects.

== Local chapter or member misconduct ==
In 2008, the chapter at University of Nevada, Reno was suspended following controversy over hazing practices. As many as eleven pledges were forced to seek medical attention following their forced consumption of raw chicken, and the branding of the Greek letter Omega on their buttocks using dry ice.

In 2013, the chapter at Cornell University was shut down for repeated alcohol and drugs violations.

In 2015, the chapter at Indiana University Bloomington was shut down following controversy over hazing practices and the emergence of an explicit video involving active members and exotic dancers.

In 2017, the Texas State University chapter was suspended for three years after the alcohol-related death of a student at a party it co-hosted with other fraternities.

In 2018, the fraternity at the University of Kentucky had its charter revoked after the DUI arrest of a pledge following a traffic accident where a four-year-old boy was killed. This incident occurred after an off-campus fraternity sponsored tailgate party at a University football game.

In November 2019, a student named Sam Martinez died due to alcohol poisoning at an initiation event. Fifteen of the recent and former members of the Alpha Tau Omega fraternity at Washington State University were charged in connection with Martinez's death. The charge, furnishing liquor to minors, is a gross misdemeanor punishable by up to one year in jail and a $5,000 fine in the state of Washington.

In August 2020, the fraternity at Florida State University was suspended for five years, following incidents of hazing and alcohol use in the spring. On August 23, eleven former members of the ATO chapter were arrested following a party at the former chapter house associated with the group.

In 2022, six active members from the fraternity at Troy University were removed due to hazing and misconduct allegations.

In 2024, the chapter at Ohio State University was placed on interim suspension for potential hazing and student conduct abuse.

In 2026, the chapter at the University of Kansas was officially suspended and removed until January-May 2031 due to, "hazing, harm to persons and registered organization" policy violations.

== See also ==
- List of social fraternities
