= 1944 Cuba–Florida hurricane =

Category 4 Atlantic hurricane in 1944

Hurricane Thirteen 1944 San Lucas hurricane 1944 Sanibel Island hurricane
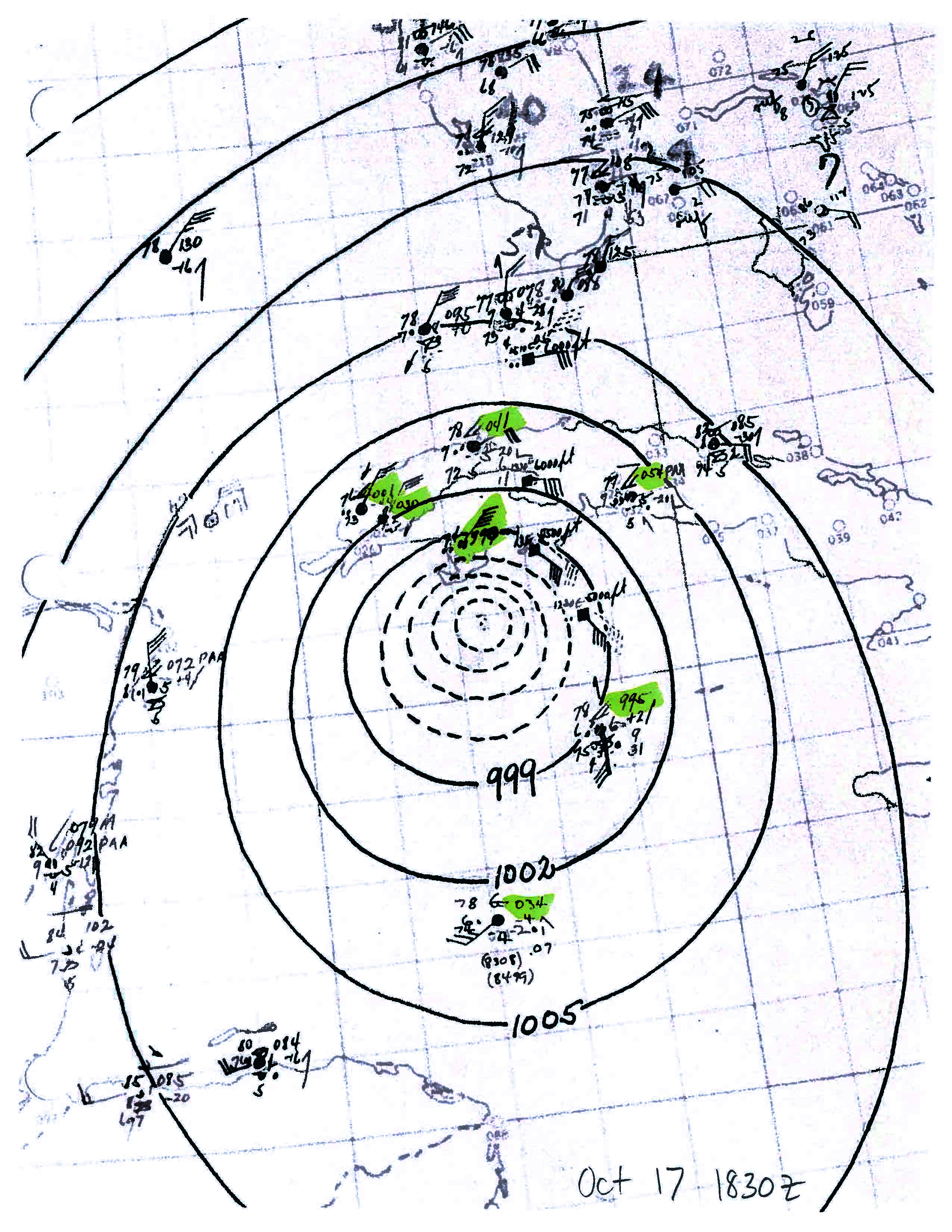
- Surface weather analysis conducted by the Atlantic hurricane reanalysis project of the storm as a Category 3 hurricane south of Cuba on October 17

Meteorological history
- Formed: October 12, 1944
- Extratropical: October 20, 1944
- Dissipated: October 24, 1944

Category 4 major hurricane
- 1-minute sustained (SSHWS/NWS)
- Highest winds: 145 mph (230 km/h)
- Lowest pressure: 937 mbar (hPa); 27.67 inHg

Overall effects
- Fatalities: 318 direct
- Damage: $100 million (1944 USD)
- Areas affected: Swan Islands, Cayman Islands, Cuba, Florida, United States East Coast, Atlantic Canada, Greenland
- IBTrACS
- Part of the 1944 Atlantic hurricane season

The 1944 Cuba–Florida hurricane (also known as the 1944 San Lucas hurricane and the 1944 Sanibel Island hurricane) was a large Category 4 tropical cyclone on the Saffir–Simpson hurricane wind scale that caused widespread damage across the western Caribbean Sea and Southeastern United States in October 1944. It inflicted over US$100 million in damage and caused at least 318 deaths, the majority of fatalities occurring in Cuba. (Note: All monetary figures are in their 1944 values unless otherwise noted.) One study suggested that an equivalent storm in 2018 would rank among the costliest U.S. hurricanes. The full extent of the storm's effects remains unclear due to a dearth of conclusive reports from rural areas of Cuba. The unprecedented availability of meteorological data during the hurricane marked a turning point in the United States Weather Bureau's ability to forecast tropical cyclones.

The disturbance began suddenly over the western Caribbean Sea, strengthening into a tropical storm on October 12 within hours of initial development. It intensified into a hurricane the next day, with a brief but slow westward path bringing it near Grand Cayman. There, the storm produced rough surf and torrential rainfall for several days, destroying all of the Cayman Islands' crops and damaging coastal property; the storm proved to be the rainiest hurricane in Grand Cayman's history. On October 16, the developing hurricane made a sharp turn northward and accelerated. It made landfall on western Cuba two days later at peak strength with winds of 145 mph (233 km/h), making it a Category 4 hurricane. Cuba, hardest hit by the storm, saw at least 300 people killed and suffered extensive damage inflicted by winds and storm surge, especially in the Havana area. Numerous ships sank in Havana Harbor amid agitated waters and marine debris.

A gradual weakening trend began after the hurricane crossed Cuba, attenuated by the storm's large size. It crossed the Dry Tortugas as a major hurricane on October 18 before making a final landfall near Sarasota, Florida, as a Category 2 hurricane the following day. (Note: A major hurricane is a storm that ranks as Category 3 or higher on the Saffir–Simpson hurricane scale.) Although property damage was considerable in the Florida Keys and throughout the Florida coasts, the bulk of the storm's damage toll arose from significant losses of crops in the state's citrus-producing regions, curtailing record harvests. Eighteen people were killed in the state, half from the loss of a ship in Tampa Bay. The storm continued to weaken as it passed over Florida and the Southeastern United States, producing heavy rains throughout the U.S. East Coast and gusty winds that led to widespread power outages. On October 20, the storm transitioned into an extratropical cyclone and tracked northeastwards along the U.S. East Coast. The system was last distinguishable east of Greenland four days later.

== Meteorological history ==
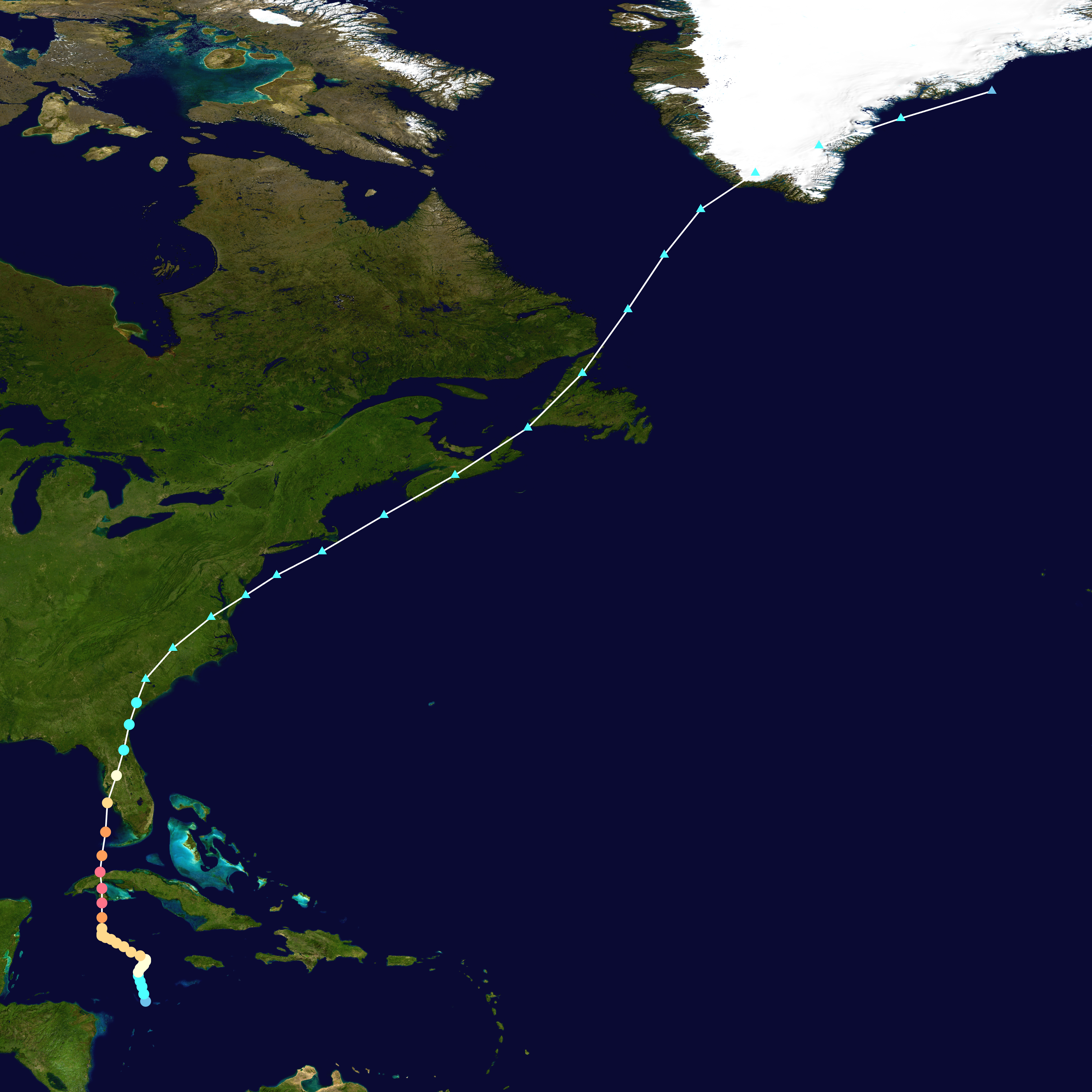
Map plotting the storm's track and intensity, according to the Saffir–Simpson scale Map key Saffir–Simpson scale Tropical depression (≤38 mph, ≤62 km/h) Tropical storm (39–73 mph, 63–118 km/h) Category 1 (74–95 mph, 119–153 km/h) Category 2 (96–110 mph, 154–177 km/h) Category 3 (111–129 mph, 178–208 km/h) Category 4 (130–156 mph, 209–251 km/h) Category 5 (≥157 mph, ≥252 km/h) Unknown Storm type Tropical cyclone Subtropical cyclone Extratropical cyclone, remnant low, tropical disturbance, or monsoon depression

The origin of this major hurricane was traced to a tropical disturbance that moved into the western Caribbean Sea by October 11, 1944. The system was initially broad; no observations of strong winds or low pressures indicated a tropical cyclone's presence. Nearby weather reports that day nonetheless suggested tropical cyclogenesis was underway. Based on aerial and surface observations, the Atlantic hurricane reanalysis project determined in 2013 that the system organized into a tropical depression by 12:00 UTC on October 12. Operationally, the first evidence of a developing cyclone was a report of rough seas later that evening by a ship 100 mi (160 km) east of the Swan Islands. The incipient system tracked towards the north, quickly intensifying; tropical storm intensity was attained just six hours after the initial tropical depression classification, and it strengthened into a hurricane by 18:00 UTC on October 13.

Two days later, the slow-moving hurricane took a more westward trajectory and passed south of Grand Cayman—sustained winds on the island peaked at 96 mph (154 km/h) with a gust to 118 mph (190 km/h), while the air pressure bottomed out at 984 mbar (hPa; 29.06 inHg). Between October 16–17, the storm made an abrupt turn towards the north along the 83rd meridian west and continued to strengthen, gradually accelerating northwards. It became a major hurricane by 18:00 UTC on October 17 and reached Category 4 intensity six hours later as it passed over the western portion of Isla de la Juventud, Cuba. The following morning, the cyclone reached its peak intensity with winds of 145 mph (233 km/h), a value extrapolated by the reanalysis project based on a pressure of 937 mbar (hPa; 27.67 inHg) observed on the northern coast of Cuba; this was the lowest pressure measured in connection with the hurricane. Maintaining peak strength, it made landfall on mainland Cuba at around 08:00 UTC on October 18, crossing the narrowest part of the island 10–15 mi (16–24 km) west of Havana before emerging into the Gulf of Mexico.

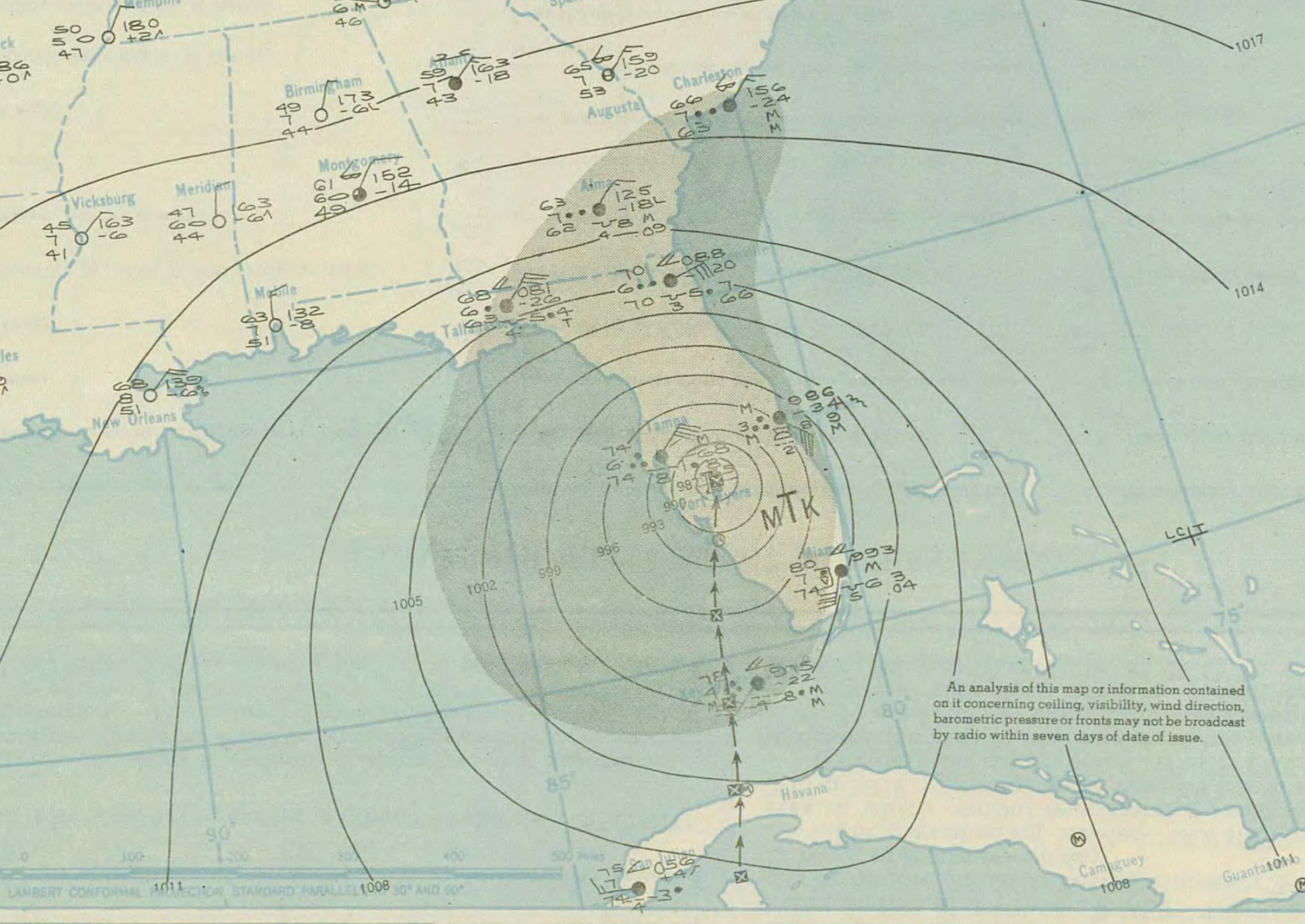
Weather map of the hurricane shortly after landfall in Florida on October 19

The hurricane's interaction with Cuba caused the winds to taper slightly, bringing the storm down from its peak intensity to a Category 3 hurricane over the Straits of Florida. At 21:00 UTC on October 18, the eye passed over the Dry Tortugas, producing two hours of calm over the islands. During its passage, the storm had winds estimated at 120 mph (190 km/h). It had grown considerably in areal extent, with a radius of maximum wind nearly twice as large as climatologically expected. Gradual weakening continued as the storm accelerated towards the north-northeast. This lessened the storm's winds to 105 mph (169 km/h)—a Category 2 hurricane—as it made landfall just south of Sarasota, Florida, at 07:00 UTC on October 19. Due to the cyclone's large size, its weakening over the Florida peninsula was anomalously slow and at times underestimated by the model typically used to estimate the inland decay of tropical cyclones. The storm was still a hurricane when it passed east of Tampa Bay and over Central Florida later that day; a pressure of 967 mbar (hPa; 28.55 inHg) recorded at a weather station in Tampa, Florida, was a record low for the site in its over-50-year observational history. The large hurricane finally weakened to tropical storm status south of Jacksonville, Florida, on the afternoon of October 19. It straddled the Georgia coast before pressing farther inland over South Carolina. As it did so, the storm began to become more baroclinic, transitioning into a fully extratropical cyclone over South Carolina on October 20. These extratropical remnants maintained their composure, emerging over the Atlantic along the coast of the Mid-Atlantic states and passing over Nova Scotia on October 21. Some re-intensification occurred as the system traversed the Labrador Sea and Greenland before it merged with the Icelandic Low on October 24.

== Warnings and preparations ==
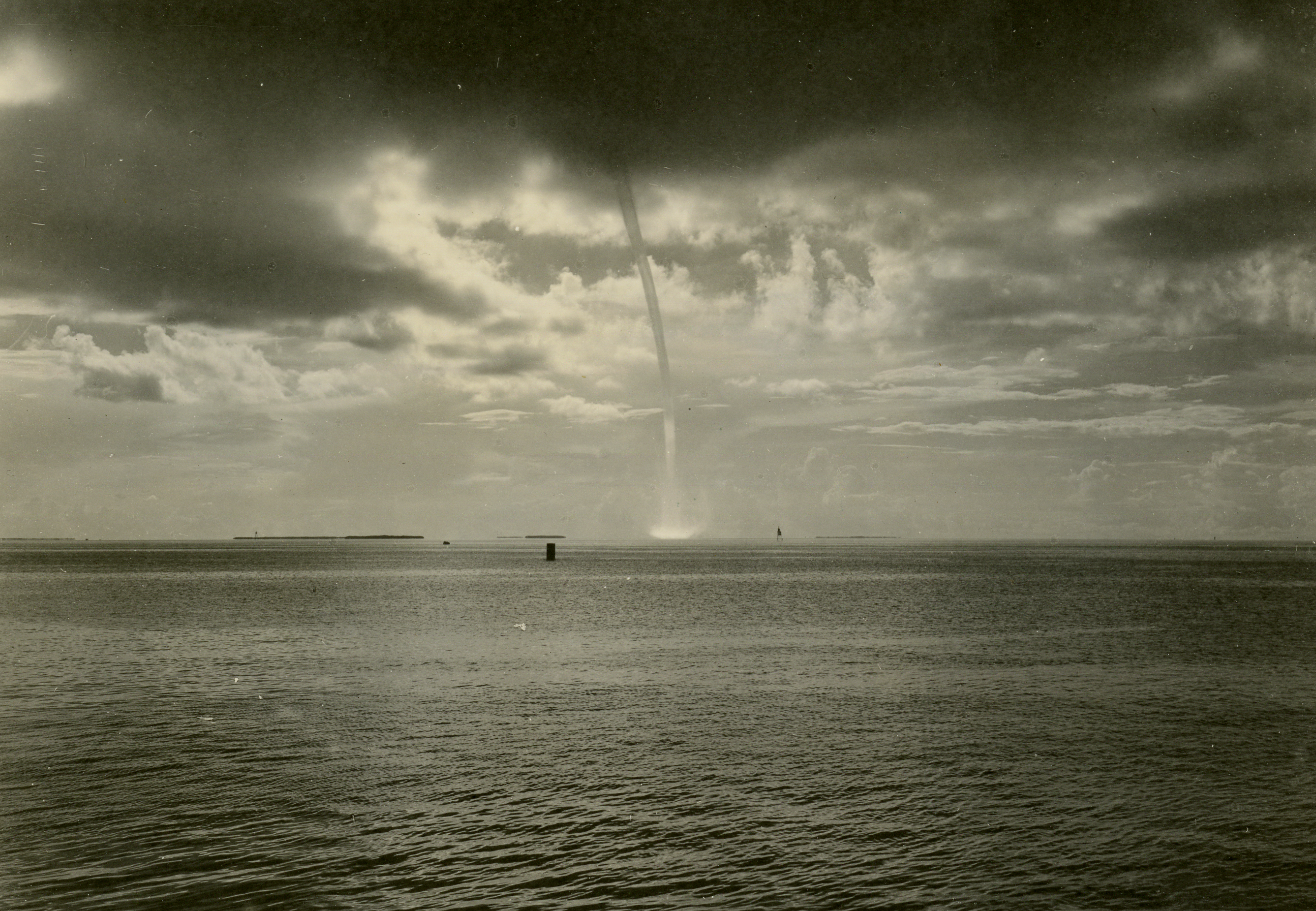
A waterspout near Key West, Florida, that preceded the storm's arrival

The United States Weather Bureau issued 58 storm warnings and advisories via its hurricane warning centers in Miami, Florida, Washington, D.C., and Boston, Massachusetts. The 1944 Cuba–Florida hurricane was the first time widespread rawinsonde data were available for a fully developed hurricane; the first complete atmospheric sounding from the center of a tropical cyclone was later collected by a rawinsonde in the eye of the storm as it crossed Tampa. The head of the Weather Bureau's hurricane forecast office in Miami, Grady Norton, used the information from these upper-tropospheric observations to accurately predict the storm's general northward trajectory, despite the presence of a high-pressure area at the surface that would conventionally prevent a northerly track. The accuracy of his forecasts surprised his colleagues and motivated the expansion of the American rawinsonde network:

The two major hurricanes of the 1944 season, the September hurricane, and the ... [Cuba–Florida hurricane], had circulation depth well above the top of ordinary pilot balloon observations. It was the ... [rawinsonde] data reaching to much greater height that told the story of future movements, and without them future movements could not have been indicated with as much certainty in the forecast. ... It is urgently recommended that the Weather Bureau lend all possible support to the establishment of additional ... [rawinsonde sites] in the Caribbean and Gulf area to further implement the hurricane warning service.

— Grady Norton, in his summary of the 1944 hurricane season

Cuba evacuated residents from its western low-lying coasts. The storm was considered the strongest hurricane to threaten the island nation since that of October 1926. Three thousand people sought refuge at El Capitolio, the nation's capitol building. U.S. soldiers stationed at San Antonio de los Baños Airfield were moved to the Cuban army's headquarters in Havana. Pan American World Airways canceled flights to and from Cuba in advance of the hurricane. Storm warnings in the United States were first issued for the Florida Keys on the morning of October 16. The Weather Bureau also noted a serious threat to western Cuba, the Yucatán Channel, and the Yucatán Peninsula. The first hurricane warnings were issued on the morning of October 18. At the height of the storm's impacts on Florida, hurricane warnings encompassed the Florida coast from Cedar Key on the Gulf coast to Fernandina Beach on the peninsula's Atlantic coast.

The Red Cross chapter in Key West, Florida, initiated emergency operations on the afternoon of October 17. Of the hurricane evacuees throughout the state, 35,000 stayed at Red Cross shelters. Excluding Key West, 90 percent of residents on the Florida Keys evacuated in advance of the storm. U.S. Army and Navy aircraft and non-essential personnel were evacuated from Florida. In the Miami area, flights were grounded and schools were closed. A total of sixty schools and public buildings in Miami were repurposed as shelters by the Red Cross. The University of Miami suspended classes for a day. U.S. Coast Guard personnel assisted in storm preparations, evacuating small craft and allocating vehicles for municipal emergency use. Schools were closed in Pinellas County in advance of the storm and repurposed as potential shelters, though ultimately none were used. Fort Myers served as a place of refuge for soldiers stationed at nearby Buckingham Army Airfield and surrounding areas around the city. Storm preparations also began farther inland, with relief operations and evacuations in the Orlando area coordinated between the Red Cross and the Army Air Forces Tactical Center.

On October 19, 125 people were evacuated from Sullivan's Island and Isle of Palms in South Carolina and housed at a county hall. Residents of Avon, North Carolina, were evacuated to Manteo and Elizabeth City late that day in advance of the weakened storm's approach. Five hundred people evacuated Long Beach Island off mainland New Jersey ahead of the hurricane's extratropical stages.

== Impact ==
In the Monthly Weather Review, the United States Weather Bureau enumerated 318 deaths from the hurricane, noting that reports possibly indicating more deaths were yet to be received from Cuba and the Cayman Islands. The hurricane caused over $100 million in damage across its path.

=== Caribbean Sea ===
Wettest tropical cyclones and their remnants in the Cayman Islands Highest-known totals
Precipitation			Storm	Location	Ref.
Rank	mm	in	Storm	Location	Ref.
1	794.8	31.29	Unnamed, 1944	Grand Cayman Island	
2	577	22.72	Alberto, 2006	Owen Roberts International Airport	
3	552.2	21.74	Isidore, 2002	Cayman Brac	
4	451.4	17.77	Paloma, 2008	Cayman Brac	
5	308.4	12.14	Ivan, 2004	Grand Cayman Island	
6	292.1	11.50	Hattie, 1961	Grand Cayman Island	
7	229.1	9.02	Nicole, 2010	Owen Roberts International Airport	
8	165.6	6.52	Michelle, 2001	Grand Cayman Island	

The hurricane brought squally conditions and rough surf to the Swan Islands over six days, the strongest measured gust reaching 58 mph (93 km/h). Three days of hurricane conditions destroyed all crops on the Cayman Islands. Rainfall totals reached 31.29 in (795 mm) on Grand Cayman—the highest rainfall total caused by a hurricane in the island's history. Red Bay and Prospect were flooded by the precipitation. Heavy seas destroyed many wooden shoreline installations including docks and piers, and extensive beach erosion exposed limestone outcrops. Three small ships were either lost or destroyed in the Caymans; one ship was later found aground off Pinar del Río in Cuba. Winds in Georgetown reached 116 mph (187 km/h), cutting communications between the city and the outside world. Considerable road damage was reported throughout Grand Cayman. E. S. Parsons, the clerk of the Grand Court of the Cayman Islands, said the storm was Grand Cayman's "severest hurricane since 1876".

Cuba was the nation hardest hit by the hurricane, though the full extent of casualties remains unknown as reports from rural areas of the island were never realized. Damage was most severe in eastern Pinar del Río. A powerful storm surge killed 20 people in a small village. The coastal port of Surgidero de Batabanó was destroyed, and 24 deaths were reported. The port's entire fishing fleet—numbering over 20 schooners—was carried inland by the storm surge, as was a Standard Oil barge that ended up 10 mi (16 km) inland. Havana Harbor was forced to close because of excessive debris and sunken craft in its waters. Two schooners running cargo routes between Havana and Miami sank in the harbor, as well as Cuban and Peruvian submarine chasers. One capsized vessel blocked the entrance to the harbor, preventing through traffic. A wind gust of 163 mph (262 km/h) was documented in Havana while the eye passed 10–15 mi (16–24 km) to the west; this was the strongest gust measured in Cuba until Hurricane Gustav in 2008. Hurricane-force winds were felt for 14 hours with gusts exceeding 125 mph (201 km/h) for seven hours. The strong winds cut off most electricity in Havana and government telecommunications in Nueva Gerona, the capital of Isla de la Juventud, for three days. Buildings in Havana suffered extensively, exacerbated by felled trees and flying debris. Administrative buildings including the Presidential Palace and the American embassy sustained considerable damage. Preliminary estimates of the total loss incurred by the city reached several hundred thousand U.S. dollars. There were seven deaths and four hundred injuries. The damage on Isla de la Juventud was extensive but less than initially feared.

In total, about half the crops in the outlying areas of Havana were lost, as well as 90 percent of tobacco warehouses. The storm's effects on the Cuban sugar crop remained uncertain, with estimates ranging from a four percent loss to a net increase due to beneficial rainfall. The total loss of food in Cuba was estimated by the U.S. embassy to be worth $3,000,000. This led to food shortages in the Cuban provinces of La Habana and Matanzas and the Sabana-Camagüey Archipelago.

=== Florida ===
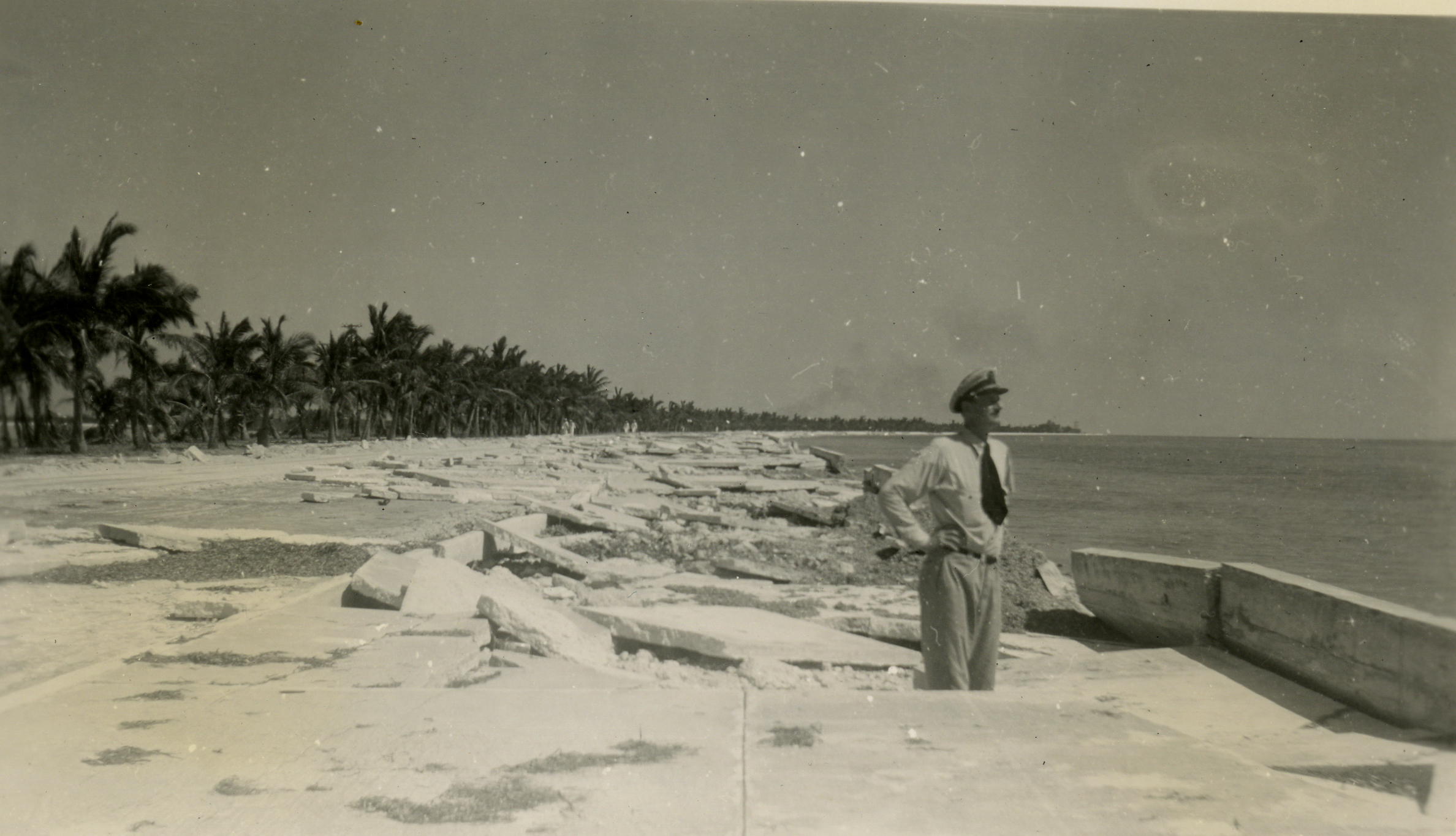
Coastal storm surge inflicted most of the property damage in Florida.

The hurricane caused $63 million in damages—largely to crops—in Florida. Eighteen deaths occurred in the state, including nine seamen who drowned when a tugboat sank off Bradenton; another 24 people were hospitalized for storm-related injuries elsewhere. In its monthly Climatological Data publication, the Weather Bureau said that "systematic evacuation of all dangerously exposed beaches doubtless saved many lives". In 2018, an analysis of historical U.S. landfalls suggested that a similar storm striking the same areas would inflict $73.5 billion in damage when normalized for 2018 demographics and inflation.

On October 15, showers streaming north from the hurricane produced heavy rain and 25 mph (40 km/h) gusts over Florida. An instruction flight out of Naval Air Station Lake City crashed shortly after takeoff 5.5 mi (8.9 km) east of the base, weather being cited as a likely cause. All three crewmembers were killed. In advance of the eventual landfall, three tornadoes in the hurricane's rainbands struck the state on the afternoon of October 18, causing slight damage. They touched down in the cities of Arcadia and Wauchula as well as southern Polk County. The Wauchula tornado displaced a farmhouse from its foundation, unroofed a gas station, and uprooted 75 trees. Waterspouts were also observed before the hurricane's arrival.

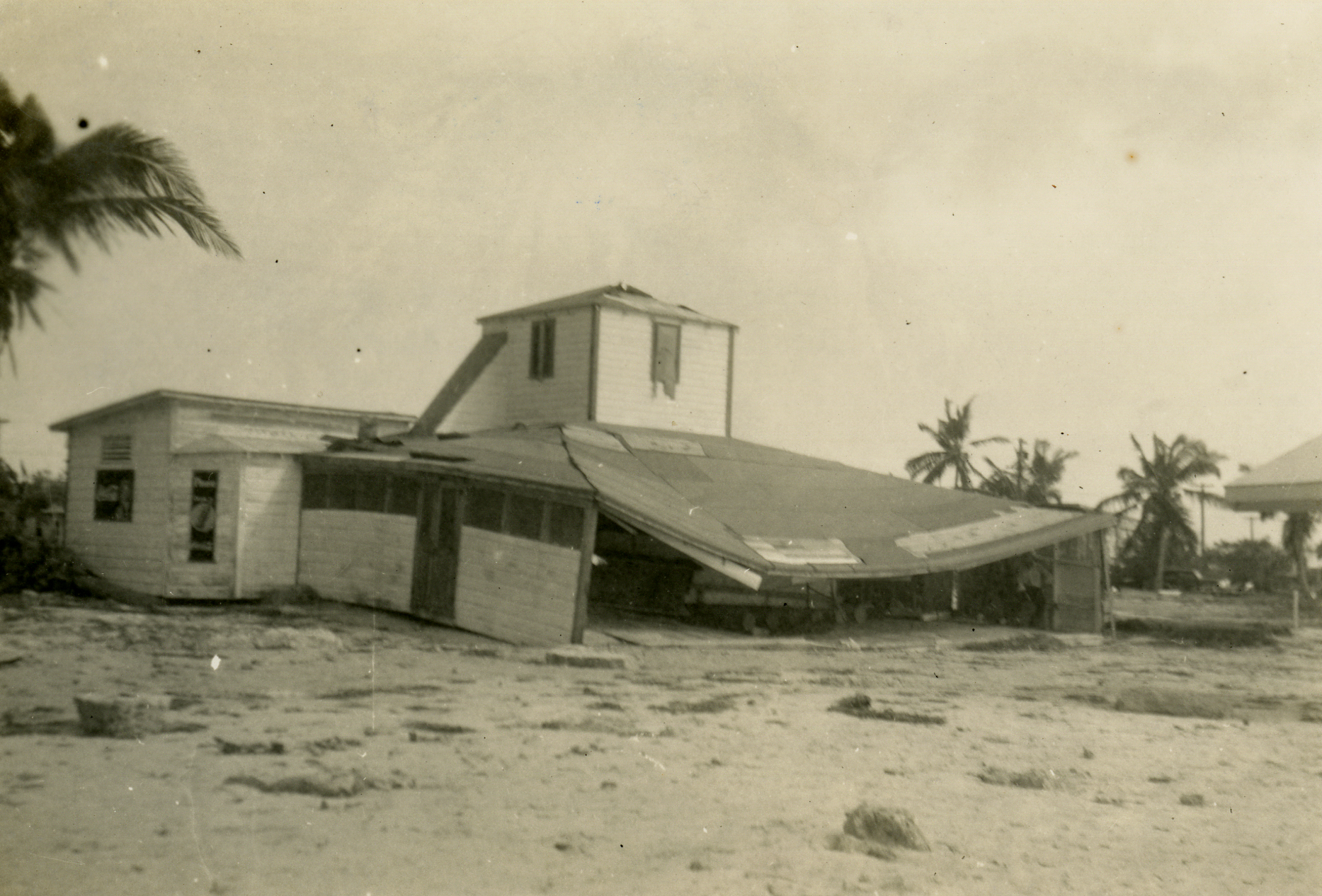
A damaged building after the hurricane

On the Dry Tortugas, an anemometer indicated winds of 120 mph (190 km/h) for two consecutive hours before it succumbed. Key West avoided the brunt of the storm as the eye passed 40 mi (65 km) to the west. No casualties were reported there, though infrastructure damage was considerable. In the rest of Monroe County, there were only two minor injuries. The hurricane's effects resulted in the loss of electricity and gas service to Key West. Roughly a third of the city was inundated by floodwaters, reaching a depth of at least 3 ft (0.91 m) and displacing approximately 5,000 people. The strong winds felled numerous trees, some blocking roadways. Many homes were damaged, including one removed from its foundation. Throughout the Florida Keys, the hurricane produced significant beach erosion. Beaches in Key West and Boca Chica Key were narrowed considerably, exacerbating the shoreline impacts of future hurricanes in 1948 and 1998. A 250 ft (76 m)-long segment of seawall typically rising 8 ft (2.4 m) above average high tide was destroyed in Key West, resulting in the flooding of an adjacent estate. In total, 4,000 ft (1,200 m) of seawall and road along South Roosevelt Boulevard was destroyed; it was repaired in 1951. Six U.S. Navy vessels ran aground along Key West. Farther offshore, a crew of 21 people was forced to abandon a lightship near the northwest entrance to the harbor at Key West while the storm passed.

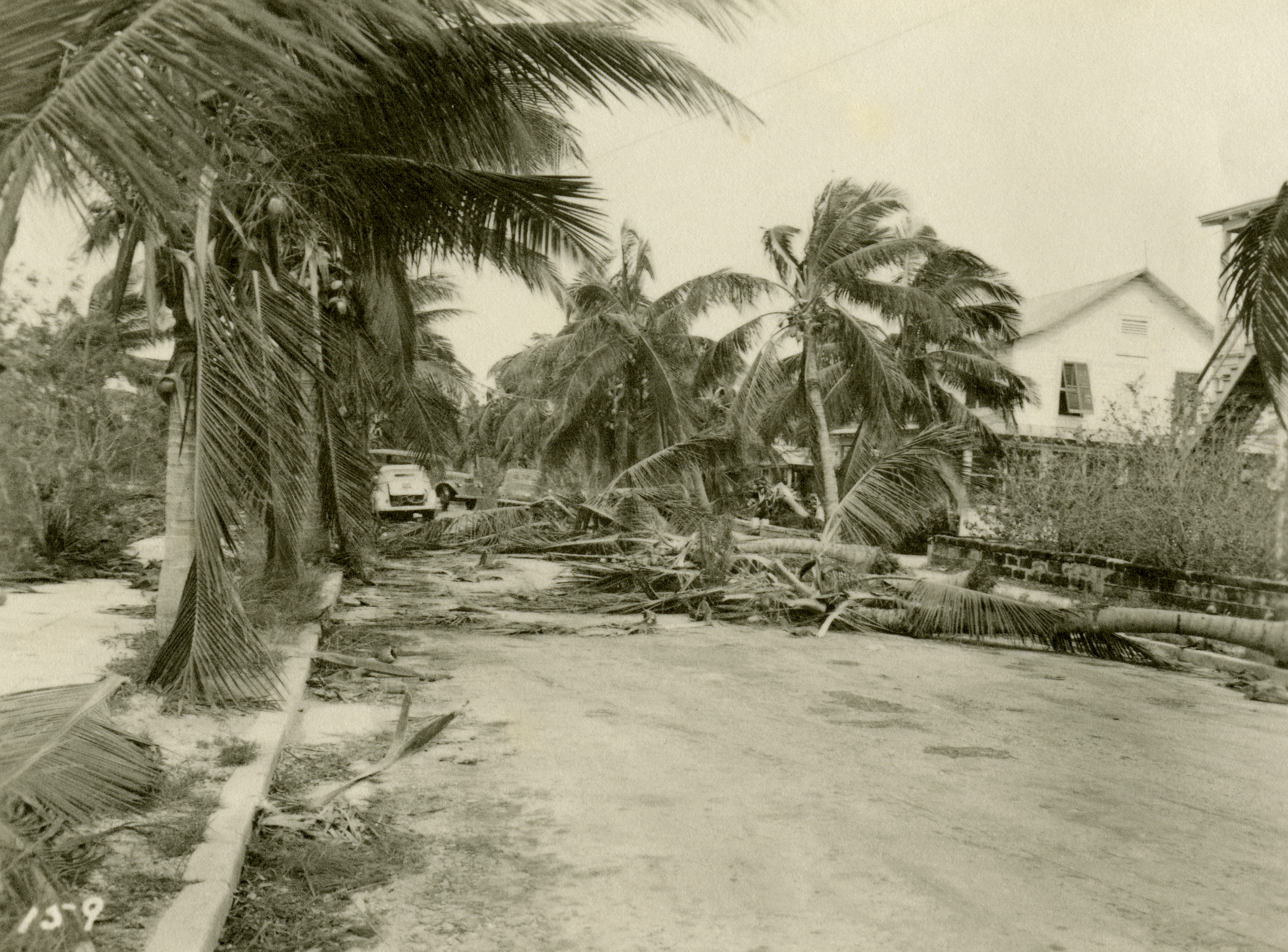
Strong winds from the hurricane downed trees in many Floridan communities.

The majority of the $10–$13 million toll inflicted to property occurred along the coast, particularly from storm surge. It was highest on the western coast between Sarasota and the Everglades, the greatest tide-related damage occurring along the beaches of Fort Myers. At least fifteen cottages were destroyed on Estero Island, where Fort Myers Beach is located, as well as the island's fishing pier. The entire island was inundated under 3–6 ft (0.91–1.83 m) of seawater, flooding buildings. One apartment complex was half destroyed, part of its foundation caving in. Other longstanding landmarks on Fort Myers Beach were either destroyed or sustained severe damage, and many ships were lost or grounded well inland. The surge accumulated upstream in the Caloosahatchee River, flooding roads with 3–5 ft (0.91–1.52 m) of water.

The hurricane's highest storm surge measured in Florida was 12.28 ft (3.74 m) above mean low tide at Jacksonville Beach. At the time, the 7.1 ft (2.2 m) high storm surge measured at Fernandina Beach was the second-highest observed there on record. There, nearly 50 beach houses collapsed, contributing to a $500,000 damage toll. As much as 150 ft (46 m) of beach eroded because of the elevated seas at Fernandina Beach. Winds of 35 mph (56 km/h) tore awnings and broke windows in downtown Jacksonville, and brought down the antenna of radio station WJCT. Waist-deep water in St. Augustine flooded many buildings including the headquarters of the St. Augustine Record newspaper, which did not print for the first time in a half-century. At an airfield near Daytona Beach, two hangars sustained heavy damage; three planes were damaged and two were destroyed. Off Cape Canaveral, two shrimp boats were stranded in the storm and eventually beached along Cocoa. Rough seas also washed out a segment of the bridge connecting Cocoa with Merritt Island. Likewise, a 100 ft (30 m)-section of the bridge between Titusville and the coast collapsed into the river below. Three commercial fishing vessels were either sunk or awash at Pass-a-Grille, and several sport craft were lost. Rough surf also occurred in Florida's interior lakes, waves in Lake Tohopekaliga breaching several hundred feet of seawall near Kissimmee.

Damage was widespread across the western coast of the Florida peninsula, though its severity varied greatly. The Sarasota and Venice areas where the hurricane made landfall were particularly hard hit. Numerous groves in the region were damaged by high gusts. The combination of fallen trees, downed power lines, and storm surge blocked roadways. Punta Gorda farther south mostly avoided the storm's damaging effects, though downed trees were reported at nearby Nocatee and Arcadia. Communication service in Fort Myers suffered greatly, limiting connectivity to proximate locales. Sustained winds at Page Field were clocked at 90 mph (140 km/h) with gusts exceeding 100 mph (160 km/h).

Trees were downed in St. Petersburg by gusts to 90 mph (140 km/h). Power outages were extensive, exacerbated by an unexpected short-circuiting of an electrical plant during the storm. These outages disrupted the city's streetcar and water pump systems. Windows were blown out of 20 storefronts, and roofs were torn off some homes. Structural damage was minor overall, with damage evaluated at $25,000–$50,000. Damage from citrus losses and property damage in the rest of Pinellas County was valued at $1,000,000. Offshore, nine people were killed, and three crew members survived, after their ship sank at the mouth of Tampa Bay; Tampa suffered similarly to St. Petersburg, and experienced a lull in the winds as the center of the hurricane passed overhead. Plate glass windows and storefronts in the downtown area were broken. Short-circuiting wires triggered by the storm caused two major fires, destroying a home and burning most of a shipyard shop; Tampa firefighters also responded to another eight fires during the hurricane, though these caused minor damage. Strong winds uprooted trees in the Davis Islands and Gulfport along the coast of the Tampa Bay area. Similarly, downed trees were characteristic of the damage in Clearwater. Roofs of older buildings were torn by the strong winds, though damage overall was slight.

Although storm damage in Miami was relatively minor, two people were killed—one from a downed electric line and another from a traffic collision—in the greater metropolitan area. Early green bean and tomato crops in neighboring Palm Beach County were ruined by the hurricane. Between 500–900 acres (200–360 ha) of snap bean crops were lost throughout the Everglades, battered by excessive rainfall of 8–10 in (200–250 mm), but growers were optimistic the rains would later lead to improved harvests. A 300 ft (91 m)-stretch of seawall was destroyed in El Cid Historic District along with an adjacent dock; this was the only structural damage in West Palm Beach.

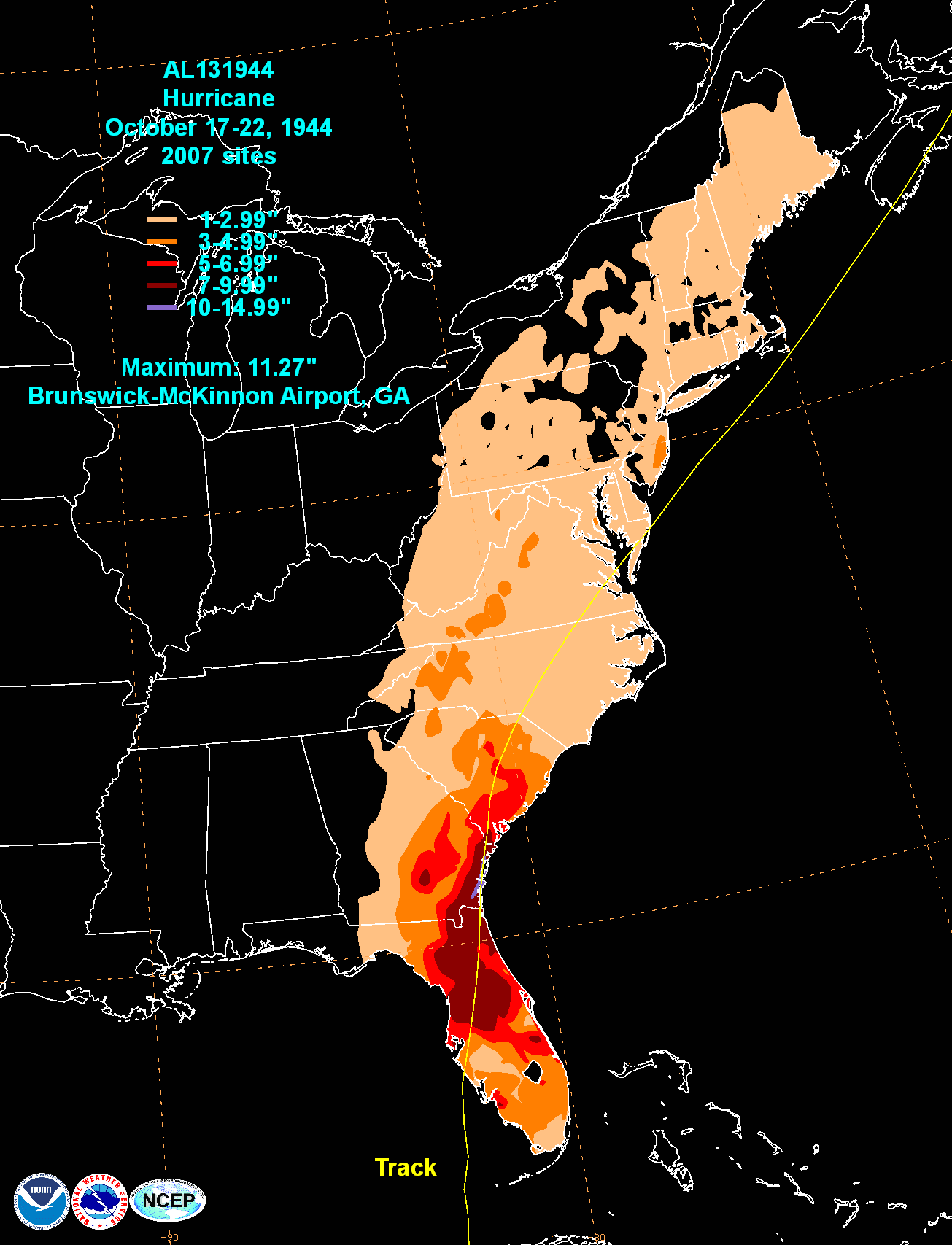
Rainfall totals associated with the hurricane across the United States

Gale-force winds affected the entire Florida peninsula, the westward extent of the strong winds reaching Tallahassee. Wind-field analyses later demonstrated that winds of at least 50 mph (80 km/h) spanned an area with a diameter of 300 mi (480 km). The strongest winds were focused within a 30 mi (48 km)-wide region east of the storm's center and penetrated far inland, with sustained winds of 82 mph (132 km/h) and a gust of 108 mph (174 km/h) reported in Orlando. These winds occurred over the state's core citrus-producing areas—De Soto, Hardee, Lake, Orange, Polk, and Sarasota counties—resulting in the loss of approximately 25 million boxes of fruit. Damage to Florida's citrus crop was estimated at $20 million, with an expected cut of $50 million to the state's annual citrus profits. As late as a week before the hurricane's arrival, 1944 had been expected to be the best year for Florida citrus production in history. Citrus losses extended beyond the core regions, with significant losses in Seminole and Osceola counties. The grapefruit harvest saw a 40 percent loss while the early- and mid-season orange harvest saw a 15–20 percent loss. Rainfall-related damage, primarily to tomatoes, cabbage, beans, and peppers, collectively resulted in a 75 percent loss of crops in the Hollywood area.

Of Florida's interior cities, Orlando saw the most severe damage, amounting to several million dollars. While reports of severe property damage were relatively infrequent, damage to ancillary structures and roofs was widespread. Approximately 600–800 homes and numerous stores were damaged. The hurricane disrupted most communications in Orlando and surrounding communities outside of downtown; only two cables linking the city with Jacksonville remained in service. Felled trees blocked a third of the city streets. Orlando recorded its rainiest 24-hour period since 1910, observing 7.49 in (190 mm) between October 18–19. Damage across Orange County was preliminarily estimated between $3–5 million, the damage in Orlando accounting for roughly half of the toll. One person was electrocuted in the downtown area. The Orlando Reporter-Star called the hurricane the Orlando's worst storm in 50 years. At nearby Winter Park, power failures caused the municipal water system to shut down. Many homes in Gotha were roofless from the storm's winds. Between Gotha and Windermere, more than half of the grapefruit trees were stripped of their fruits, as well as 10–20 percent of orange trees and five percent of tangerines.

Elsewhere in the Florida interior, two hangars at Alachua Army Air Field near Gainesville collapsed. Some trees in Gainesville were toppled onto houses. Severe property damage was noted in Bartow, and roofs were torn from a school and several homes in Williston and Groveland. Damage was limited primarily to crops in the Palatka and Crescent City areas, with only minor losses sustained otherwise. Heavy rains and gusts as high as 75 mph (121 km/h) were recorded in Lakeland, which lost all power during the storm.

=== Elsewhere in the United States ===
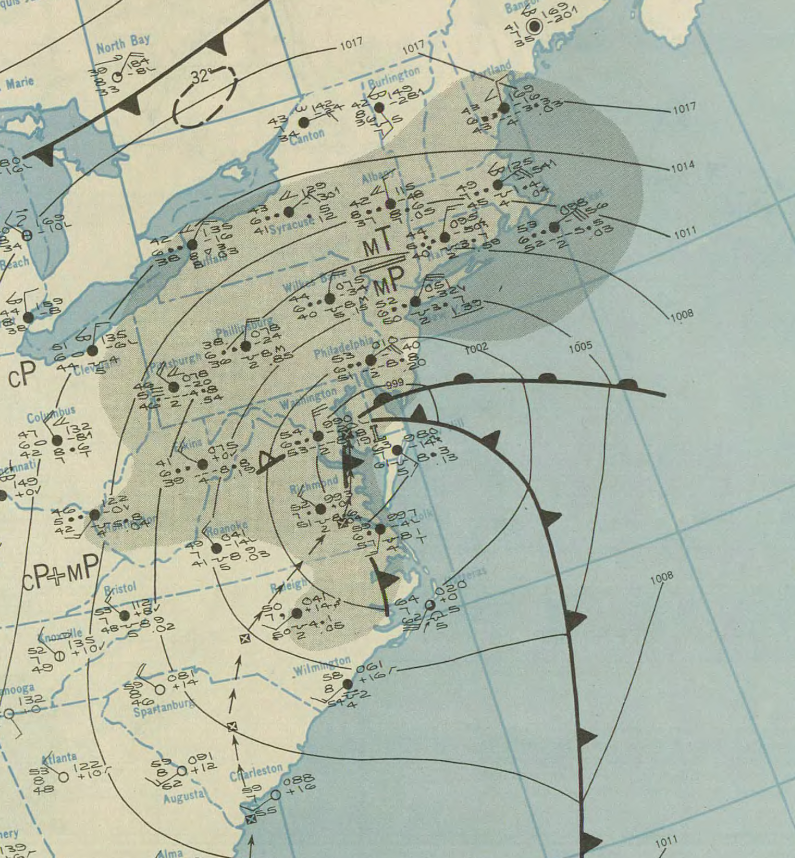
Map of the hurricane's remnants over Chesapeake Bay on October 21

Total losses in the state of Georgia were estimated at between $250,000–$500,000. Most of the damage occurred before the arrival of the storm's center of circulation. Downed trees blocked streets and highways in several communities. Communication services were scant in some areas as telecommunication and power lines were severed by the storm. Strong winds also damaged the shingles of some buildings to varying degrees. The shipyard in Brunswick, Georgia, was hit particularly hard, several of its buildings and four cranes being damaged. Eastern extents of the city were also inundated by storm surge as far as 1 mi (1.6 km) inland, prompting the evacuation of affected homes. The high wind-swept tides caused coastal inundation throughout the Southeastern U.S. coast, destroying many fishing boats at the Port of Savannah. The highest tides in Georgia occurred in Fort Pulaski, where the sea rose 5.9 ft (1.8 m) above mean sea level. Water damage on the island of St. Simons forced the evacuation of 1,200 people. The hurricane's heaviest rainfall occurred at the Brunswick airport, where 11.4 in (290 mm) was recorded.

Winds reaching 65 mph (105 km/h) brought down power and communication lines across the Carolinas, leaving much of Charleston, South Carolina, without electricity. Tides to 9 ft (2.7 m) inundated low-lying areas of the city, primarily around The Battery. Trees and signage were downed in Florence, located 70 mi (110 km) from the coast. Several railroad coaches traversing the Atlantic Coast Line Railroad just south of Florence were damaged. Heavy rains throughout South Carolina caused $350,000 in damage to property and crops. In northwestern parts of the state, unpicked cotton crops perished. Winds of 30–40 mph (48–64 km/h) damaged corn and lespedeza in North Carolina, constituting most of the $200,000 damage toll wrought by the storm there.

The storm's effects tapered as precipitation and high seas spread north along the U.S. East Coast. Widespread rains were reported throughout Virginia. Some flooding occurred around Staunton, blocking some minor roads. High winds downed as many as 30 percent of unharvested apples. Greater Norfolk endured 35 mph (56 km/h) winds and a 2 ft (0.61 m) storm surge. In Newport News, the elevated seas rose over the seawall, inundating low-lying areas. A Weather Bureau meteorologist characterized the storm's effects in Maryland as "an old-fashioned nor'easter". Minor telecommunication disruptions were reported in Maryland by the Chesapeake and Potomac Telephone Company. Debris buildup in Baltimore blocked some sewage pipes. Rough surf topped bulkheads damaged by the 1944 Great Atlantic hurricane along the coast of North Jersey, flooding oceanside streets. Similar coastal flooding occurred along the barrier island, Long Beach Island, farther south. Strong winds blew out some windows in the Philadelphia, Pennsylvania, region. Gusts of 50 mph (80 km/h) grounded airplane traffic and yachts in New England. An empty coal barge was grounded upon Thompson Island, carried by wind-driven seas. One driver in Somersworth, New Hampshire, was killed after losing control of their car on a slick roadway—three passengers were injured. Downed wires in Newton and Quincy, Massachusetts, cut power to roughly 250 homes.

== Aftermath ==
Costliest U.S. Atlantic hurricanes, 1900–2017 Direct economic losses, normalized to societal conditions in 2018
Rank	Hurricane	Season	Cost
1	4 "Miami"	1926	$235.9 billion
2	4 "Galveston"	1900	$138.6 billion
3	3 Katrina	2005	$116.9 billion
4	4 "Galveston"	1915	$109.8 billion
5	5 Andrew	1992	$106.0 billion
6	ET Sandy	2012	$73.5 billion
7	3 "Cuba–Florida"	1944	$73.5 billion
8	4 Harvey	2017	$62.2 billion
9	3 "New England"	1938	$57.8 billion
10	4 "Okeechobee"	1928	$54.4 billion
Main article: List of costliest Atlantic hurricanes

The Daily Gleaner, the Jamaican newspaper, coordinated with the Jamaican Central Storm Relief Committee to organize a storm relief fund for the Cayman Islands. The United States initiated relief operations in Cuba, focusing on augmenting food supplies. A Pan-American Clipper with American government officials onboard was dispatched to survey isolated areas of Cuba, including Pinar del Río. President of Cuba Ramón Grau visited hospitals after the storm's passage to aid relief efforts.

In the immediate aftermath, between 5,000 and 7,000 people across Florida were displaced and housed in temporary arrangements; three times as many people required dietary assistance. The city of Orlando coordinated with the Army Air Forces Tactical Center in debris cleanup operations. Assistance was also provided by line crews from Alabama and Georgia to restore power to the city. In response to the widespread citrus losses, the president of Gentile Bros. Co., a company with significant citrus operations in Florida, petitioned the Florida Citrus Commission to raise ceiling prices on citrus fruits sourced from the state. On behalf of citrus interests, U.S. Senator Claude Pepper of Florida wrote letters to the Office of Price Administration (OPA), the War Food Administration (WFA), and the War Production Board (WPB), requesting their assistance in surveying the damage and to consider both the price ceilings on citrus and restrictions on tin usage; relaxing tin restrictions would allow the salvaging of wind-torn fruits by canning them as juices. Pepper also asked the agencies to consider the price ceilings for vegetables. The Texas Agriculture Commissioner, James E. McDonald, asked Texas citrus growers to suspend shipments to allow Florida citrus growers to recover, echoing a similar gesture from Florida citrus growers following a hurricane in 1933. Officials from the OPA and WFA convened in Lakeland, Florida, on October 27 to discuss the calls to increase ceiling prices for citrus; Florida citrus growers contended that the U.S. Department of Agriculture's monthly crop report for October did not accurately reflect the losses caused by the hurricane and sent a delegation to raise the matter in Washington, D.C. in November. A temporary increase in ceiling prices on citrus fruits was eventually implemented for the state of Florida.

The WPB, operating jointly with the Red Cross, made 5,000,000 ft (1,500,000 m) of lumber and 5,000 shingle squares available for repairs and in the Tampa area. The Federal Housing Administration allowed mortgage loans of $5,400 for residents whose homes were destroyed by the hurricane, based on the agency's assessment that "property damage was limited to roofs and broken glass" in the state.

== See also ==
- List of Florida hurricanes (1900–1949)
- 1910 Cuba hurricane – caused extensive damage in western Cuba before affecting much of Florida
- Hurricane Charley – took a similar path through Cuba and Florida, with a significant core of wind damage spanning central Florida
