= John Drayton Pitts =

American politician and businessman (1798–1861)

Member of the Georgia House of Representatives
- In office 1841–?

Adjutant General of Texas
- In office March 4, 1848 – 1849
- Governor: George Tyler Wood; Peter Hansborough Bell
- Preceded by: Charles L. Mann
- Succeeded by: James Shackleford Gillett

Personal details
- Born: August 26, 1798 Atlantic Ocean
- Died: February 5, 1861 (aged 62)
- Relations: Edward R. Kone (grandson)
- Occupation: Politician, businessman

John Drayton Pitts (August 26, 1798 – February 5, 1861) was an American politician and businessman. He served as Adjutant General of Texas from 1848 to 1849 and founded multiple settlements in Texas.

== Biography ==
Pitts was born on August 26, 1798, to captain John Pitts and Jane (née Ingram) Pitts. He was born at sea in the Atlantic Ocean, aboard a ship sailing from England to Charleston, South Carolina. He lived in Charleston prior to the War of 1812, at which he moved to Georgia.

As a young adult, Pitts lived in Stewart County, Georgia. He served as its justice of the peace and as an trustee of local education. He also worked as a civil engineer, as which he oversaw the construction of a bridge crossing the Chattahoochee River. He was a founder of the settlement of Florence. In 1841, he was elected to the Georgia House of Representatives.

In 1842, Pitts and family moved to the Republic of Texas. He settled in Austin County and is believed to have been its first farmer. He later moved to Grimes County. In 1842, invited eleven other families to move to the country. He worked as a clerk for the Texas House of Representatives in the late 1840s. He was appointed Adjutant General of Texas by Governor George Tyler Wood, serving from March 4, 1848, to 1849. He was a founder of San Marcos and served on the inaugural jury of its district court. He also founded the settlement of Blanco, with James Hughes Callahan under the Pittsburg Land Company. A slaveowner, he owned fifteen people and was a delegate of the 1861 state convention discussing secession.

In 1850, Pitts established a Methodist Episcopal church in San Marcos, on land he purchased from Edward Burleson. He was also a Freemason and helped establish the first Masonic Lodge in Hays County. On April 1, 1819, he married Eliza Permelia Daves. She died on May 12, 1851, then in 1852, he married Ann Durham. He died on February 5, 1861, aged 62, and is buried in Pitts Cemetery. His grandson was lawyer and politician Edward R. Kone. On November 11, 1995, his family cemetery was named a Recorded Texas Historic Landmark.
