= Edward L. Blackshear =

American educator (1862–1919)

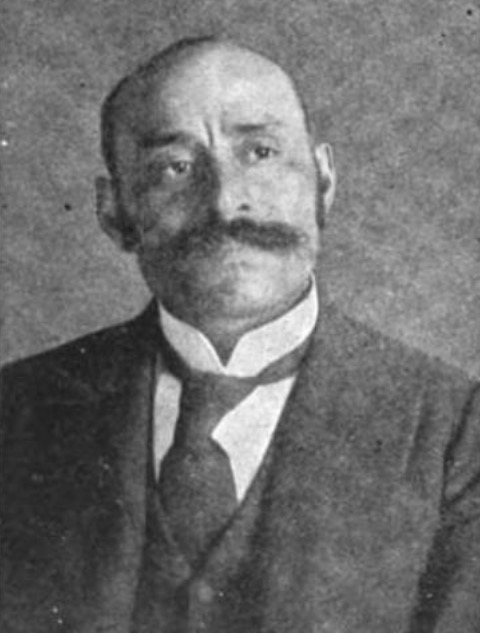
- Blackshear in a 1902 publication

Principal of Prairie View A&M University
- In office August 1896 – June 12, 1915
- Appointed by: Charles A. Culberson
- Preceded by: L. C. Anderson
- Succeeded by: Isaiah Milligan Terrell

Personal details
- Born: Edward Lavoisier Blackshear; September 8, 1862 Montgomery, Alabama, US
- Died: December 12, 1919 (aged 57)
- Party: Republican
- Education: Tabor College; Wilberforce University
- Occupation: Educator

Edward Lavoisier Blackshear (erroneously Levoisier or Levoscer; September 8, 1862 – December 12, 1919) was an American educator. He was principal of Prairie View A&M University.

Born into slavery in Alabama, Blackshear studied at Tabor College, afterwards becoming an educator. He was principal of Prairie View A&M University from 1896 to 1915, being removed from his position by the Governor in the midst of his tenure. He also headed black agricultural organizations in Texas.

== Early life and education ==
Blackshear was born into slavery on September 8, 1862, in Montgomery, Alabama, the son of Adlene Pollard and Abram Vandiver. He had many siblings, though only three reached adulthood. His mother was a house slave, and as a result, he became literate as a child. He later attended Montgomery's first black public school, followed by Swayne College.

In 1875, Blackshear entered Tabor College, earning either his Bachelor of Arts or Bachelor of Science from there, in June 1881. In 1902, he earned a Master of Arts from Tabor, as well as a Doctor of Laws from Wilberforce University.

== Career ==
After graduating, Blackshear returned to Alabama. He moved to Texas in 1882 after encouragement from his friend, educator H. T. Kealing. He settled Ellis County, then in Bastrop County, teaching in both. He later moved to Waco, where he and Kealing both worked as educators. Also in 1882, he worked as a telegraph installer for the Texas Midland Railroad in order to recover from poor health. After recovering, he became an educator at Paul Quinn College, leaving in early 1883 to teach at the Eighth Ward School in Fort Worth.

In fall of the same year, Blackshear became principal of a school in Wheatville, Austin, in May 1884, became principal of a Goliad school for black educators, in 1888, became principal of the Central Grammar School, and in 1892, became superintendent of Austin black schools.

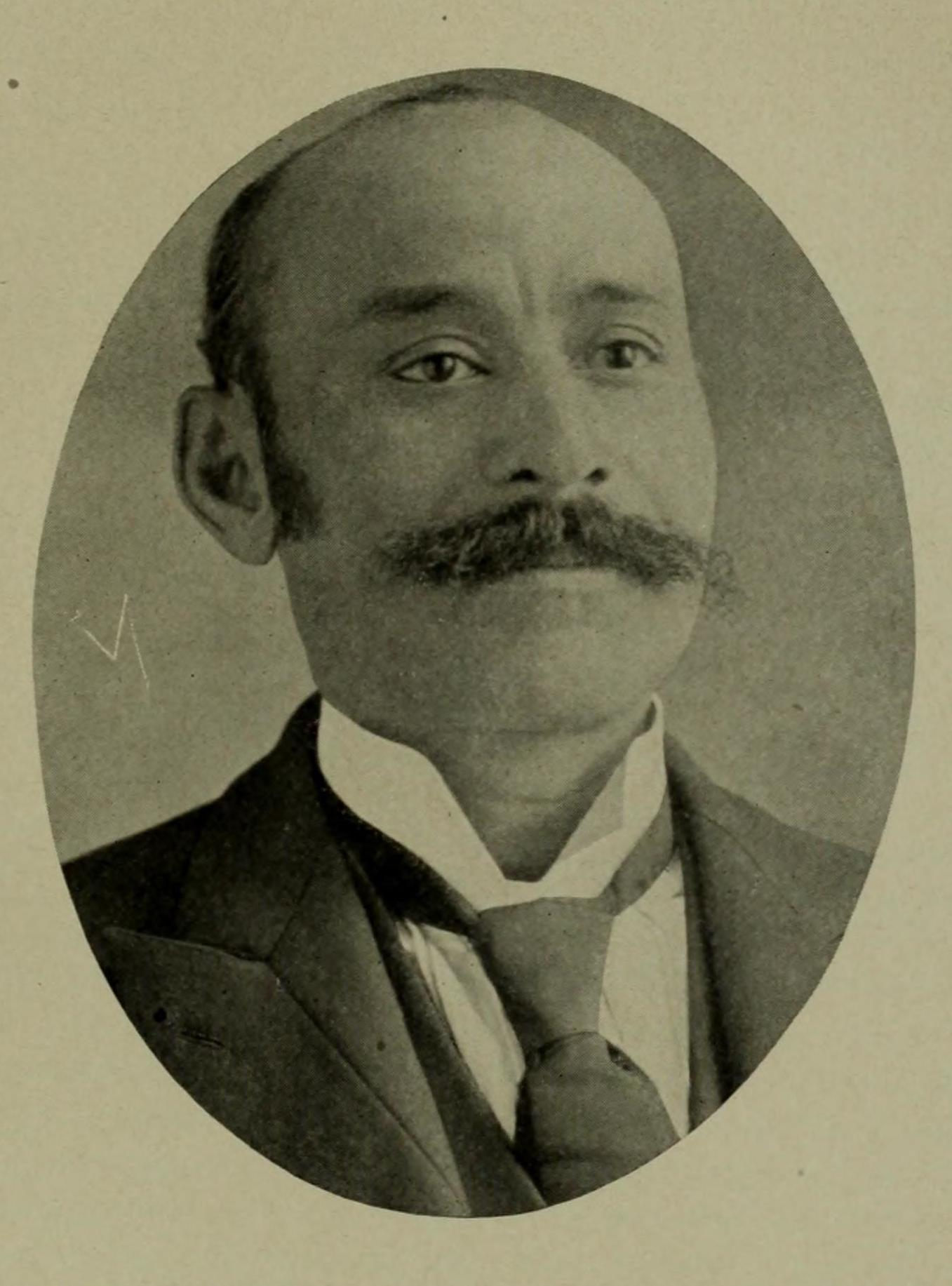
Blackshear in a 1902 publication

In August 1896, Blackshear was appointed the third principal of the Prairie View State Normal and Industrial College, by Governor Charles A. Culberson. As principal, he helped increase the school's state funding. In 1903 and 1904, he was president of the Teachers State Association of Texas.

Blackshear was president of the Farmers' Improvement Association for some time. He founded the Negro State Farmers' Congress of Texas, serving as its president for several years. In 1913, he became president of the National Negro Farmers' Congress, in Birmingham, Alabama. He worked to support black farmers, as opposed to Texas Agriculture Commissioner Edward R. Kone. By March 1919, he was an agricultural extension field agent.

Blackshear was a prohibitionist Republican. In 1914, he supported Thomas H. Ball for Texas Governor. The eventual Governor, James E. Ferguson, had Blackshear removed as principal in 1915. He was reappointed president by the board of directors, serving from 1915, until his resignation June 12 of the same year. He requested to return to the position, but the board of directors declined in early August. Later in 1915, he led an extension of the Kansas, Louisiana and Oklahoma Railway.

== Personal life, death, and legacy ==
Blackshear married a woman who predeceased him. On March 12, 1891, he remarried to Rachel Verta Works, with whom he had three children. He lived in Prairie View. He was Baptist, having converted while at Tabor University. He was a member of the Freemasons, the Knights of Pythias, and the Independent Order of Odd Fellows. He died on December 12, 1919, aged 57, and was buried in Hempstead.

In 1936, Gregorytown School in Austin was renamed Blackshear School. In 1948, the Edward L. Blackshear Field, in Prairie View, was also named for him. Prairie View A&M University established the Edward L. Blackshear Scholarship in his honor. An archive of his papers is held by Prairie View A&M University. In 1987, he was inducted into the Prairie View A&M University Sports Hall Of Fame.
