= I. M. Terrell =

American educator (1859–1931)

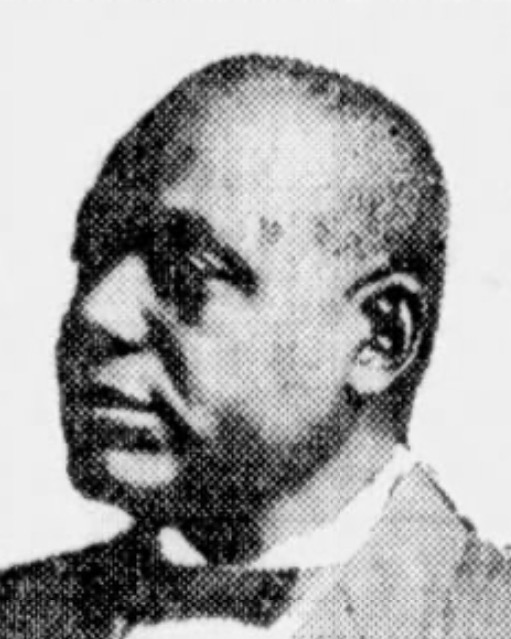

Principal of Prairie View A&M University
- In office October 15, 1915 – 1918
- Preceded by: Edward L. Blackshear
- Succeeded by: John Granville Osborne

Personal details
- Born: Isaiah Milligan Terrell; January 3, 1859 Anderson, Texas, US
- Died: September 28, 1931 (aged 72) Houston, Texas, US
- Education: Straight University
- Occupation: Educator

Isaiah Milligan Terrell (January 3, 1859 – September 28, 1931) was an American educator. He was Principal of Prairie View A&M University from 1915 to 1918. He also served as president of Houston Baptist Academy and as superintendent of the Houston Negro Hospital.

== Early life and education ==
Terrell was born on January 3, 1859, near Anderson, Texas, the son of blacksmith Alexander Terrell and Nancy (née Oneil) Terrell. He was educated at a private school, by two missionaries, and in 1881, graduated from Straight University, with a Bachelor of Arts. He later received a Master of Arts from the university.

== Career ==
In 1881, Terrell became a private educator in Anderson. He moved to Fort Worth in October 1882, where he was appointed by superintendent Alexander Hogg, to the East Ninth Street Colored School, the city's first black public school. He was one of four black educators in the Fort Worth public school system at the time.

In 1885, Terrell cofounded the Colored Teachers State Association of Texas. In 1890, he was made principal and superintendent of Grimes County Colored Schools. From May 1910 to 1915, he was principal of North Side Colored High School No. 11, the successor school to the East Ninth Street Colored School. In 1921, North Side Colored High School No. 11 was renamed I.M. Terrell High School, in his honor.

Terrell was principal of Prairie View A&M University from October 15, 1915 to 1918. During his tenure, the school received physical improvements. An agricultural extension program was established. His tenure also occurred during World War I. From 1918 to c. 1923, he was president of Houston Baptist Academy; he remained with the school after his tenure ended, leaving the institution in 1925. He was superintendent of Union Hospital in 1923, and from 1926 to 1928, served as the first superintendent of the Houston Negro Hospital.

== Personal life and death ==
On February 7, 1883, Terrell married music educator Marcelite Landry, with whom he had two sons. He was Baptist, as well as a member of the Independent Order of Odd Fellows. He died on September 28, 1931, aged 72, in Houston. An archive of his papers is held by Prairie View A&M University.
