= Reagan V. Brown =

American politician (1921–1999)

Reagan Veasy Brown

7th Agriculture Commissioner of Texas
- In office 1977 – January 1983
- Governor: Dolph Briscoe (1977–1979); Bill Clements (1979–1983)
- Preceded by: John C. White
- Succeeded by: Jim Hightower

Personal details
- Born: September 21, 1921 Henderson, Texas, U.S.
- Died: November 16, 1999 (aged 78) Brazos County, Texas, U.S.
- Education: Texas A&M University
- Occupation: Farmer; County extension agent

Military service
- Allegiance: United States
- Branch/service: United States Army
- Rank: Captain
- Battles/wars: World War II

Reagan Veasy Brown (September 20, 1921 – November 16, 1999) was the elected commissioner of the Texas Department of Agriculture from 1977 to 1983.

== Early years ==
He was born on September 20, 1921, he lost a finger in an accident when he was young. Brown graduated from Texas A&M University in 1943. He joined the United States Army in 1943 and served in the 69th Infantry Division in the European theatre of World War II. He was discharged from the Army in 1946 as a captain.

== Texas agriculture commissioner ==
Governor Dolph Briscoe appointed Brown to succeed longtime Agriculture Commissioner John C. White, when White resigned to serve in the Carter administration in Washington, D.C.

In 1978, Brown was elected under the new statute providing four-year terms for statewide elected officials. He was known for his fight for pest and predator control. To prevent the spread of the Mediterranean fruit fly from California to Texas in 1981, Brown required California produce to be fumigated before entering the state. Under special legislation passed during the fruit-fly crisis, the department was authorized to seize or to destroy infested products and to stop interstate and intrastate traffic to enforce the law.

Brown also worked to halt the spread of the imported fire ant. He even famously put his hand into a fire ant mound at the urging of a television reporter while news cameras rolled. However, his opponent in the 1982 Democratic primary election, the liberal journalist and commentator Jim Hightower, accused him of manufacturing the fire ant crisis to win reelection. Brown was also embarrassed when during a public speech in April 1982 he called Booker T. Washington, "That great black nigger, er, educator." (Bob Bullock by Dave McNeely. Pg. 152. 2008.) Brown would blame his slur on food poisoning. Hightower unseated Brown in a heavily Democratic year in Texas and nationally. Eight years later Hightower was himself unseated by future Governor Rick Perry.

== Lucky B Ranch ==
In 1983, Brown bought the Lucky B Ranch near Bryan, Texas. He bred bison, which were once plentiful in Texas but had since been hunted to near-extinction.

== Death ==
Brown died in a farm tractor accident at his ranch in Brazos County on November 16, 1999.

Party political offices
Preceded by John Coyle White	Democratic nominee for Agriculture Commissioner of Texas; 1978	Succeeded by Jim Hightower
Political offices
Preceded by John C. White	Texas Agriculture Commissioner; 1977–1983	Succeeded by Jim Hightower
