= George B. Terrell =

American farmer and politician

George Butler Terrell
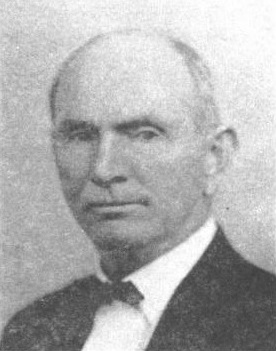

Member of the U.S. House of Representatives from Texas's at-large district
- In office March 4, 1933 – January 3, 1935
- Preceded by: Seat created
- Succeeded by: Seat inactive

Personal details
- Born: December 5, 1862 Alto, Texas, U.S.
- Died: April 18, 1947 (aged 84) Alto, Texas, U.S.
- Resting place: Old Palestine Cemetery, Alto, Texas
- Party: Democratic

George Butler Terrell (December 5, 1862 – April 18, 1947) was a U.S. representative from Texas.

== Biography ==
Terrell was born in Alto, Texas on December 5, 1862, the son of Sam Houston Terrell and Julia (Butler) Terrell. He was the grandson of George Whitfield Terrell. Terrell attended the public schools, Sam Houston Teachers' College in Huntsville, Texas, and Baylor University in Waco, Texas. Terrell became a teacher and taught school in Cherokee County, Texas from 1886 to 1903.

In 1897 and 1902, Terrell served as a member of the state teachers' examining board. In 1903, he was a member of the state textbook commission. In 1903, Terrell began farming and stock raising near Alto. A Democrat, he served in the Texas House of Representatives from 1893 to 1903 and again from 1907 to 1913 and 1917 to 1921.

Terrell was elected the state Commissioner of Agriculture in 1920, and he served until 1931. From 1931 to 1931 he served again in the state House of Representatives.

In 1932, Terrell was elected to an at-large seat in the United States House of Representatives. He served one term, March 4, 1933 to January 3, 1935. He did not run for reelection in 1934.

After leaving Congress, Terrell returned to his farm in Alto, where he resided in Alto until his death on April 18, 1947. He was interred at Old Palestine Cemetery in Alto.

== Family ==
In 1896, Terrell married Allie Minchum Turney. They were the parents of six children.

== Sources ==
- United States Congress. "George B. Terrell (id: T000129)". Biographical Directory of the United States Congress.

Party political offices
Preceded by Fred W. Davis	Democratic nominee for Agriculture Commissioner of Texas; 1920, 1922, 1924, 1926, 1928	Succeeded by James E. McDonald
U.S. House of Representatives
Preceded by Seat created	Member of the U.S. House of Representatives from Texas's at-large congressional seat 1933–1935	Succeeded by Seat inactive
