= Edward R. Kone =

American lawyer and politician (1848–1933)

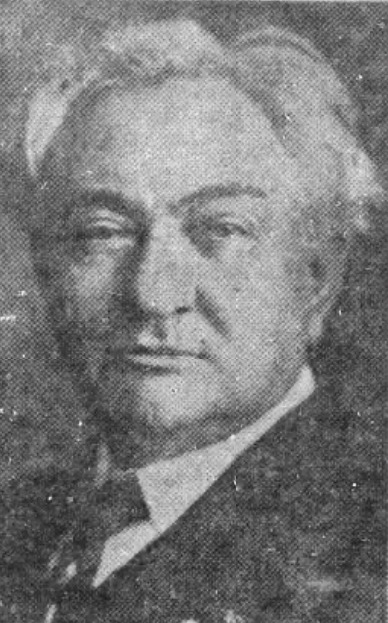
- Kone in 1926

2nd Texas Agriculture Commissioner
- In office August 1908 – 1914
- Governor: Thomas Mitchell Campbell
- Preceded by: Robert Teague Milner
- Succeeded by: Fred Davis

Personal details
- Born: Edward Reeves Kone; March 15, 1848 Montgomery County, Texas, US
- Died: January 30, 1933 (aged 84) Austin, Texas, US
- Resting place: Oakwood Cemetery
- Party: Democratic
- Relations: John Drayton Pitts (grandfather); Arthur Pope Duggan
- Occupation: Lawyer, politician

Edward Reeves Kone (March 15, 1848 – January 30, 1933) was an American lawyer and politician. A Democrat, he served as Texas Agriculture Commissioner from August 1908 to 1914.

Born in Montgomery County, Texas, Kone worked as a lawyer and served as Hays County Judge for multiple years. He was the second Texas Agriculture Commissioner, with his efforts keeping the office from termination. A conservative, he opposed Reconstruction and counteracted it by disenfranchising African Americans in Texas.

== Early life and education ==
Kone was born on March 15, 1848, in Montgomery County, Texas, the eldest of ten children born to Samuel Reid Kone and Rebecca Sylvira (née Pitts) Kone. When he was born, he weighed ten pounds and, according to the San Antonio Express-News, his father said Kone had the ugliest face that he ever saw. He was originally named Edwin. He was renamed Edward Reeves, being named for two of his uncles: a maternal uncle named Edward Pitts and a paternal uncle named Reeves Kone.

Kone was of German ancestry. His maternal grandfather was politician John Drayton Pitts. Kone's parents married in 1847. His father was a carpenter who went on to fight in the Confederate States Army during the American Civil War, dying of illness shortly after the war ended. His mother died in May 1910. He was also a distant relative of land promoter Arthur Pope Duggan.

Kone grew up on a farm in Stringtown, where his family moved to c. 1855. He attended private school in San Marcos. He then attended Bastrop Academy and attempted to join the Confederate States Army, but was not selected due to his young age. At some point, he worked as a general store clerk in San Marcos, and later as a cattle drover. He studied law at the Coronal Institute, under William Oscar Hutchison.

== Career ==
Kone was admitted to the bar in either 1869 or March 1870. He spent three years in a law partnership with Hutchison, then two years with H. B. Coffield. In 1874, he helped oust Unionist Governor Edmund J. Davis from office.

Kone served as Hays County Sheriff for eight months during the Reconstruction era. Then from 1878 to 1890, he was County Judge. During his tenure, he played a role in the construction of a new courthouse, jail, and numerous schools. He also helped Hays County pay off $30,000 in debt, which he did by having a law passed by the Texas Legislature to have the state pay 8% of the debt each year. Between 1890 and 1894, he continued his work as a lawyer, spending two of those years without a partnership, and the other two partnered with L. H. Browne. He returned to again serve as County Judge from 1894 to 1908.

Following the resignation of Robert Teague Milner as Texas Agriculture Commissioner, Kone was appointed to the office by Governor Thomas Mitchell Campbell. He served from August 1908 to 1914. During his first term, the department was threatened with termination by the state legislature if it did not operate efficiently; the department remained in operation due to Kone's efforts. As Agriculture Commissioner, he withheld information regarding cotton cultivation from black farmers. In April or May 1909, he organized a farmers' convention, for which he did not invite black farmers to; some black farmers may have attended despite not being invited. In opposition, educator Edward L. Blackshear became a Texas agriculture leader in support of black farmers.

Kone served three terms as Agriculture Commissioner, losing his re-election in 1914. From 1914 to 1920, he served as Assistant Commissioner, under successor Fred Davis. On July 1, 1926, he was appointed judge of the Austin Corporation Court, which he served as until his death. Following his death, J. W. Maxwell succeeded Kone as judge to complete his unexpired term.

=== Views ===
"We had to find some way to end the 'carpetbagger' rule, and it was the superstition of the negroes that presented us with our opprotunity. We made up for the list of disenfranchised citizens by scaring the 'darkies' away from the polls, and carried that election. I would like to emphasize that the Ku Klux Klan was started that we might have a rest from the lot who controlled the government, and when this was done we disorganized, for the Klan had served its purpose."
— Kone on organizing the Ku Klux Klan in Texas, 1926.

Kone was a member of the Democratic Party. A white supremacist, an obituary in The Austin American described him as "one of the organizers" of the Jim Crow-era Texas government. He opposed northerner leadership of Texas during Reconstruction. He helped organize the First Klan in Texas to suppress black voters and return government control to white Texans.

Within agriculture policy, Kone supported small farmers and cooperated with the Texas branch of the National Farmers Union. He also supported the conservation of Texas' natural resources.

== Personal life and death ==
Kone married Lucinda H. Martin in November 1872. They had seven children, with four surviving to adulthood, those being daughters Edna, Eula, Carolina, and Julia. He was a Methodist. He was part of several fraternities and agricultural organizations, including the Volunteer Firemen, which he served as president of for a time.

Kone died on January 30, 1933, aged 84, in Austin, from illness. He is buried at Oakwood Cemetery. Following his death, flags flew at half-mast and government buildings closed in mourning. He was commemorated by the Texas House of Representatives the same day he died, in a unanimous decision. In 1984, his house, the Kone-Cliett House, was added to the National Register of Historic Places.

Political offices
Preceded by Robert Teague Milner	Texas Agriculture Commissioner; 1908–1914	Succeeded by Fred Davis
