= Jim Hightower =

American author and liberal political activist

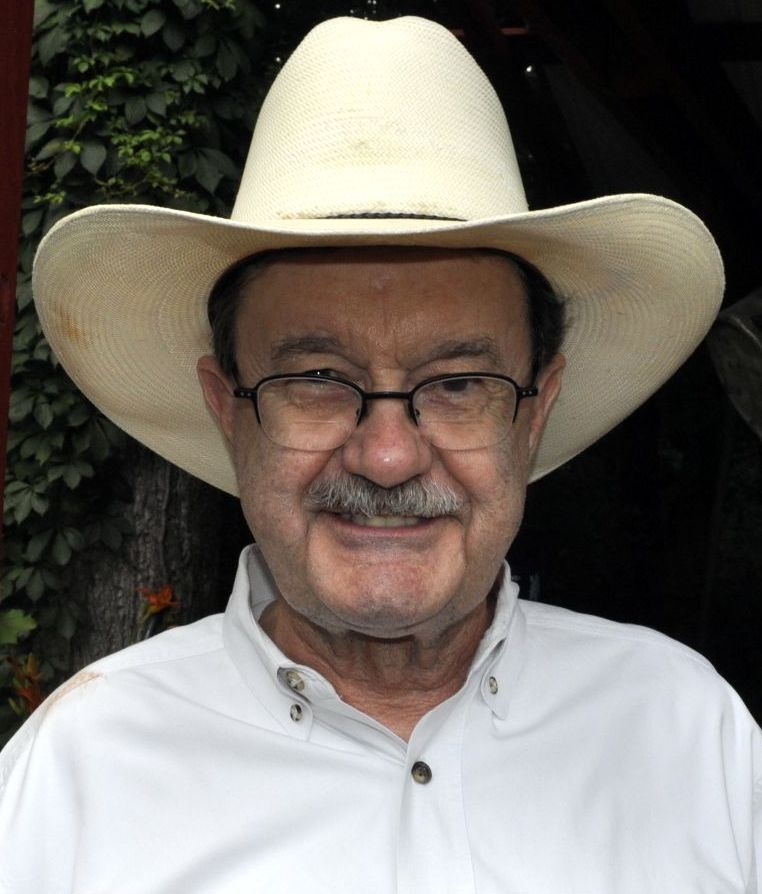
- Hightower in 2015

8th Agriculture Commissioner of Texas
- In office January 1, 1983 – January 5, 1991
- Governor: Mark White; Bill Clements
- Preceded by: Reagan V. Brown
- Succeeded by: Rick Perry

Personal details
- Born: James Allen Hightower; January 11, 1943 (age 83) Denison, Texas, U.S.
- Party: Democratic
- Education: University of North Texas; Columbia University
- Occupation: Journalist; commentator

James Allen Hightower (born January 11, 1943) is an American syndicated columnist, progressive political activist, and author.

From 1983 to 1991 he served as the elected commissioner of the Texas Department of Agriculture. Hightower was the most recent Democratic candidate elected as Agriculture Commissioner of Texas until the election of Clayton Tucker in 2026.

He publishes a monthly newsletter that is notable for its in-depth investigative reporting, The Hightower Lowdown.

== Life and career ==
Born in Denison in Grayson County in north Texas, Hightower comes from a working-class background. He worked his way through college as assistant general manager of the Denton Chamber of Commerce and later landed a spot as a management trainee for the U.S. State Department. He received a Bachelor of Arts in government from the University of North Texas in Denton, where he served as student body president. He later did graduate work at Columbia University in New York City in international affairs.

In the late 1960s, he worked in Washington, D.C., as legislative aide to U.S. Senator Ralph Yarborough. In 1970, Hightower co-founded and worked at the Agribusiness Accountability Project in Washington, D.C., which resulted in two of his early books. After managing the presidential campaign of former Senator Fred R. Harris of Oklahoma in 1976, he returned to Texas to become the editor of the magazine The Texas Observer. His first attempt at public office was an unsuccessful bid for the Democratic nomination for the Texas Railroad Commission, which regulates the oil and natural gas industries, rather than the railroads the name of the commission would seem to indicate.

In 1982, Hightower was elected Agriculture Commissioner, having unseated fellow Democrat Reagan V. Brown, who had ordered a quarantine of fruit coming into Texas from California. He served as agriculture commissioner until he was unseated in 1990 by the Democrat-turned-Republican Rick Perry, later the governor of Texas. His tenure was noted for fostering organic production, alternative crops, direct marketing by small farmers, and strong gross materials regulations. During that time, he also became a leading national spokesman for Democrats and endorsed Jesse Jackson for president in 1988. Three of Hightower's aides at the Agriculture Commission, Mike Moeller, Pete McRae, and Billie Quicksall, were convicted on bribery charges related to procuring contributions to Hightower's reelection campaign from seed dealers who were subject to the department's oversight. While Hightower was not involved in the plot, it contributed to his defeat by Perry.

During the 1992 presidential election, he supported the candidacy of U.S. Senator Tom Harkin of Iowa. After Harkin left the race, Hightower supported Jerry Brown, and cast his superdelegate vote for Governor Bill Clinton at the 1992 Democratic National Convention.

Soon after Clinton was elected, Hightower became a critic of the president. He criticized Clinton for having accepted corporate soft money contributions, his support of NAFTA, his health care plan, and his refusal to crack down on "corporate welfare", as well as what Hightower viewed as inadequate efforts at fighting unemployment and poverty.

In 2000, he joined with talk show host Phil Donahue and actress Susan Sarandon to co-chair the presidential campaign of Ralph Nader. He also appeared at Nader's "super-rallies" and stumped across the country for him.

After the disputed outcome of the 2000 election, Hightower voiced the opinion that it was Vice President Al Gore himself, who lost his home state of Tennessee, and not Ralph Nader, who caused Gore's defeat at the hands of Governor George W. Bush of Texas. Although he issued no endorsement of any candidate during the 2004 presidential primaries, he spoke and wrote approvingly of since defeated U.S. Representative Dennis Kucinich of Ohio, calling him a "clear populist with a lifelong history of unambiguous advocacy of populist principles." Once Senator John Kerry of Massachusetts won the nomination, Hightower endorsed him and urged fellow progressives to work for his election, saying, "I don't care if he's a sack of cement, we're going to carry him to victory." During this election, he also campaigned in support of the U.S. Senate bid of Doris "Granny D" Haddock, a friend and fellow activist who was running as a Democrat against incumbent Republican Senator Judd Gregg of New Hampshire.

Since 1993, Hightower has produced Hightower Radio, a daily two-minute commentary carried by over 130 affiliates. He also hosted a weekend talk show on the American Broadcasting Company radio network and a weekday midday talk show on the United Broadcasting Network (later called America Radio Network). Hightower's Chat & Chew aired in thirty-eight markets around the United States. Floyd Domino was his music director and co-host.

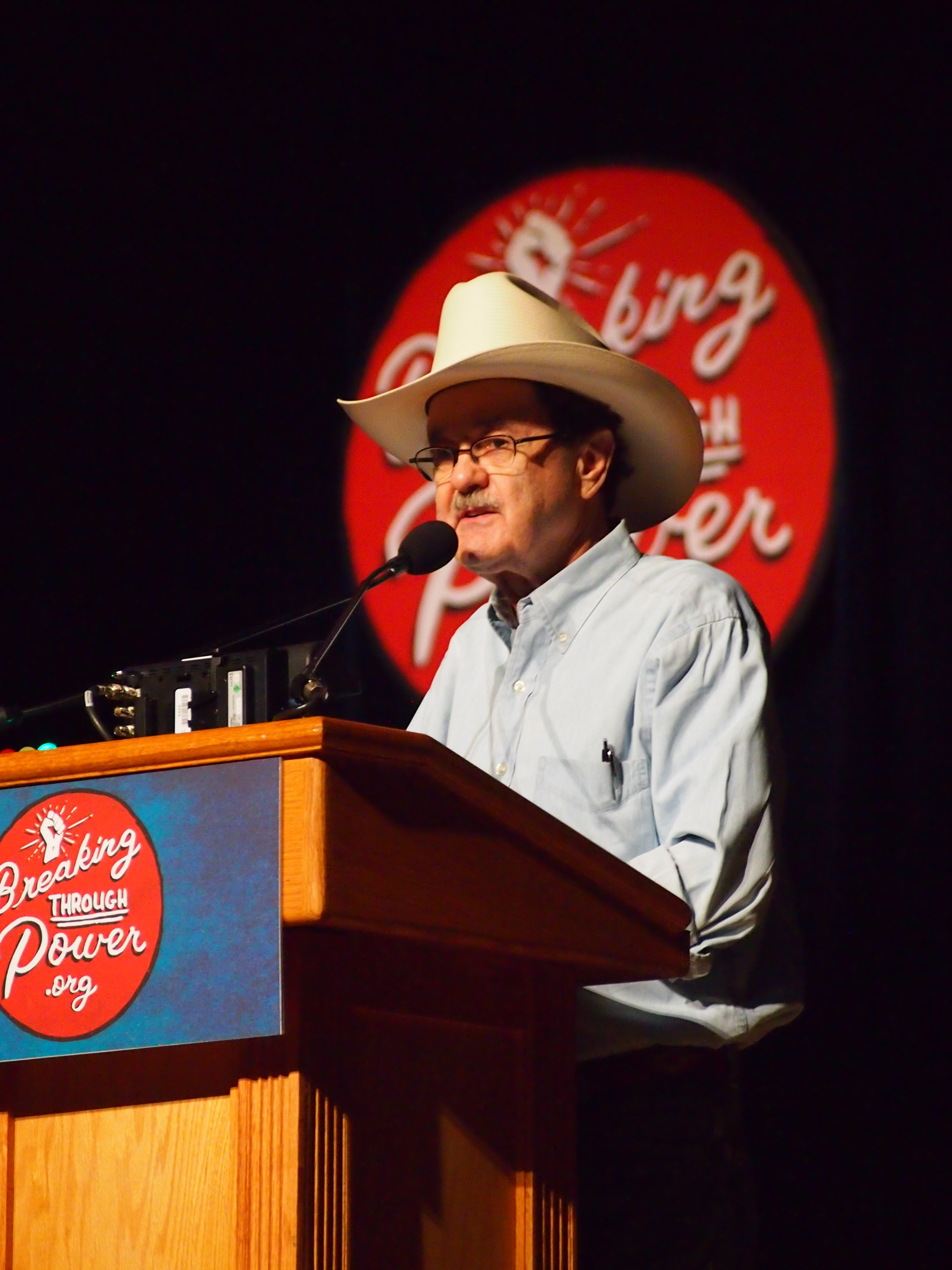
Hightower speaking in 2016

In recent years, Hightower has advocated for industrial hemp as a sustainable agricultural crop.

Hightower endorsed Bernie Sanders for president in 2016, actively campaigning for the Democratic candidate. In summer 2016, after Hillary Clinton won the party's nomination, Sanders supporters formed the progressive group Our Revolution, and Hightower joined the board of directors. Despite the Democratic party losing both houses of Congress in the United States, Hightower talked of his optimism toward a greater progressive revolution after meeting with Sanders. Hightower cited the large number of progressive initiatives passed to counter the idea that Donald Trump and right-wing populism were supplanting progressive ideals. In addition to being on the national board of Our Revolution, Hightower has been working with Our Revolution Texas.

=== Syndicated column ===
Hightower writes a nationally syndicated column carried by seventy-five independent weekly newspapers and other publications through Creators Syndicate. He also writes for The Progressive Populist.

=== The Hightower Lowdown ===
Hightower writes a monthly newsletter, The Hightower Lowdown, which has more than 135,000 subscribers. The newsletter is notable for its in-depth investigative reporting and criticism of George W. Bush's administration, which Hightower claimed was beholden to corporations and extremist conservatives. It has received both the Alternative Press Award and the Independent Press Association Award for best national newsletter.

In January, 2022, Hightower noted his support for the Rights of Nature movement. After reviewing some history of the movement, he declared that the initiative to put a state constitutional amendment on the 2024 ballot for voters to consider, has made Florida "the epicenter" of today's Rights of Nature movement in the United States.

=== Doug Jones Average ===
The "Doug Jones Average", a concept created by Jim Hightower, is the proposal that in order to check the true health of the American economy, it is less useful to look at the Dow Jones Industrial Average than it is to check up on how the average worker down the street (Doug Jones) is doing. If Doug Jones is on welfare, cannot feed his family, is blowing his savings, and is three weeks behind on his bills, the Doug Jones average is "down". If Doug just got a raise, can pay his bills and Doug and his family are looking into owning a nice but not too expensive house, the Doug Jones average is "up".

=== Awards and honors ===
- Eugene V. Debs Award (1995)
- Humanist Pioneer Award (2002)
- Puffin/Nation Prize for Creative Citizenship (2009)

== Books ==
External videos
- Booknotes interview with Hightower on There's Nothing in the Middle of the Road But Yellow Stripes and Dead Armadillos, December 21, 1997, C-SPAN

- Hard Tomatoes, Hard Times: A Report of the Agribusiness Accountability Project on the Failure of America's Land Grant College Complex (1972)
- Eat Your Heart Out: Food Profiteering in America (1975)
- There's Nothing in the Middle of the Road but Yellow Stripes and Dead Armadillos (1997; ISBN 0-06-092949-9)
- If the Gods Had Meant Us to Vote, They'd Have Given Us Candidates (2001; ISBN 0-06-093209-0)
- Thieves in High Places: They've Stolen Our Country—And It's Time to Take It Back (2003; ISBN 0-670-03141-0)
- Let's Stop Beating Around the Bush (2004; ISBN 0-670-03354-5)
- Swim against the Current: Even a Dead Fish Can Go With the Flow (2008; ISBN 0-470-12151-3)

== Archives ==
The official Jim Hightower Archive is at the Wittliff collections of Southwestern Writers, Texas State University, San Marcos, Texas.

== See also ==
- 21st Century Democrats

Party political offices
Preceded by Reagan V. Brown	Democratic nominee for Agriculture Commissioner of Texas; 1982, 1986, 1990	Succeeded by Marvin Gregory
Political offices
Preceded by Reagan V. Brown	Texas Agriculture Commissioner; 1983–1991	Succeeded by Rick Perry
