= Robert Teague Milner =

American politician and academic administrator (1851–1923)

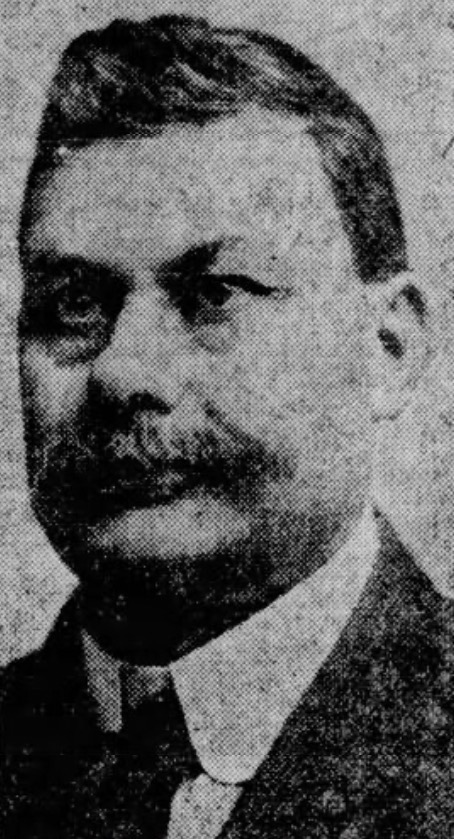

Speaker of the Texas House of Representatives
- In office January 13, 1891 – January 10, 1893
- Preceded by: Frank P. Alexander
- Succeeded by: John Hughes Cochran

Member of the Texas House of Representatives from the 6th district
- In office January 11, 1887 – January 10, 1893
- Preceded by: W. J. Clay
- Succeeded by: E. W. Fagan

Texas Insurance Commissioner
- In office 1906 – September 1, 1907
- Preceded by: William Beard
- Succeeded by: E. W. Fagan

1st Texas Agriculture Commissioner
- In office 1907–1908
- Preceded by: Position established
- Succeeded by: Edward R. Kone

President of Texas A&M University
- In office September 1, 1908 – October 1, 1913
- Preceded by: Henry Hill Harrington
- Succeeded by: Charles Puryear

Personal details
- Born: June 21, 1851 Cherokee County, Alabama, US
- Died: July 30, 1923 (aged 72) Henderson, Texas, US
- Party: Democratic Party
- Occupation: Politician, academic administrator

Robert Teague Milner Sr. (June 21, 1851 – July 30, 1923) was an American politician and academic administrator. A Democrat, he held numerous Texas statewide offices, including Speaker of the House, Insurance Commissioner, and Agriculture Commissioner. He was also President of Texas A&M University.

== Early life and education ==
Milner was born on June 21, 1851, in Cherokee County, Alabama, to Arnold Milner and Mary Milner. He grew up in Pine Hill, Texas, attending public school there and later studying at the Henderson Male and Female College.

== Career and later life ==
Between c. 1866 and 1881, Milner worked as an educator. He purchased The Henderson Times, a local newspaper, in 1881, and he operated and edited it from then until 1906.

Milner was a member of the Democratic Party. He represented the 6th district in the Texas House of Representatives from January 11, 1887, to January 10, 1893, serving as Speaker from January 13, 1891, to January 10, 1893. As Chairman of the House Committee on Public Education during his tenure, he worked to improve Texas education policy, such as when he drafted and introduced a bill to include Texas history in public curriculum. He was also chairman of the Committee on Public Printing and was a member of the Committees on Constitutional Amendments, Engrossed Bills, Fish and Game Laws, General Education Bill, Internal Improvements, and Rules.

Milner was appointed Commissioner of the state Departments of Agriculture and Insurance by Governor Thomas Mitchell Campbell. He served as Insurance Commissioner from 1906 to September 1, 1907, then served as Agriculture Commissioner from 1907 to 1908. He had requested the creation of the Department of Agriculture to Campbell, assuming the office as its inaugural Commissioner following its creation.

In 1908, Milner resigned as Agriculture Commissioner and was succeeded by Edward R. Kone. Afterward, he served as President of Texas A&M University from September 1, 1908, to October 1, 1913.

Milner resigned as President of Texas A&M on October 1, 1913, after which he retired to Henderson. He had five children with his wife, Mary L. Hawkins, who he married in October 1883. He died on July 20, 1923, aged 72, in Henderson, and is buried in the Old Henderson City Cemetery.

Texas House of Representatives
Preceded by William Beard	Member of the Texas House of Representatives from the 6th district 1887–1893	Succeeded by E. W. Fagan
Political offices
Preceded by Frank P. Alexander	Speaker of the Texas House of Representatives; 1891–1893	Succeeded by John Hughes Cochran
New office	Agriculture Commissioner of Texas; 1907–1908	Succeeded by Edward R. Kone
