= Texas Department of Insurance =

Regulatory agency in Texas

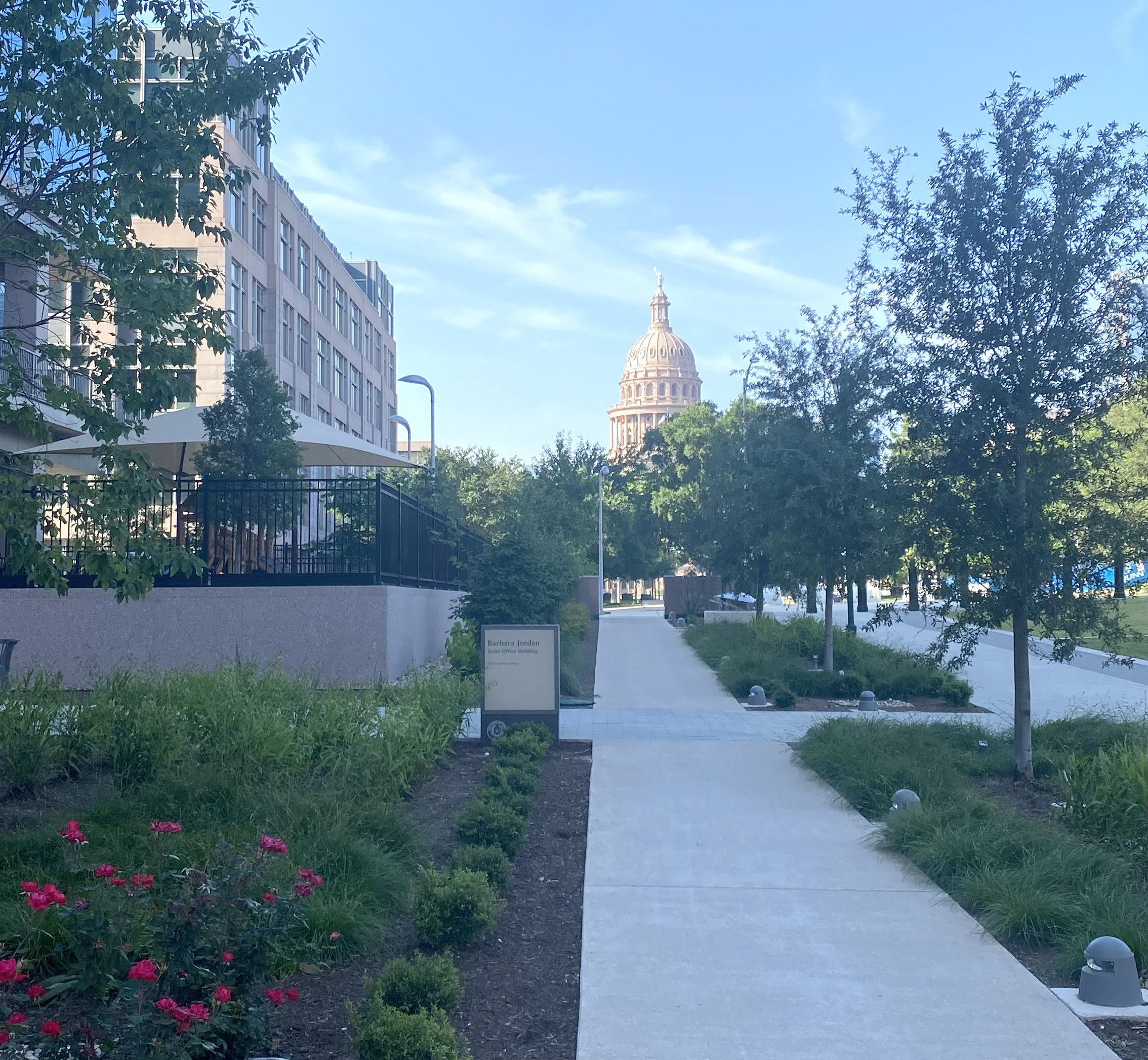
The Barbara Jordan Building's entrance is off of the Texas Capitol Mall, a newly designed pedestrian space.

The Texas Department of Insurance (TDI) regulates insurers and other companies that conduct insurance business in Texas, and assists Texas-based insurance consumers. TDI was founded in 1876 as the Department of Insurance, Statistics and History.

The agency is responsible of enforcing the Texas Insurance Code; to regulate the insurance business, protect consumers, ensure fair competition among companies, and foster the stability of insurance market. In addition to administering the Texas workers' compensation system according to the Texas Labor Code, performing the duties of the State Fire Marshal's Office, and providing administrative support to the Office of Injured Employee Counsel.

Continuing education for insurance professionals is regulated by each state's Department for Insurance, although there are commonalties across the states. See Insurance Continuing Education.

In 2022, TDI moved from the William P. Hobby Jr. Building in downtown Austin to the Barbara Jordan State Office Building north of the Texas Capitol. The agency is now headquartered at 1601 Congress Avenue in Austin, Texas. It has around 1,400 employees statewide and a $110 million annual budget.

The commissioner of insurance serves as the chief executive and administrative officer of the department.

== History ==
=== 1876-1907 ===
On August 21, 1876, the state legislature passed a law to establish the Texas Insurance Department as the first agency for insurance supervision in the state and the authorization of the Board of Insurance Commissioners went effective on April 18. At first the agency worked under the state comptroller of public accounts, one year later the operations were folded into working under the commissioner of insurance, statistics, and history under the Department of Insurance, Statistics and History.

List of commissioners of insurance, statistics, and history from 1876 to 1907:

Name	Term
V. O. King	Sept. 1 1876 - Jan. 26, 1881
A. W. Spaight	Jan 25, 1881 - 1883
H. P. Brewster	Jan. 31, 1883 - Dec. 26, 1884
Hamilton P. Bee	Dec. 30 1884 - Jan. 21, 1887
L. L. Foster	January 20, 1887 - May 5, 1891
John Elston Hollingsworth	1891 - Jan. 10, 1895
A. J. Rose	1895 - August 1897
Jefferson Johnson	1897 - August 1901
W. J. Clay	1901 - August 1906
Robert Teague Milner	1906 - September 1, 1907

=== 1907-1927 ===
The state's legislature of 1907 separated the insurance department from the other departments and included the operations of banking regulation, and the commissioner's title changed to Commissioner of Insurance and Banking, served a 2-year term. In 1913 the State Insurance Commission was introduced. The first Commissioner of Insurance and Bank was Thomas B. Love and was succeeded by William E. Hawkins.

=== 1927-1957 ===
In 1927 the Board of Insurance Commissioners was re-established to include three members appointed by the governor for a six-year term.

=== 1957-1995 ===
In 1957, the Board of Insurance Commissioners was abolished and replaced by the State Board of Insurance, consisted of three members appointed by the governor but serving a six-year term. The board determined policy and rates and authorized rules, while the commissioner was responsible for administrative operations and was appointed by the board. The primary functions of the agency included licensing domestic and out-of-state insurance companies and regular monitoring of its practices and rates.

=== 1995-1999 ===
In early nineties the agency witnessed significant changes started with 145 orders issued in 1991 following state's legislature, the changes included various revisions of the laws and targeted reforms in the Medicare supplement insurance and rating practices. By 1994, the three-member board was abolished and replaced with the Department of Insurance headed by one commissioner appointed by the governor and approved by the Senate, some of the duties of the department were deported to other state agencies; the State Office of Administrative Hearings took over hearings, the Comptroller's Offices over tax operations, and the Texas Workers' Compensation Commission handled the compensation data of workers.

=== 1999-Present ===
On September 1, 2005, the state's 79th Legislature took effect transferring the operations of the Texas Workers' Compensation Commission to the Texas Department of Insurance and creating a separate division.

== Commissioner of Insurance ==
The Texas Commissioner of Insurance serves as the chief executive and administrative officer of the Department of Insurance and charged with executing all laws relating to the insurance business and overseeing all companies conducting business in the state. Cassie Brown was appointed to serve as Texas insurance commissioner by Governor Greg Abbott in September 2021. After her retirement, Governor Abbott appointed Amanda Crawford as the Commissioner of Insurance in January 2026. Crawford previously served as executive director of the Department of Information Resources and the State of Texas’ Chief Information Officer. Crawford officially stepped into the role on February 3, 2026.

== Fraud Unit ==
The Texas Department of Insurance (TDI) Fraud Unit is the state law enforcement agency responsible for enforcing laws relating to fraudulent insurance acts In the United States, insurance fraud is the second most costly white-collar crime next to tax evasion. TDI Fraud Unit criminal investigators work on a variety of cases; for example, claimant fraud, workers' compensation fraud, insurer fraud, life settlement fraud, and mortgage fraud. TDI Fraud Unit criminal investigators are licensed state of Texas peace officers, have full state police powers (armed, make arrests, and conduct investigations into violation of state laws), and have statewide jurisdiction. Fraud Unit criminal investigators specialize in financial crime and regularly conduct joint investigations with city, county, other state (DPS, Attorney General's Office), and federal law enforcement (FBI, IRS-CID, United States Postal Inspection Service, US Government OIGs, etc.), and other government agencies. Once a TDI Fraud Unit criminal investigator has completed a criminal investigation, the case is referred to a County, District and/or U.S. Attorney in order to seek indictment and prosecution. The TDI Fraud Unit employs criminal investigators, prosecutors, and crime analysts.

== In Fiction ==
The O. Henry short story "A Departmental Case" depicts a fictional Commissioner of Insurance (not Commissioner of Insurance History, and Statistics for "Statistics and history are no longer proper nouns in the government records.") named Luke Standifer, appointed in the 1880s. Commissioner Standifer, formerly a Texas Ranger, resolves problems with an insurance claim-and marital difficulties-for an old comrade-in-arms' daughter in dramatic fashion.
