= 21st Century Democrats =

American political organization

- Formation: 1986
- Dissolved: 2023
- Type: Political action committee
- Headquarters: Washington, D.C.
- Key people: Tom Harkin, Jim Hightower, Lane Evans, founders

21st Century Democrats was an American political organization founded by Senator Tom Harkin, commentator Jim Hightower and Congressman Lane Evans to help elect "progressive candidates” until its termination in 2023.

== Background ==
21st Century Democrats started out relatively small, surpassing $1 million in contributions for the first time in the 1996 election cycle. By the 2004 election cycle, according to the Political Money Line, it was the 13th largest political action committee (PAC) in the United States, raising nearly $7M. Among progressive ideological PACs, it ranked fourth behind America Coming Together, EMILY's List, and MoveOn.org. However, since 2004 its contributions gradually fell, to under $2.2M in 2010 and under $1.2M in 2014.

Unlike traditional PACs, 21st Century Democrats focused on recruiting, training, and hiring field organizers to organize grassroots campaigns on behalf of candidates for local offices, statewide office, and even targeted presidential swing states. The group had ties to Democracy for America, which grew out of Howard Dean's presidential campaign.

== Partner organizations ==
In 2009, 21st Century Democrats joined Service Employees International Union, MoveOn.org, and Daily Kos in a new effort called Accountability Now PAC. This new political action committee promised to use party primaries to challenge Democratic incumbents that PAC members do not support.

== See also ==
- Democracy for America
