= Edward L. Blackshear Field =

Multi-purpose stadium in Prairie View, Texas

Blackshear Field
- Interactive map of Blackshear Field
- Location: Prairie View, TX
- Coordinates: 30°5′28″N 95°59′40″W
- Owner: Prairie View A&M University
- Operator: Prairie View A&M University
- Capacity: 6,000
- Surface: Grass

Construction
- Opened: 1960
- Demolished: January 23, 2015

Tenant
- Prairie View A&M Panthers (NCAA) (1960–2014)

Blackshear Field was a 6,000-seat multi-purpose stadium in Prairie View, Texas, United States. It was home to the Prairie View A&M University Panthers college football team. The facility opened in 1960, and was named in honor of Edward L. Blackshear, who served as principal of the school (then known as Prairie View State Normal and Industrial College) from 1897 to 1915.

On July 23, 2010, Prairie View A&M University officials announced plans to raise money for the construction of a new 15,000-seat football stadium and athletics fieldhouse, Panther Stadium, on the footprint of Blackshear Field. On January 23, 2015, the old stadium was demolished and construction began on the complex, which opened for the 2016 football season.
