= John Coyle White =

American politician

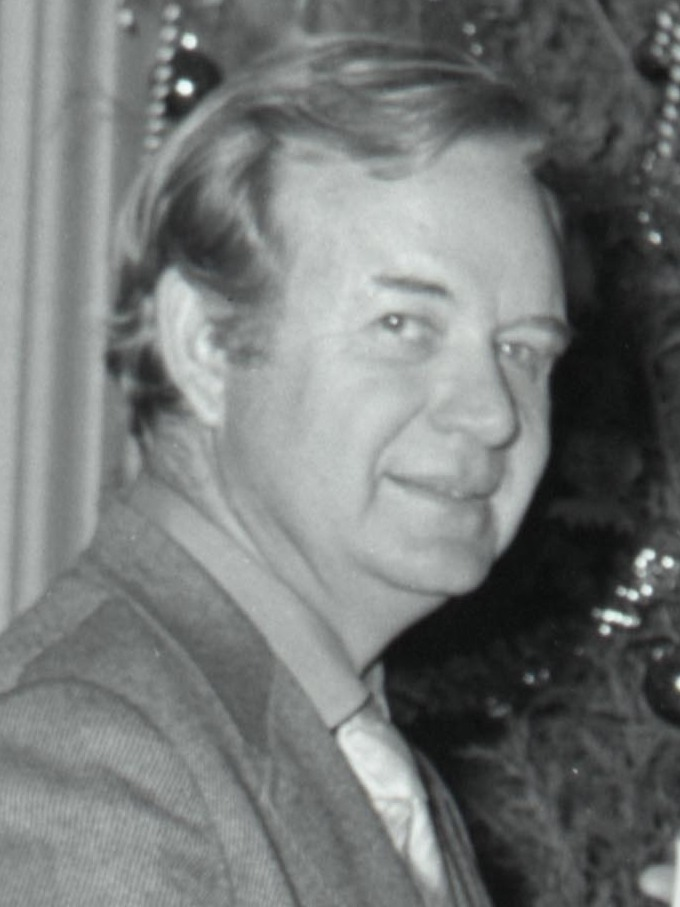

6th Texas Agriculture Commissioner
- In office January 1951 – 1977
- Governor: Allan Shivers (1951–1957) Price Daniel (1957–1963); John B. Connally Jr. (1963–1969); Preston E. Smith (1969–1973) Dolph Briscoe (1973–1977)
- Preceded by: James E. McDonald
- Succeeded by: Reagan V. Brown

1st United States Deputy Secretary of Agriculture
- In office 1977 – December 1977
- President: Jimmy Carter
- Preceded by: Position established
- Succeeded by: Jim Williams

Chairman of the Democratic National Committee
- In office January 27, 1978 – February 27, 1981
- Preceded by: Kenneth M. Curtis
- Succeeded by: Charles Taylor Manatt

Personal details
- Born: November 26, 1924 Newport, Texas, U.S.
- Died: January 21, 1995 (aged 70) Washington, D.C.
- Resting place: Texas State Cemetery in Austin, Texas
- Spouse: Mary Jean Prince
- Education: Texas Technological College

John Coyle White (November 26, 1924 – January 21, 1995) was an American Democratic politician from Texas. He was the longest-serving Texas Commissioner of Agriculture, first elected in 1950 and serving until his resignation in 1977. He was the youngest person ever elected to statewide office in Texas. From 1977 to 1978, he was United States Deputy Secretary of Agriculture. From 1978 to 1981, he was the chairman of the Democratic National Committee under U.S. President Jimmy Carter.

== Early years ==
White was born in Newport in Clay County in north Texas. His father, Ed White, was a sharecropper. White graduated in 1946 from Texas Technological College in Lubbock.

== Texas agriculture commissioner ==
At the age of twenty-five, White was elected statewide as the Agriculture Commissioner, the youngest person ever elected to statewide office in Texas. He was re-elected twelve times and served 26.5 years in the post. He worked to smooth the transition of Texas from an agricultural to a predominantly urban economy. White established marketing programs that served as models for other state governments. He was responsible for establishing a close working relationship with Mexican agricultural entities that had expanded markets for both countries.

== Deputy Secretary of Agriculture ==
In 1977, U.S. President Jimmy Carter nominated White to serve as Deputy Secretary of the U.S. Department of Agriculture. He was responsible for the implementation of national agriculture policy and was the chief U.S. representative in negotiations with foreign governments, including the Soviet Union, on grain agreements. White served during a period of great unrest among the nation's farmers. His calm and reasoned arbitration with disaffected groups resulted in several successful changes in U.S. farm policy. White resigned his post in 1978, when President Carter tapped him to lead the Democratic National Committee.

== Chairman of the Democratic National Committee ==
He helped the Democratic Party retain its majority in the 1978 congressional elections. The Republicans took control of the presidency and the U.S. Senate in the 1980 elections, but the Democrats retained their majority in the United States House of Representatives under the leadership of Tip O'Neill. John White was DNC chairman at a time when Democrats controlled the White House, the Senate, the House of Representatives, and a majority of governorships.

== Death and burial ==
White died on January 20, 1995, in Washington, D.C. He is interred at the Texas State Cemetery in Austin, Texas.

Political offices
| Preceded by James E. McDonald | Texas Agriculture Commissioner; 1951–1977 | Succeeded by Reagan V. Brown |
Government offices
| Preceded by Missing | United States Deputy Secretary of Agriculture; 1977 – 1978 | Succeeded by James H. Williams |
Party political offices
| Preceded by James E. McDonald | Democratic nominee for Agriculture Commissioner of Texas; 1950, 1952, 1954, 1956, 1958, 1960, 1962, 1964, 1966, 1968, 1970, 1972, 1974 | Succeeded by Reagan V. Brown |
| Preceded by Kenneth M. Curtis | Chairman of the Democratic National Committee; 1978 – 1981 | Succeeded by Charles T. Manatt |
