= James E. McDonald (politician) =

American politician (1881–1952)

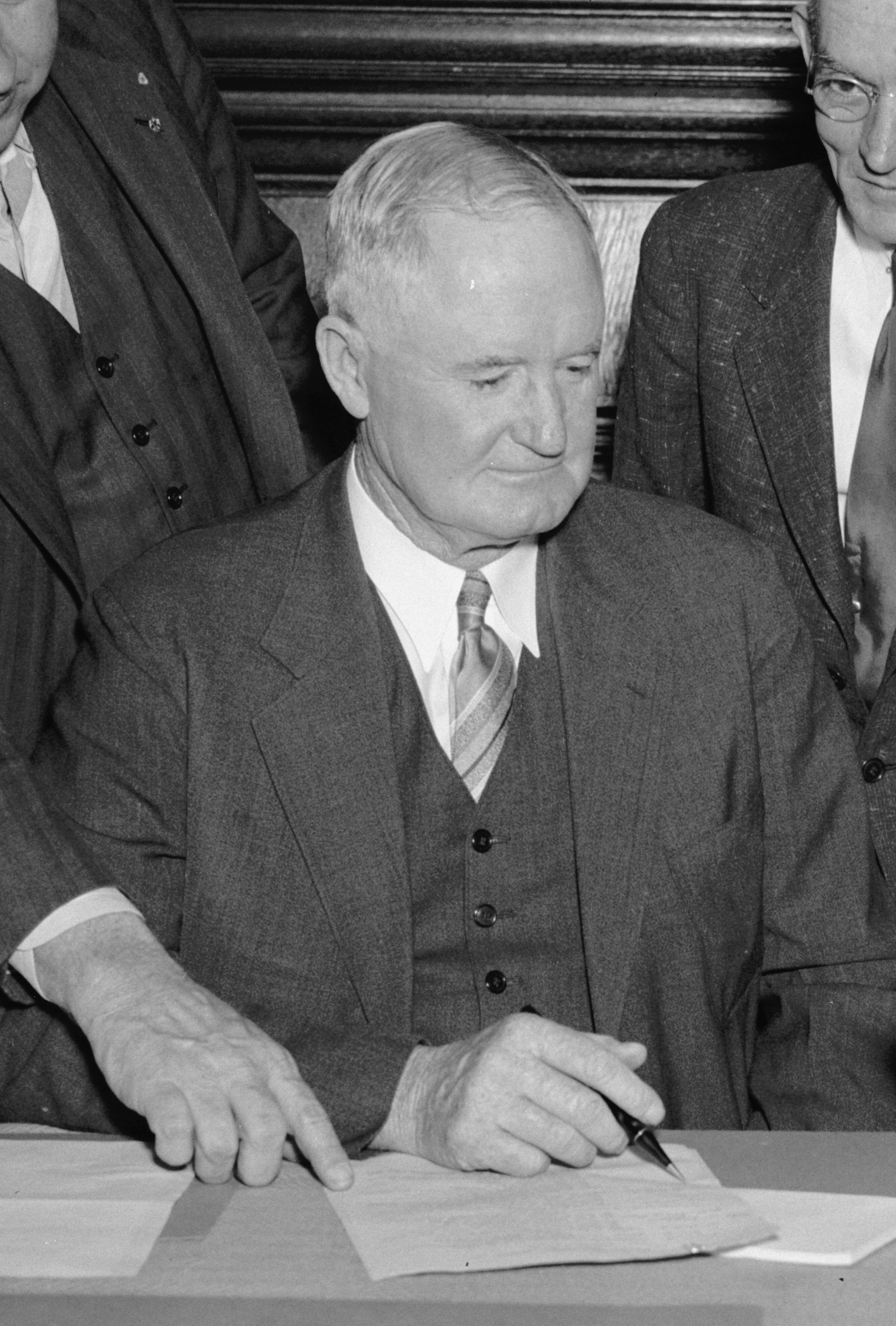
- McDonald in 1938

Texas Agriculture Commissioner
- In office 1931–1951
- Preceded by: George B. Terrell
- Succeeded by: John Coyle White

Personal details
- Born: James Eric McDonald; June 4, 1881 Waxahachie, Texas, US
- Died: June 12, 1952 (aged 71) Waxahachie, Texas, US
- Party: Democratic

James Eric McDonald (June 4, 1881 – June 12, 1952) was an American politician. A Democrat, he served as Texas Agriculture Commissioner from 1931 to 1951.

== Early life and career ==
McDonald was born on June 4, 1881, Waxahachie, Texas to James Edward McDonald and Thula Adams of Alabama. He married Eddie Viola Sims on July 11, 1903. They had two children.

In 1928, McDonald was elected to the Texas House of Representatives representing Waxahachie. He served one term before deciding to run for statewide office. He contested the post of Agriculture Commissioner when incumbent George B. Terrell decided to run for Congress.

== As Agriculture Commissioner ==
McDonald was elected Agriculture Commissioner as a Democrat in 1930.

Although elected as a Democrat on the eve of the Great Depression, McDonald opposed the New Deal, President Franklin D. Roosevelt and crop supports.

During McDonald's administration the Low Water Dam and the Jacks and Stallions programs were created and eliminated. The Low Water Dam Division encouraged farmers to conserve water by building sloughs and ravines. Jacks and Stallions distributed registered and high-grade mules and horses over the state for the purpose of breeding. McDonald's administration also saw the establishment of processing plants for Texas fruits and vegetables and the expansion of the sweet potato, tomato, citrus, black-eyed pea, watermelon, truck-farming, poultry, dairy, and nursery and floral industries.

McDonald was investigated by a Texas House committee in 1935 on nine charges, including misappropriation of department funds related to the Jacks and Stallions program. The House found him guilty of acts ill-becoming a state official, but did not impeach him. He was also under investigation for violations of federal lobbying laws. In exchange for McDonald's support in the 1948 U.S. Senate election, Lyndon Johnson may have used his political influence to delay the investigation of McDonald.

McDonald was reelected every two years until twenty-five-year-old John C. White, the youngest man ever to hold the office, defeated him in the Democratic primary in 1950.

== Final years ==
McDonald died on June 12, 1952, in Waxahachie.

Party political offices
Preceded by George B. Terrell	Democratic nominee for Agriculture Commissioner of Texas; 1930, 1932, 1934, 1936, 1938, 1940, 1942, 1944, 1946, 1948	Succeeded by John Coyle White
Political offices
Texas House of Representatives
Preceded by A. Royce Stout	Member of the Texas House of Representatives from District 100-2 (Waxahachie); 1929–1931	Succeeded by Robert Sparkman
Preceded by George B. Terrell	Texas Agriculture Commissioner; 1931–1951	Succeeded by John C. White
