= Texas Department of Agriculture =

US state agency

Agency overview
- Formed: 1907
- Headquarters: 1700 N. Congress Ave., 11th Floor Austin, Texas
- Employees: 650
- Agency executive: Sid Miller, Commissioner
- Website: www.texasagriculture.gov

The Texas Department of Agriculture (TDA) is a state agency within the state of Texas, which is responsible for matters pertaining to agriculture, rural community affairs, and related matters. It is currently headed by Agriculture Commissioner Sid Miller, a Republican, who was reelected to a 3rd term in 2022. There are multiple divisions in the Texas Department of Agriculture.

== History ==
TDA was established by the 13th Texas Legislature in 1907. TDA is headed by the Texas Agriculture Commissioner, one of four heads of state agencies which is elected by statewide ballot (and the only one where the provision for statewide election is mandated by legislative action, not enshrined in the Texas Constitution) for a four-year term, concurrent with the gubernatorial election (prior to 1978, the term was two years before a statewide amendment in 1974 extended it to four years). John C. White is the longest-serving Agriculture Commissioner in Texas history, with 26 years of service (1951–1977).

The department consists of twelve different district offices in places such as Amarillo, Beaumont, Brenham, Dallas, Houston, Lubbock, Odessa, San Antonio, San Juan, Stephenville, Tyler, and Vernon. Previous to its establishment by legislation of the Thirteenth Legislature in 1907, agriculture in Texas was overlooked by the Bureau of Agriculture, Insurance, Statistics, and History, which notably ignored its responsibility of keeping any official statistics of agriculture and livestock in Texas. Robert Teague Milner was appointed as commissioner until the 1908 election could be held, during which he established a new agency with specific department duties. These duties included gathering statistics, publishing agricultural information, and holding farmers' institutes to promote advanced farming methods and practices. Milner's agency laid down the foundation for what the Texas Department of Agriculture does today.

In order to expand promotional marketing and bring about consumer awareness to agricultural products, the Texas Legislature established the GO TEXAN program in 1999, which expanded markets through eligible participants who were matched to promotional programs provided by the Texas Department of Agriculture.

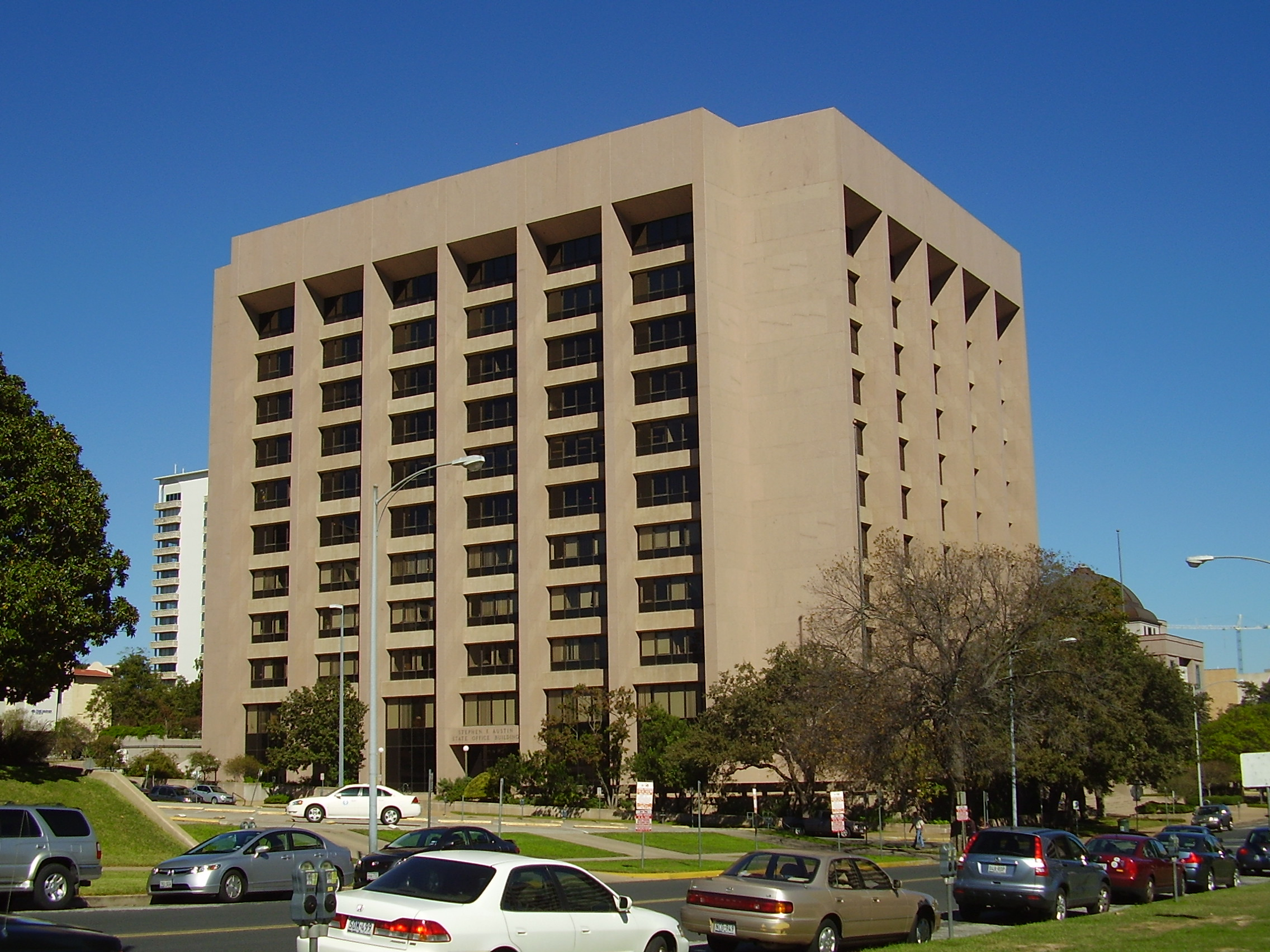
The main offices of the Texas Department of Agriculture are located on the 11th floor of the Stephen F. Austin State Office Building.

The department is headquartered on the 11th floor of the Stephen F. Austin State Office Building at 1700 North Congress Avenue in Austin.

The mission statement of the Texas Department of Agriculture is: "Partner with all Texans to make Texas the nation's leader in agriculture, fortify our economy, empower rural communities, promote healthy lifestyles, and cultivate winning strategies for rural, suburban and urban Texas through exceptional service and the common threads of agriculture in our daily lives."

== Statistics ==
There are a total of 230,662 farms in Texas alone, 389 farms are USDA certified organic farms. There are about 125.5 million acres of farmland, 89% of Texas farms are operated by families and individuals. About 6% of farms are operated by partnerships along with 4% of farms being operated by corporations.

== Commissioners of the Texas Department of Agriculture ==
Milner was appointed as Commissioner prior to the first statewide election in 1908.

Image	Commissioner	Beginning Term Year	Ending Term Year
	Robert Teague Milner	1907	1908
	Edward R. Kone	1908	1914
	Fred Davis	1915	1920
	George B. Terrell	1921	1930
	James E. McDonald	1931	1950
	John C. White	1951	1977
	Reagan V. Brown	1977	1982
	Jim Hightower	1983	1990
	Rick Perry	1991	1998
	Susan Combs	1999	2006
	Todd Staples	2007	2015
	Sid Miller	2015	Present
	Clayton Tucker	Agriculture Commissioner-elect takes office January 1, 2027	

== Divisions ==
The department is divided into the following divisions:

- Administrative Services—Provides TDA support functions
- Communications—Provides media information, public information and TDA internal support services
- Financial Services—Provides TDA accounting, budgetary, and purchasing functions
- Food and Nutrition—Administers the U.S. Department of Agriculture’s School Lunch, School Breakfast, Summer and After School Snack Programs in Texas public schools, including technical assistance and training to school district child nutrition professionals to help them stay abreast of state and federal policies, as well as processing of reimbursements to schools participating in the Child Nutrition Programs
- Legal Affairs—Responsible for providing legal services and counsel to all TDA programs and divisions. Legal Affairs is also responsible for enforcement of the department's regulatory functions, including prosecutions and settlements, and is the liaison with the Texas Attorney General
- Office of Policy and External Relations—Provides support to the Commissioner and the agency by monitoring and analyzing federal and state legislative and regulatory activities that affect Texas Agricultural producers and consumers as well as studying issues that affect rural Texas; also responsible for the management of several TDA grants including the Texas Israel Exchange Program, the Urban School Agricultural Grant Program, the Surplus Food Grant Program, Enology/Viticulture Research Grants, the Leon River Restoration Project Grant and the Feral Hog Damage Abatement Program
- Marketing and Promotion—Works to increase the sales of both raw and processed Texas agricultural commodities by promoting Texas food, fiber, wine, livestock, horticulture and forestry products under the GO TEXAN campaign
- Pesticide Programs—TDA is designated as the state's lead agency in the regulation of pesticide use and application. The division is responsible for licensing and training pesticide applicators, overseeing worker protection, registering pesticides for sale in the state and working to minimize unnecessary impacts to agriculture while enhancing protection of endangered and threatened species as mandated by the federal law
- Regulatory Programs—TDA has a strong consumer protection program, which includes overseeing items like grocery store scales, egg quality, nursery products and gasoline pumps. TDA regularly works with producers to ensure they receive quality seed. This division also ensures the accuracy of weights and measures and protects against the movement of harmful pests into Texas
- Rural Economic Development—Assists rural communities and businesses to create and retain jobs through business development and community assistance, and through the GO TEXAN Rural Community Program, the division promotes agricultural diversification, small town revitalization and rural tourism
