= Cardozo =

Cardozo is a Portuguese surname. It is an archaic spelling of the surname "Cardoso".

== Notable people with this surname ==
- Aaron Cardozo (1762–1834), Gibraltarian consul for Tunis and Algiers
- Albert Cardozo (1828–1885), American jurist in New York City
- Alisson Cardozo (born 1998), Colombian freestyle wrestler
- Benjamin N. Cardozo (1870–1938), American jurist and Supreme Court justice
- Christopher Cardozo (1948–2021), American art collector, curator, photographer, author and publisher
- David de Jahacob Lopez Cardozo (1808–1890), Dutch Talmudist
- Derlis Cardozo (born 1981), Paraguayan footballer
- Efraím Cardozo (1906–1973), Paraguayan politician and historian
- Eleanor Cardozo (born 1965), British artist
- Evelio Cardozo (born 2001), Argentine professional footballer
- Fernando Cardozo (footballer, born 1979), Brazilian football defender
- Fernando Cardozo (footballer, born 2001), Paraguayan football forward
- Francis Lewis Cardozo (1836–1903), Christian clergyman, politician, and educator, first African American to hold a statewide office in the US
- Frederick Cardozo (1916–2011), British Army officer
- Fulganco Cardozo (born 1988), Indian footballer
- Gabri Cardozo (born 1997), Uruguayan footballer
- Geoffrey Cardozo (born 1950), British Army officer
- Harold Cardozo (1888–1963), English journalist, soldier, and author
- Henry Cardozo (1830–1886), American politician from South Carolina, brother of Francis and Thomas
- Horacio Cardozo (born 1979), Argentine footballer
- Ian Cardozo (born 1937), Indian Army officer
- Jacob Cardozo (1786–1873), American political economist, statistician, newspaper editor, journalist, and publisher
- José Cardozo (born 1971), Paraguayan footballer
- José Eduardo Cardozo (born 1959), Brazilian lawyer and attorney general
- Jujuba Cardozo (born 1991), Brazilian footballer
- Julián Cardozo (born 1991), Argentine footballer
- Lida Lopes Cardozo Kindersley (born 1954), also known as Lida Lopes Cardozo and Lida Cardozo Kindersley; letter-cutter, typeface designer, author and publisher
- Maycon Cardozo (born 2008), Brazilian footballer
- Michael A. Cardozo (1941–2025), American lawyer
- Nate Cardozo, American privacy and civil rights lawyer
- Neri Cardozo (born 1986), Argentine footballer
- Óscar Cardozo (born 1983), Paraguayan footballer
- Ramón Cardozo (born 1986), Paraguayan footballer
- Rudy Cardozo (born 1990) Bolivian footballer
- Thomas Cardozo (1838–1881), American educator, journalist, and politician, brother of Henry and Francis
- Tomazinho Cardozo (born 1946), Indian politician and writer
- William Warrick Cardozo (1905–1962), American medical researcher
- Zenito Cardozo (born 1988), Indian gangster

== See also ==
- Benjamin N. Cardozo School of Law, in New York City
- Cardoza, related name
- Cardozo (disambiguation)
