= Júnior Paulista =

Júnior Paulista (literally Jr. of São Paulo state) may refer to:

- José Cristiano de Souza Júnior (born 1977), Brazilian footballer
- Fladimir Rufino Piazzi Júnior (born 1978), Brazilian footballer
- Luiz António Gaino Júnior (born 1981), Brazilian footballer

== See also ==
- Juninho Paulista (born 1973), Brazilian footballer
