= Cardozo (disambiguation) =

Cardozo is a Spanish or Portuguese surname.

Cardozo may also refer to:

- U Street (Washington, D.C.) or Cardozo, a street and neighborhood in Washington, D.C.
- U Street station, a Washington Metro station formerly named "U Street-Cardozo"
- Benjamin N. Cardozo School of Law, Yeshiva University, New York City

== See also ==
- Cardozo High School (disambiguation)
- Cardoza, related surname
- Cardoso (disambiguation), modern Portuguese spelling
