= Oscar Cooper =

Oscar Cooper may refer to:

- Oscar H. Cooper, American educator, president of Baylor University, 1899–1902
- Oscar James Cooper, African-American physician and cultural leader
