= Yemassee =

Yemassee may refer to:

- Yamasee, a Native American people
- Yemassee, South Carolina
- Yemassee (journal), a literary journal
- The Yemassee, an 1835 novel by William Gilmore Simms
