= Michael Tobias =

American author (born 1951)

Michael Charles Tobias
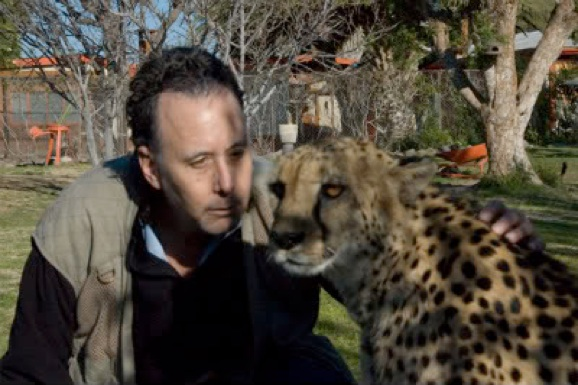
- Michael Tobias with a cheetah
- Born: June 27, 1951 (age 74)
- Occupations: Author; Environmentalist; Anthropologist; Mountaineer; Filmmaker

Michael Charles Tobias (born June 27, 1951) is an American author, environmentalist, mountaineer, and filmmaker. In 1991, Tobias produced a ten-hour dramatic television series, Voice of the Planet, for Turner Broadcasting; the series starred William Shatner. Tobias has written numerous books, most notably World War III: Population and the Biosphere at the End of the Millennium.

== Early life and career ==
In 1977, Tobias received a PhD from the University of California, Santa Cruz, in the History of Consciousness, a humanities department.

He directed a mountaineering film in 1984. Called Cloudwalker, it was recorded for the UK's Channel 4. The film chronicled a failed attempt at an ascent on the Moose's Tooth in the Ruth Gorge Amphitheatre of Alaska's McKinley range (now Denali).

== Conservation ==
Michael Tobias's PBS film Ahimsa –Nonviolence premiered in the United States on December 25, 1987. Taking three years to make, it was the first major film to portray the life of Jains (a religious group) in India. Southeast Asian religions professor Christopher Chapple said that the film "elegantly portrays several Jain leaders and extols the religion as the great champion of animal rights and nonviolent living".

In a cover story for the New York Academy of Sciences publication The Sciences, Tobias called for an Antarctic World Park, citing threats to the potential area for large-scale habitat preservation. He released a 1987 PBS film entitled Antarctica: The Last Continent with a similar topic, proposing the creation of an "international park" in Antarctica similar to national parks in the US. According to The Christian Science Monitor, the film explores "the discovery of Antarctica and the multinational claims to ownership".

In a Discovery Channel documentary about the Exxon Valdez disaster, named Black Tide, he considered the dilemma of safely using oil resources.

Tobias has been involved in wildlife preservation efforts. In New Zealand, he has overseen ecological restoration of a peninsula in the far south of the country, adjoining Rakiura National Park.

Dorji Wangmo Wangchuck, first wife of the fourth king of Bhutan, described Tobias's efforts as being "invaluable for policymakers and scientists ... [and] inspiration for the next generation of young ecologists wanting to make a difference in the world".

== Population and environment ==
Tobias wrote a book about the growing world population, the environment, and the potential for a third world war called World War III: Population and the Biosphere at the End of the Millennium.

The magazine Psychology Today wrote that it "reads like a volcano erupting ... Tobias throws sparks like an evangelist and has the old-fashioned, wide-ranging erudition of a Renaissance scholar". Scientist Marc Lappé described World War III as "a lengthy and complex treatise that is a distillation of a lifetime of thought and action concerning the human condition. ... It provides a thread of hope, offering a new vision about how humankind may ultimately come to peace with nature." Anthropologist Jane Goodall, writing of the book in 1998, said, "Tobias describes for us a path that we could take – a path mapped out by a combination of scientific, logical, intuitive, and spiritual reasoning – towards a future where all is not, after all, lost." In her foreword to World War III, she also said that Tobias has provided "ample scientific proof of the large-scale habitat destruction and loss of biodiversity that has and continues to take place". In 1994, during the UN International Conference on Population and Development, the Montreal Gazette quoted Tobias: "For purposes of absolute clarity I call it World War III," as The Gazette extrapolated from Tobias's perspective, "the most terrifying problem humanity has ever faced".

Tobias directed a feature-film documentary called No Vacancy, which is based on his book and also focuses on the growing world population. Journalist Ellen Snortland, writing in the Pasadena Weekly, stated that "No Vacancy, written and directed by Michael Tobias, is to the world's population explosion what Al Gore's An Inconvenient Truth is to global warming".

== Other works ==
Tobias received the international Courage of Conscience Award in 1996.

In 2004, Tobias received the Parabola Magazine Focus Award.

He delivered the annual address at the University of London School of Oriental and African Studies in March 2012 as the opening for a symposium on conservation biology, animal rights, and comparative religions. Ingrid Newkirk, co-founder and president of People for the Ethical Treatment of Animals, described Tobias as "one of the world's great souls". In 2013, Tobias gave an address to the Institute for Urban and Environmental Studies, the Research Centre for Sustainable Development, and the Chinese Academy of Social Sciences at their annual conference in Tianjin and Binhai. He has also given addresses in Monterrey, Mexico, for the Fifth Conference on Worldwide Values, and at the 21st International Meeting of the Club of Budapest in Hungary.

Tobias is an honorary member of the Club of Budapest.

Tobias is a contributing writer for Forbes online.

== Teaching ==
From 2001 to 2002, Tobias was Regents Lecturer at the University of California, Santa Barbara, in Environmental Studies. In 2016, he was a Martha Daniel Newell Visiting Scholar at Georgia College & State University.

== Selected works ==
Books
- 1973 Dhaulagirideon, IMAJ Publishers, Limited Edition Book, Antioch, Ohio. Fiction.
- 1974 TSA, IMAJ Publishers, Limited Edition Book, San Francisco, CA. Fiction.
- 1977 A Biography of Self-Consciousness, Ann Arbor Dissertation Archives. Non-fiction.
- 1979 The Mountain Spirit, Co-Edited With Co-Editor Harold Drasdo. Overlook/Viking/Penguin, editions, and Victor Gollancz Ltd., London, edition. Non-fiction.
- 1982 Deva, Avant Books. Fiction.
- 1983 and 1984 Deep Ecology. Ed., Avant Books, San Diego, CA. Non-fiction.
- 1984 After Eden– History, Ecology & Conscience, Slawson Communications, San Diego, CA. Non-fiction.
- 1986 Mountain People, Ed., University of Oklahoma Press, Norman, OK. Non-fiction.
- 1990 Voice of the Planet, Bantam Books, New York. Fiction.
- 1991 Voice of the Planet, Special Edition Large Format Illustrated Book. Privately Published in Alaska to accompany the film series, Adrian Malone Productions, Los Angeles, CA. Non-fiction.
- 1991 Fatal Exposure, Pocket Books/Simon & Schuster, Fiction.
- 1991 Vengzetas Sugarak, Plantan, Budapest. Fiction.
- 1991 and 2000 Life Force – The World of Jainism, Asian Humanities Press, Berkeley, CA. Non-fiction.
- 1992 Believe, Co-Author, with William Shatner. Berkley/Putnam. Fiction.
- 1993 and 1997 Rage & Reason, Rupa & Co., New Delhi, India; and AK Press, Edinburgh, Scotland, and San Francisco.
- 1993 Environmental Meditation, Crossing Press. Non-fiction.
- 1994 A Naked Man, Asian Humanities Press. Fiction.
- 1995 A Parliament of Souls-In Search of Global Spirituality, Co-Edited With Co-editors Jane Gray Morrison and Bettina Gray, KQED/Bay Books. Non-fiction.
- 1995 A Vision of Nature – Traces of the Original World, Kent State University Press, Kent, OH. Non-fiction.
- 1995 and 1996 The Soul of Nature – Visions of a Living Earth, Co-Edited With Co-editor, Georgianne Cowan, Continuum/Penguin-Dutton/Plume editions. Non-fiction.
- 1996 India 24 Hours, Mapin Publishing, Ahmedabad, India. Non-fiction.
- 1996 World War III – Population and the Biosphere at the End of the Millennium, Bear & Co.; Canadian audio book - L’Institut National Canadien Pour les Aveugles (Canadian National Institute for the Blind). Spanish edition El Hombre La Contra De Tierra: población y biosfera al final del milenio, Colección de los Cuatro Vientos, Barcelona. Non-fiction.
- 1997 A Day in the Life of India, Harper Collins, San Francisco, CA. Non-fiction.
- 1997 Nature's Keepers: On the Frontlines of the Fight To Save Wildlife in America, John Wiley & Sons Publishing, New York. Non-fiction.
- 1997 The Search of Reality-The Art of Documentary Filmmaking, (Ed.), M. Wiese Publishing. Non-fiction.
- 1997 Jan & Catharina, Smart Art Press, illustrated novel, with photographs by Rocky Schenk. Fiction.
- 1997 Ich spürte die Seele der Tiere (I Feel The Soul of Animals), (Ed.) with Co-editor Kate Solisti, Frankh-Kosmos Publishing. 2nd edition-2003. Non-fiction.
- 1998 Kinship with Animals, Ed., with co-editor Kate Solisti, Beyond Words Publishing. Non-fiction.
- 1998 World War III –Population and the Biosphere at the End of the Millennium, Revised and Updated Second Edition, Preface By Jane Goodall, Continuum Books, New York. Non-fiction.
- 1999 A Parliament of Minds - Philosophy for a New Millennium, Co-Editor with Co-Editors Dr. Patrick Fitzgerald and Dr. David Rothenberg, State University of New York Press. Non-fiction.
- 1999 Voices From the Underground- For the Love of Animals, New Paradigm Books, Hope Publishing. Non-fiction.
- 2002 TWIMC (To Whom It May Concern), With Co-Author Chris Traub, Verbum Inc., San Francisco, Fiction.
- 2002 La Leggi di Felham, Nuova Etica Publishers, Turin, Italy.
- 2003 A Parliament of Science - Science for the 21st Century, Co-Edited with Co-Editors Teun Timmers and Gill Wright, State University of New York Press. Non-fiction.
- 2003 Dubai 24 Hours, Foreword by Sheikh Hamdan, Motivate Publishing, Dubai, United Arab Emirates. Non-fiction.
- 2005 The Adventures of Mr. Marigold, 1,836 page illustrated ecological epic, Craig Potton Publishing, Photographic illustrations by Craig Potton. Nelson, New Zealand.
- 2006 Turkish edition of Rage & Reason, Öfke, Versus Kitap, Istanbul.
- 2006 No Vacancy - Global Responses to the Human Population Explosion, Co-editor with Co-Editors Bob Gillespie, Jane Gray Morrison and Elizabeth Hughes, Hope Publishing. Non-fiction.
- 2006 Donkey - The Mystique of Equus Asinus, With Co-Author Jane Gray Morrison, Council Oak Books. A Dancing Star Foundation Book. Non-fiction.
- 2007 Belgesel film yapim sanati, Turkish edition of The Search for Reality: The Art of Documentary Filmmaking, Kolaj Kitapigi, Istanbul.
- 2008 Chateau Beyond Time, Council Oak Books. Fiction.
- 2008 2008 Smithsonian FolkLife Festival – Bhutan, Photo Portfolio by Michael Charles Tobias and Jane Gray Morrison, for Ta Dzong/National Museum of Bhutan Exhibition/Permanent Collection: 196 Photographs, Dancing Star Foundation.
- 2008 Endangered Species: Flora and Fauna in Peril, With Co-Author Jane Gray Morrison, Wilding Art Museum, Los Olivos, California. Non-fiction.
- 2008 Sanctuary - Global Oases of Innocence, With Co-Author Jane Gray Morrison, foreword by The Queen of Bhutan, Her Majesty Ashi Dorji Wangmo Wangchuck, Council Oak Books. Non-fiction.
- 2010 God's Country: The New Zealand Factor, With Co-Author Jane Gray Morrison, Introduction by Ingrid Newkirk/PETA, A Dancing Star Foundation Book. Non-fiction.
- 2010 Bestiarium, German edition of Chateau Beyond Time, Bastei Lübbe. Bastei Entertainment.
- 2011 Professor Parrot and the Secret of the Blue Cupboard, Zorba Press, Ithaca, New York. Fiction.
- 2012 The Strange Life & Disappearance of English Milligrams, Zorba Press, Ithaca, New York. Fiction.
- 2013 21st Century Solitude, Zorba Press, Ithaca, New York. Fiction.
- 2013 The Misadventure of Pinocchio, Zorba Press, Ithaca, New York. Fiction.
- 2013 Biotopia, Zorba Press, Ithaca, New York. Fiction.
- 2014 Hope On Earth: A Conversation, With Co-Author Paul R. Ehrlich, University of Chicago Press. Non-fiction.
- 2014 Central Park: A Conversation in Three Acts, Zorba Press, Ithaca, New York. Fiction.
- 2014 Why Life Matters: Fifty Ecosystems of the Heart and Mind, with Co-Author Jane Gray Morrison, Springer Publishers, New York. Non-fiction.
- 2014 The Metaphysics of Protection, with Co-Author Jane Gray Morrison. Foreword by Dr. Ervin Laszlo, Preface by Dr. Marc Bekoff. Waterside Productions, Cardiff, CA.
- 2014 and 2015 Environmental Impact, Society of Animal Artists, David Wagner, Curator, Catalogue Essay with Co-Author Jane Gray Morrison. Non-fiction.
- 2015 Edward W. Curtis: One Hundred Masterworks, by Christopher Cardozo, With Contributions by A.D. Coleman, Eric Jolly, Michael Tobias and Louise Erdrich, Prestel Publishers, Random House, New York. Non-Fiction.
- 2016 Nikos Kazantzakis, Screenplay, Zorba Press, Ithaca, New York, Non-fiction.
- 2016 The Adventures of Mr. Marigold, Kindle and Paperback Editions from Zorba Press, Ithaca, New York. Fiction.
- 2016 Undaunted - A Utopian Opera
- 2016 Russian Translation of The Metaphysics of Protection – Metaphysika zaschiti prerodi (МЕТАФИЗИКА ЗАЩИТЫ ПРИРОДЫ).
- 2016 Codex Orféo, Springer Publishers, New York. Fiction.
- 2017 Anthrozoology: Embracing Co-Existence in the Anthropocene, with Co-Author Jane Gray Morrison, Springer Publishers, New York. Non-Fiction.
- 2017 Ideal Algebra, Zorba Press. Fiction.
- 2018 The Theoretical Individual: Imagination, Ethics and the Future of Humanity, with Co-Author Jane Gray Morrison, Springer Publishers, New York. Non-Fiction.
- 2018 The Tuscany Dialogues: Human Consciousness, Ecology and the Universe, with co-author Dr. Ervin Laszlo, SelectBooks, New York. Non-Fiction.
- 2018 The Earth Quartet, Zorba Press. Fiction.
- 2018 The Eradication of Diphtheria Tetanus, A Play in Two Acts, Waterside Productions, Cardiff, CA. Fiction.
- 2019 Bionomics In The Dragon Kingdom: Ecology, Economics and Ethics in Bhutan, with Dr. Ugyen Tshewang and Jane Gray Morrison, Springer Nature, New York and Switzerland, Non-Fiction.
- 2019 The Hypothetical Species: Variables of Human Evolution, with Co-Author Jane Gray Morrison, Springer Nature Switzerland AG, Non-Fiction.

Films
- 1984 Kazantzakis, Writer, director, producer, Co-Composer. PBS.
- 1984 House for All Seasons, Writer, 2 specials. PBS.
- 1984 Cloudwalker, Writer, director, producer. Channel 4/London.
- 1985-87 Science Notes, Writer, director, producer, editor, host. Thirty-two part series. PBS.
- 1986 Sand and Lightning, Writer, director, producer, editor, host. Documentary. PBS.
- 1986 Space Futures, Writer, director, producer, editor, host. Documentary. PBS.
- 1986 Playing God, Narrator. Documentary. PBS.
- 1986 The Gift, Writer, director, producer, editor, host. Documentary. PBS.
- 1986-87 Animal Rights, Writer, director, producer, editor, host. With three other MacNeil-Lehrer PBS specials.
- 1987 Antarctica - The Last Continent, Writer, director, producer, editor, host. Documentary, PBS.
- 1987 Ahimsa - Non-Violence, Writer, director, executive producer, Documentary, PBS.
- 1989 The Power Game, Co-Executive producer for Maryland Public Broadcasting, Corporation for Public Broadcasting (CPB/PBS), four hour series. Phillip Burton Production, with MPT.
- 1989 Black Tide, Writer, director, producer. Discovery Channel.
- 1990 The Making of Voice of the Planet, Writer, director, producer, executive producer. TBS.
- 1990 Voice of the Planet, Writer, director, producer, executive producer, Starring William Shatner and the Voice of Faye Dunaway. Ten-Hour Dramatic Miniseries, TBS (Turner Broadcasting).
- 1991 The Fifth Annual Genesis Awards, Director, producer. Discovery Channels.
- 1992 A Day in the Life of Ireland, Writer, director. PBS-WNET/RTL-Dublin.
- 1992 The Sixth Annual Genesis Awards, Director, producer. Discovery Channels.
- 1993 A Parliament of Souls, Writer, director, producer, 28- and 32- part series, PBS/Vision TV-Canada.
- 1995 World War III, Writer, director, producer, executive producer, host. Documentary. PBS.
- 1996 A Day in the Life of India, Writer, director, producer. Feature film. PBS/Doordarshan/NHK/StarPlus.
- 1997 Element One, Writer, director. A Geoffrey Holland production.
- 1997 Jam Packed, Director, co-executive producer. A Geoffrey Holland production.
- 1997 Sean Connery – An Intimate Portrait, Writer, Director. LifeTime Television Network.
- 1997 The Originals, Co-Executive producer, Director. CMM Productions, Mumbai, India.
- 1997 Climb For Tibet, Director. Wisdom Network special.
- 1998 The Wetlands of Japan: The Legacy of Ishahaya Bay, Director, producer. Short-subject documentary. Goldman Foundation.
- 1998 Renewable Power, Executive Producer. A Geoffrey Holland Film.
- 1998 America’s Great Parks, Writer, Two-Hour Feature Documentary, Discovery Channel.
- 1998 Legends And Dreamers, Co-Director, Producer, KAET/PBS.
- 1998 A Parliament of Science, Director, Co-Host, Multi-Part Series, Vision TV/London, With UNESCO.
- 1998 At Home In The Universe – Biography of William Shatner, Writer, Director. Harvey McKinnon Productions. Canadian Broadcasting Corporation.
- 1999 A Parliament of Minds, Director, Producer, Hosted by Mike Malone, 15-part series, PBS/Wisdom Network.
- 1999 The Whale Shark Hunters of the Philippines, Executive Producer, KETA Films, National Geographic Channel
- 1999 River Of Love, Writer, Director. Feature Docu-Drama, Dharmic Productions.
- 1999 Kids & Animals, Director, Co-Writer, Animal Planet/Discovery Networks.
- 1999 Reigning Cats of San Francisco, Director, Writer, Animal Planet/Discovery Networks.
- 1999 The Last Stand: The Battle to Save Ballona Wetlands, Co-Writer, Co-Executive Producer, Hosted by Ed Asner, Feature Documentary, A Sheila Laffey Film, Public Broadcasting.
- 2000 The View From Malabar, Director, Documentary, Ohio PBS.
- 2000 Countdown: The Sky’s On Fire, Co-Executive Producer, Based upon the Novel, Fatal Exposure, by Michael Charles Tobias, Two-Hour dramatic Movie-of-the-Week, ABC.
- 2001 Images of Arizona, Senior Director, Producer. KAET/PBS. Emmy Award winning.
- 2002 Dubai 24 Hours, Writer, Director. Feature film Documentary. Al Arabiya TV.
- 2002 J.C. Leyendecker - The Great American Illustrator, Writer. Kultur Video.
- 2003 Y.M.I., Co-Executive Producer, dramatic feature, Temple 4 Films.
- 2004 The Hydrogen Age, Co-Writer. A Geoffrey Holland Film.
- 2005 Mad Cowboy, Writer Director, Executive Producer, Hosted by Howard Lyman of Voice for a Viable Future, KQED/PBS.
- 2006 No Vacancy, Writer, Director, Directory of Photography, Producer, Executive Producer, Hosted by Bob Gillespie of Population Communication, public broadcasting service.
- 2008 Hotspots, Writer, Director, Producer, Co-Director of Cinematography, Executive Producer, Hosted by Dr. Russell Mittermeier of Conservation International, Two-Hour Feature Documentary, KQED/PBS.
- 2009 The Grand And Otago Skinks: Conservation of Two of New Zealand’s Rarest Reptiles, Writer, Director, Producer. Short Subject Documentary, Dancing Star Foundation.
- 2011 State of the Earth, Director, three-hour documentary series, Dancing Star Foundation/Earth Service Production.
- 2012 Yasuni – A Meditation On Life, Writer, Director, Executive Producer, UNDP/Yasuni-ITT Initiative, Government of Ecuador, for Rio+20 U.N. Earth Summit Premiere. A Dancing Star Foundation Film.
- 2013 Ecosystems on the Edge, 15 Short Ecological Documentaries. Co-Executive Producer for Dancing Star Foundation, the Primary Collaborating Partner with the Smithsonian Environmental Research Center (SERC).
- 2016 bioreverie, Writer, Executive Producer. One-hour documentary, GCSU (Georgia College and State University).
