= Ricardo Ramos =

Ricardo Ramos may refer to:

- Ricardo Ramos (footballer) (born 1980), Brazilian footballer
- Ricardo Ramos (athlete) (born 1985), Mexican long-distance runner
- Ricardo Ramos (fighter) (born 1995), Brazilian mixed martial artist
