= Thomas S. Gathright =

American educator (1829–1880)

2nd President of the Henderson Male and Female College
- In office December 3, 1879 – May 24, 1880
- Preceded by: Oscar H. Cooper

1st President of the State Agricultural and Mechanical College of Texas
- In office October 4, 1876 – November 21, 1879
- Succeeded by: John Garland James

Mississippi Superintendent of Public Instruction
- In office April 3, 1876 – September 1876
- Governor: John Marshall Stone
- Preceded by: Thomas Cardozo
- Succeeded by: Joseph Bardwell

Personal details
- Born: Thomas Sanford Gathright; January 5, 1829 Monroe County, Georgia, U.S.
- Died: May 24, 1880 (aged 51) Henderson, Texas, U.S
- Resting place: Old City Cemetery, Henderson, Texas, U.S.
- Party: Democratic
- Spouse: Sophronia Ann Prince (m. 1851)

Philosophical work
- Era: 19th-century philosophy
- Region: American philosophy
- Institutions: Summerland Institute; State Agricultural and Mechanical College of Texas; Henderson Male and Female College

Thomas Sanford Gathright (January 5, 1829 – May 24, 1880) was an American educator and the first president of the State Agricultural and Mechanical College of Texas, now known as Texas A&M University, and the second president of Henderson Male and Female College. He founded what would later become the only functioning secondary school in Mississippi during the American Civil War and was the state Superintendent of Public Instruction in 1876.

== Early life ==
Thomas Sanford Gathright was born in Monroe County, Georgia, on January 5, 1829. His father died when he was at an early age and his family moved to Alabama in the late 1830s. He attended the Green Springs School for Boys under Henry Tutwiler near Greensboro, Alabama. Gathright first taught at Mount Hebron, Alabama, in 1850. He moved to Mississippi in 1853 and began operating a private school, the Summerville Institute in Gholson, Mississippi, in 1854. The school succeeded well in its enterprise, and was the only functioning secondary school in Mississippi during the civil war. It was damaged by a fire in 1869. After rebuilding and resuming his profession, Gathright continued until the school was again destroyed by fire in 1875.

== Civil War ==
In 1862 he sent a letter to the governor of Mississippi, John J. Pettus, pleading for the governor to use his "influence with the Secretary of War" to have himself "exempted from military service" due to family obligations and "frail health".

On August 16, 1864, he sent a letter to the governor of Mississippi, Charles Clark, requesting an exemption from Confederate military service.

== Career ==
He operated the Summerville Institute in Gholson, Mississippi, from 1854 to 1876. He was appointed the Superintendent of Public Instruction of Mississippi on April 3, 1876.

He was the Grand Master of Masons of the Grand Lodge of Mississippi in 1868 and 1869. As Grand Master, Gathright presided over the expulsion of William Wallace Chisolm in 1868, later the victim of the Chisolm Massacre, for "his connection with forged papers" and "unmasonic conduct". Gathright would later write a letter defending the brother of murder victim John William Gully, who was charged with instigating the massacre of Chisolm and his family.

He was appointed by Governor Stone and confirmed by the Mississippi Senate as the Superintendent of Public Instruction in Mississippi of the Democratic party in 1876 and wrote to the Hinds County Superintendent of Education in a letter described by the Grange as "admirable".

Early in July, Gathright wrote a letter to county superintendents of education to explain why the Mississippi Legislature had proceeded with the reduction of salaries for public teachers and county superintendents, which construed "the teachers engaged in the public schools of Mississippi, as a class, do not reach the plane of respectability". He was listed as the chairman of the Teacher's State Convention in Mississippi on July 16, 1876, and requested to withdraw from the position of chairman during the convention. Gathright resigned from his position as Mississippi Superintendent of Public Instruction in September to accept the position of president of the State Agricultural and Mechanical College of Texas.

=== First President of A&M College of Texas ===
On July 15, 1876, Gathright was elected president of the newly founded State Agricultural and Mechanical College of Texas. The new school was located four miles from Bryan, Texas, immediately on the Houston and Texas Central Railway. His initial salary was $3,000.

On October 4, 1876, on the recommendation of former Confederate president Jefferson Davis after he had declined the position, Thomas Sanford Gathright officially assumed office as the first president of the State Agricultural and Mechanical College of Texas (the future Texas A&M University). At the inauguration of the college, Gathright stated to those assembled:

To the full success of the college, I can promise the best efforts of my colleagues in the faculty, as I pledge my own. They may not be the proper men to work out success, and may be called to give place to others. I may not be suited to my place, and may retire; still this great work, in which all the people of this good state are interested, must go on and must succeed.

Gathright also became the chief executive of what was founded as the Alta Vista Agricultural and Mechanical College of Texas for Colored Youth, now known as Prairie View A&M University, as part of his role as president. It was general policy for there to be a supervisor over the nominal black head of the institution known as "the principal". Gathright urged for his friend, L. W. Minor, a heavy African-American man from Mississippi to be the first principal of the college. The institution was constructed upon the ruins of the old slave plantation known as Alta Vista, owned by Jared Ellison Kirby, a colonel in the Confederate States Army. The school later changed names to the Prairie View State Normal School, before settling on its current name in 1973. The school was closed on February 22, 1879, for some time, and the professor was dismissed by Gathright.

In the A&M College of Texas's first year he was the president, head of the commercial department, and professor of Mental and Moral Philosophy and Belles-lettres. He taught single and double entry bookkeeping and the philosophies and morals of business. In his third year his title as professor changed to professor of Mental and Moral Philosophy and Book-keeping.

In November of 1879, the college's board of directors conducted an investigation and passed a resolution that determined "there exists... such a want of harmony and co-operation as to prevent its proper and successful management." The board asked the entire faculty to resign and Gathright tendered his notice of resignation on November 21, 1879. Gathright was reportedly at odds with some members of the faculty, and a few prominent members of the Bryan community, who felt that he was opposed to the "agricultural and mechanical features of the institution" and "preferred to make of it a military training school and a purely literary institution", especially Alexander O. Hogg, the professor of pure mathematics. One particular disagreement between professor Hogg and president Gathright was the nomination of John C. Crisp to the position of commandant of cadets, which Gathright had supported and Hogg was against. Gathright himself had considered the removal of Hamilton P. Bee as the college's steward as the "moving cause of all the difficulties at Bryan" and believed some of the professors made it seem like he was strongly in favor of the removal although he had "merely took the ground that the State would gain financially by abolishing the office of steward" and expressed doubt towards the policy of removing Bee from the position. Gathright's administration faced the burden of organizing the college, an undefined curriculum, unreliable water cisterns, a shortage of student housing, and enrollment difficulties.

=== Second President of the Henderson Male and Female College ===
Gathright became the second president of the Henderson Male and Female College in 1879, serving about a year before his death. He succeeded Oscar H. Cooper. At the time of Gathright's death he was seeking positions elsewhere and was set to depart the college in June.

== Death ==
Gathright died suddenly on May 24, 1880, in Henderson, Texas, of neuralgia of the bowels. He is buried at the Old City Cemetery in Henderson along with Robert Teague Milner, a fellow president of the A&M College of Texas.

== Sources ==
Academic offices
Preceded by Oscar H. Cooper	President of the Henderson Male and Female College; 1879–1880	Succeeded by Unknown
Preceded by None	President of the State Agricultural & Mechanical College of Texas; 1876–1879	Succeeded by John Garland James
Political offices
Preceded by Thomas Cardozo	Mississippi Superintendent of Public Instruction; 1876	Succeeded by Joseph Bardwell
