= Yamasee (disambiguation) =

Yamasee, Yemassee or Yamassee could refer to:

- Yamasee, an extinct Native American tribe of the Southern United States
- Yamasee War (1715–1717), a conflict fought in South Carolina between British settlers and the Yamasee and other allied Native American peoples
- Yemassee, South Carolina, a town in Lowcountry South Carolina in the United States
- The Yemassee, an 1835 historical novel by Southern American writer William Gilmore Simms
- Yemassee, the official literary journal of the University of South Carolina
- Yamassee Native American Moors of the Creek Nation, another name for the black supremacist group Nuwaubian Nation associated with Dwight York
