= Euline Brock =

American educator and politician (1932–2018)

Euline Williams Brock (June 2, 1932 - July 1, 2018) was a mayor, educator, and author in Texas. Her husband Horace Brock and she had a long affiliation with the University of North Texas. The downtown transit center in Denton, Texas, is named for her. She helped establish a scholarship fund for African Americans and light rail service from Denton to Dallas.

== Early life ==
She was born Francis Eline Williams in Jamestown, Texas, and grew up in Van, Texas. She studied at Tyler Junior College before transferring to the University of Texas in Austin and graduating with a bachelor's degree in 1952 and a master's degree in English literature in 1954. She joined the English department of what became the University of North Texas.

== Career ==
After going back to school in the late 1960s for a PhD studying the role of African-American politicians in the Deep South during the post-Civil War Reconstruction era, Brock taught history at Tarrant County College and Texas Woman’s University.

She wrote an article on Jewish and Black Reconstruction-era Mississippi Secretary of Education Thomas W. Cardozo, describing him as a scoundrel.

She served three terms on the city council and was mayor of Denton from 2000 until 2006.

== Personal life ==
She married business professor Horace Brock and had three children. She donated to the Clinton Foundation.
