= William Gilmore Simms =

American writer and politician (1806–1870)

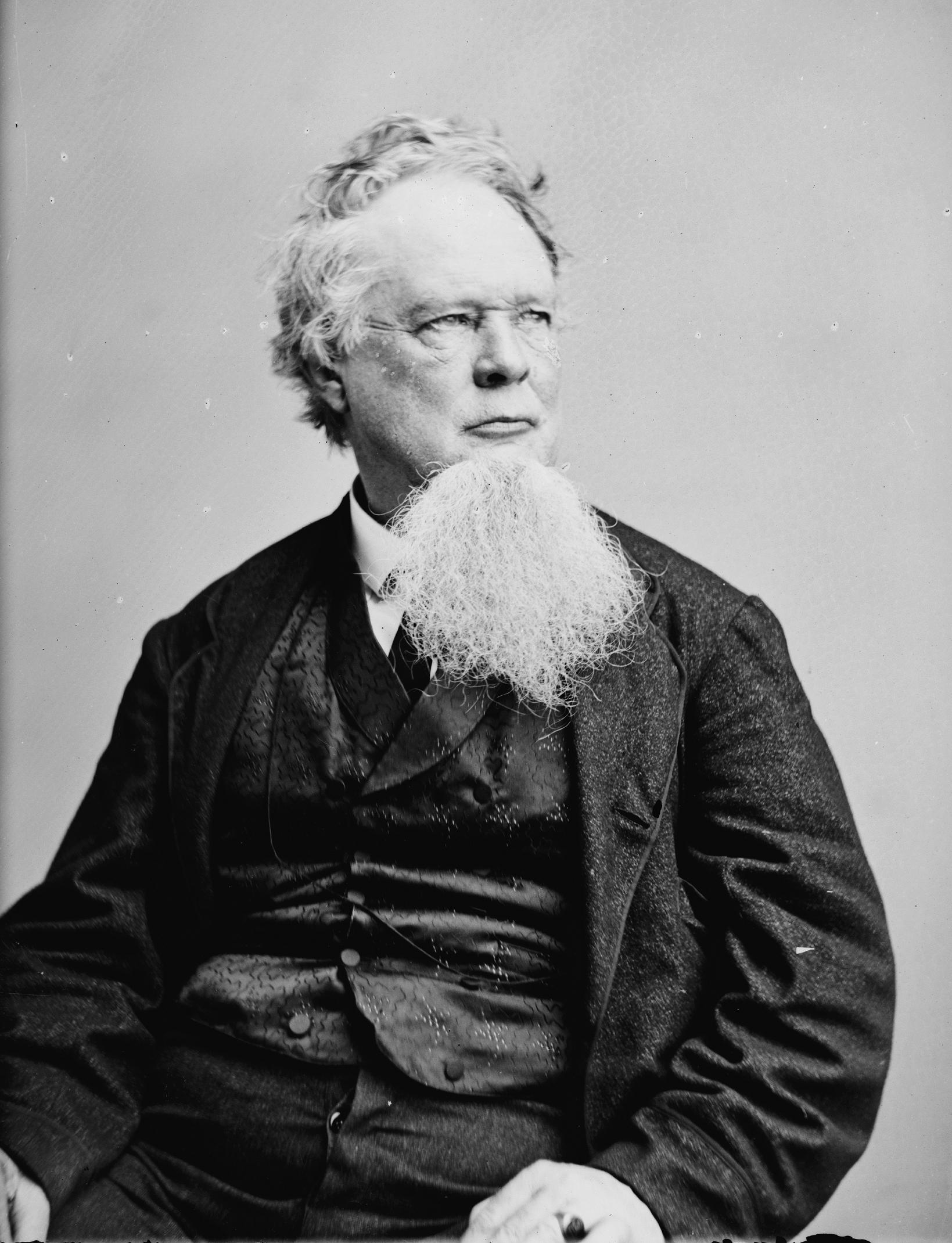
- William Gilmore Simms, circa 1860
- Born: April 17, 1806; Charleston, South Carolina, United States
- Died: June 11, 1870 (aged 64); Charleston, South Carolina, United States
- Occupations: Poet; novelist; historian

William Gilmore Simms (April 17, 1806 – June 11, 1870) was an American poet, novelist, politician and historian from the American South. His writings achieved great prominence during the 19th century, with Edgar Allan Poe pronouncing him the best novelist America had ever produced. He is still known among literary scholars as a major force in antebellum Southern literature. He is also remembered for his strong support of slavery and for his opposition to Uncle Tom's Cabin, in response to which he wrote reviews and the pro-slavery novel The Sword and the Distaff (1854). During his literary career he served as editor of several journals and newspapers and he also served in the South Carolina House of Representatives.

== Early and family life ==
Simms was born on April 17, 1806, in Charleston, South Carolina, of Scots-Irish ancestors. His mother, Harriet Ann Augusta (née Singleton, 1784–1808) died during his infancy; his father William Gilmore Simms Senior (1762–1830) failed in business and joined Coffee's Indian fighters. Simms was raised by his maternal grandmother, Jane Miller Singleton Gates, who had lived through the American Revolutionary War and who told Simms stories about it.

In his teen years, Simms worked as a clerk in a drugstore and aspired to study medicine. Simms began to study law when he was eighteen (circa 1824). He received an honorary LLD from the University of Alabama in 1841.

He married Anna Malcolm Giles in 1826. After her death, he married Chevillette Eliza Roach (pronounced "Roche"), with whom he had 14 children, only 5 of whom lived to adulthood. He was admitted to the South Carolina bar in 1827; however, he soon abandoned this profession for literature.

=== Early writings ===
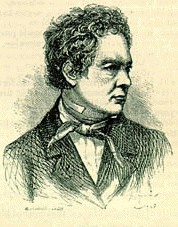
Drawing of Simms

Simms first wrote poetry at the age of eight. In his 19th year, he produced a monody on General Charles Cotesworth Pinckney (Charleston, 1825). Two years later, in 1827, he published Lyrical and Other Poems and Early Lays. In 1828 he became a journalist as well as editor and part owner of the City Gazette, a position he held until 1832 when the publication failed. Simms devoted his attention entirely to writing and in rapid succession published The Vision of Cortes, Cain, and Other Poems (1829); The Tricolor, or Three Days of Blood in Paris (1830); and his strongest long poem, Atalantis, a Tale of the Sea (1832). Atalantis established his fame as an author.

His novel Martin Faber, the Story of a Criminal, an expanded version of an earlier short story called "The Confessions of a Murderer," was published in 1833. Though not considered one of the author's major works, this novella proved consequential for Simms's career in two ways. First, “it was the publication of Martin Faber that changed a poet into a novelist,” as the modest success of this first book-length fiction from the writer launched the prose career that would dominate the rest of Simms's professional life. Second, Martin Faber is highly innovative in its adaption of Gothic tropes to southern fiction. This, combined with the fact that its publication predates the earliest Gothic works of Poe, makes Simms, “for all practical purposes, the founder of the Southern Gothic genre.” The novel, thus, gained Simms a national audience.

=== Editor and politician ===
Simms also edited several South Carolina newspapers, and in the 1840s and 1850s edited important southern journals, including the Magnolia, the Southern and Western, and the proslavery Southern Quarterly Review. During the nullification controversy prompted by South Carolina in 1832, Simms supported Union. In the 1840s he pushed for American freedom from British literary models and supported the intensely nationalistic Young America group.

Based on the popularity of the novels described below, Simms became part of the Southern planter class. He came to firmly support slavery (a "fire-eater"), an attitude that when held widely by Southerners helped lead to secession and creation of the Confederate States of America and the American Civil War. Elected to the South Carolina House of Representatives, Simms served from 1844 to 1846. However he lost election for lieutenant governor of South Carolina by only one vote.

=== Novels about the South ===
Simms wrote a number of popular books between 1830 and 1860, sometimes focusing on the pre-colonial and colonial periods of Southern history, and replete with local color. His first success was with The Yemassee (1835, about the Yemassee War of 1715 in the South Carolina low country). Simms also published eight novels set in South Carolina during the American Revolutionary War, beginning with The Partisan (1835), which was perhaps Simms's most-read novel, and Katharine Walton (1851). Other South Carolina-related books included Mellichampe (1836), The Kinsmen (1841), Woodcraft (1854), The Forayers (1855), Eutaw (1856), and Joscelyn (1867).

He later published ten novels dealing with the expansion into the frontier territory from Georgia to Louisiana, including Richard Hurdis; or, the Avenger of Blood. A Tale of Alabama (1838) and Border Beagles: A Tale of Mississippi (1840). He also wrote about the conflicts between Native Americans, Spaniards and French in Florida in The Lily and the Totem, or, The Huguenots in Florida (1850); Vasconselos (1853; an account of DeSoto's expedition from the Native American viewpoint); and the overlapping experiences of Native Americans, Spanish, and English in The Cassique of Kiawah (1859; a novel set during the 1680s in Colonial-era Charleston). Regarding America's native population, Simms once said that "Our blinding prejudices... have been fostered as necessary to justify the reckless and unsparing hand with which [white Americans] have smitten them in their habitations and expelled them from their country."

At first, Southern readers, especially those in his home town of Charleston, did not support Simms's work, in part because he lacked an aristocratic background. Eventually, however, he was referred to as the Southern version of James Fenimore Cooper, and Charleston residents invited him into their prestigious St. Cecilia Society. In 1845, Simms published The Wigwam and the Cabin (1845); a compilation of short stories, one of which describes a loyal slave. Edgar Allan Poe thought the collection "decidedly the most American of American books". and declared Simms to be "immeasurably the greatest writer of fiction in America." In 1852, Simms published As Good as A Comedy; Or, The Tennessean's Story. It and "Paddy McGann" (1867) constitute his two full-length works of Southern humor; he also wrote "Sharp Snaffles" and "Bill Bauldy", two tall tales. He also wrote poetry and, in a letter to literary critic and poet Rufus Wilmot Griswold, Simms said that he was not interested in form as much as content, torn "between the desire to appear correct, and the greater desire to be original and true".

=== Nonfiction history and biography ===
Simms' History of South Carolina (1842) served for several generations as the standard school textbook on the state's history. He also wrote The Social Principle: The True Source of National Permanence (1843) and several very popular biographies of Revolutionary War heroes Francis Marion, Nathanael Greene, and John Laurens. He also penned a compendium of Captain John Smith's works covering the founding of the Virginia Colony as well as a book detailing the Chevalier Bayard. Simms wrote a history of Alabama, and was a popular lecturer on American history. He accumulated one of the largest collections of Revolutionary War manuscripts in the country. Most of this collection was lost when camp followers of the Union Army burned his home, "Woodlands", located near Bamberg, South Carolina.

=== Pro-slavery writings ===
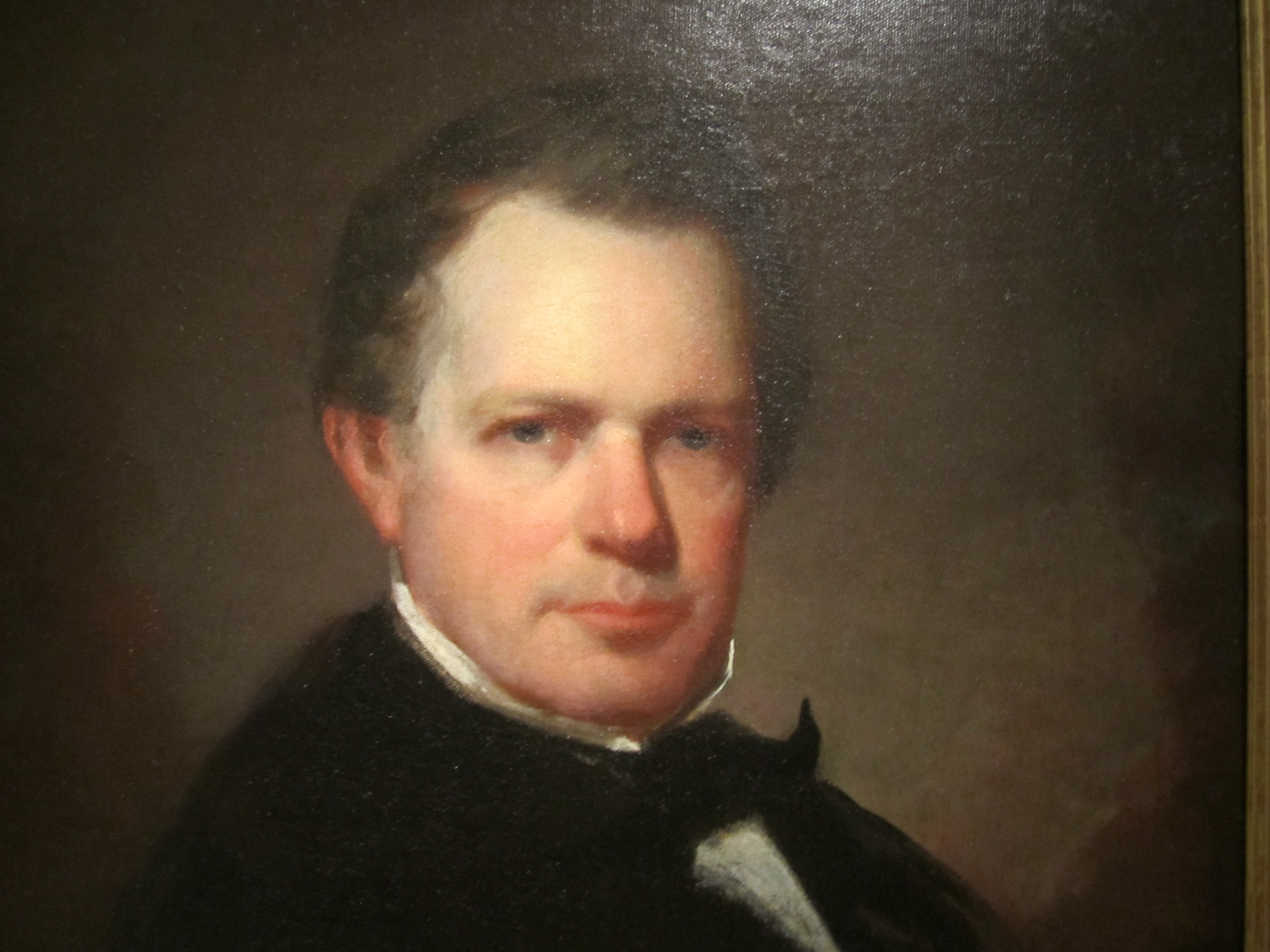
William Gilmore Simms as he appears at the National Portrait Gallery in Washington, D.C.

Simms strongly supported slavery. In the November 1837 issue of the Southern Literary Messenger, Simms published a lengthy review of English social reformer Harriet Martineau's Society in America, a review that essentially functioned as an extended defense of slavery. This essay would be published as a standalone pamphlet the next year under the title Slavery in America; the essay would be republished in 1852 under the title "The Morals of Slavery" as part of the edited volume The Pro-Slavery Argument. Simms was very critical of Uncle Tom's Cabin and wrote negative reviews. Some scholars have argued that his 1852 novel The Sword and the Distaff—republished in a slightly revised edition in 1854 under the title Woodcraft—is an example of Anti-Tom literature; these scholars often rely on the readings of Joseph V. Ridgely. Other scholars see Ridgely's reading as faulty, citing an excessive reliance placed on an offhand remark Simms makes in a letter from 1852 and problems with the chronology of Simms's composition of Woodcraft alongside the publication of Uncle Tom's Cabin.

Simms was part of a "sacred circle" of southern intellectuals including Edmund Ruffin, James Henry Hammond, Nathaniel Beverley Tucker, and George Frederick Holmes. Together they published numerous articles calling for moral reform of the South, including a stewardship role of masters in relation to slavery.

=== American Civil War and final years ===
During the American Civil War, Simms espoused the side of the Secessionists in a weekly newspaper. Only his eldest son, who shared his name, was old enough to serve in the Confederate army, and because of the common name, his identification as a volunteer or conscript private is unclear. While it appears most likely that camp followers of the Union Army burned Simms's house, "Woodlands", one of the previously enslaved people there, Isaac Nimmons, was charged but acquitted of the arson. In the fire a reported 10,000 books and Revolutionary era manuscripts perished.

Other than for the backwoods novel Paddy McGann (1863), Simms published little after the Civil War began. He advised several southern politicians and made elaborate proposals for Confederate military defenses. During the war, he wrote little of literary importance.

At the end of the Civil War, his reputation in tatters as a result of his vocal support of both slavery and secession, Simms attempted without success to relaunch his literary career. He compiled an uneven anthology of Southern war poems in 1866. He died of colon cancer in Charleston on June 11, 1870, and was posthumously inducted into the South Carolina Academy of Authors in 1986.

== Death and legacy ==
Simms died of cancer at his eldest daughter's home at 13 Society Street in Charleston on June 11, 1870. He is buried in Magnolia Cemetery. A large bronze bust of Simms is centrally located in Charleston's Battery Park. The bust was sculpted by John Quincy Adams Ward with a granite base designed by Edward Brickell White. The monument was dedicated in 1879.

In 2016, the family had a ceremony honoring him in Hanahan, South Carolina.

=== Posthumous reputation ===
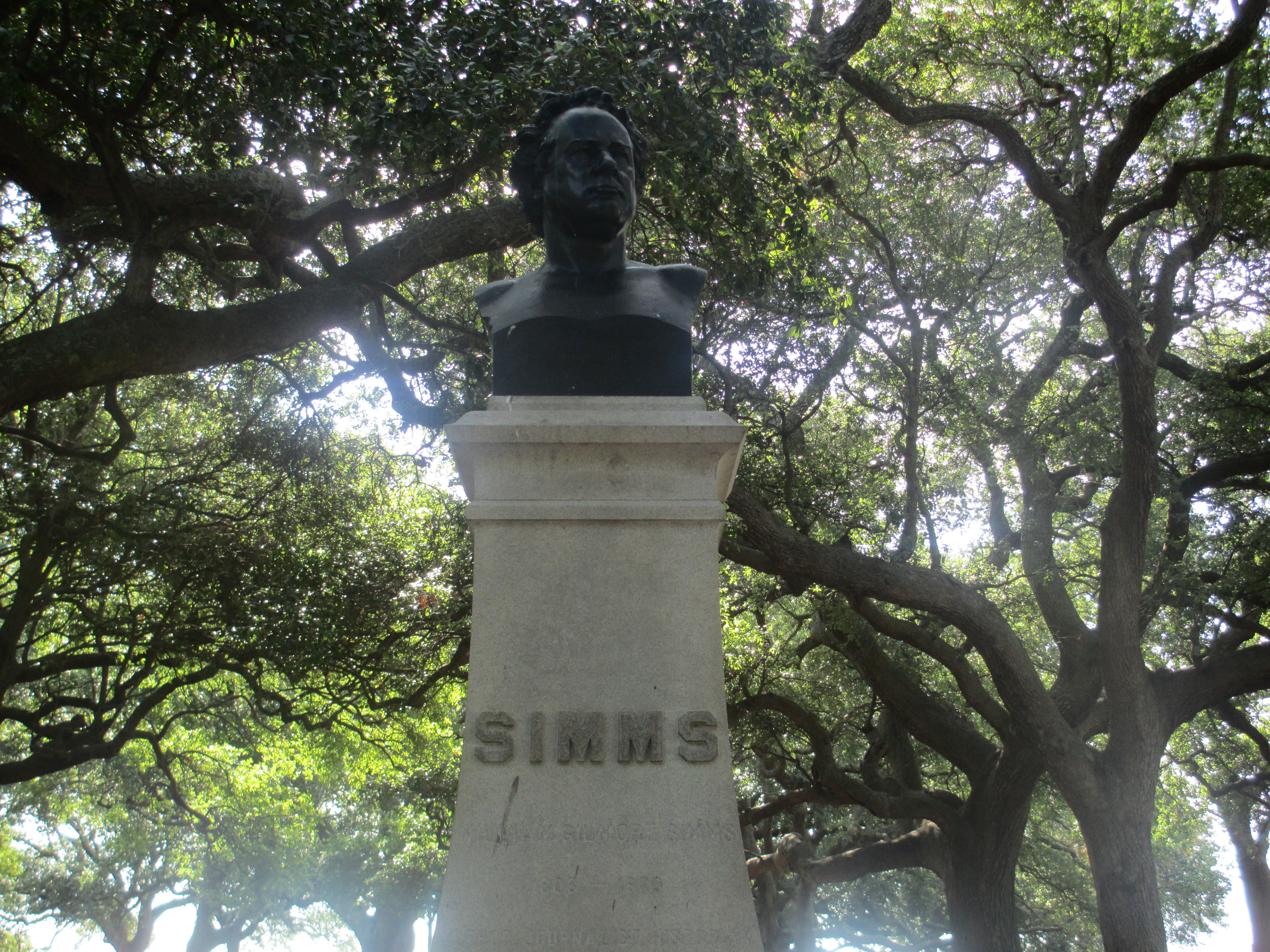
Simms's bust, unveiled in 1879, in The Battery in Charleston, South Carolina

Scholars at DocSouth note Simms's volume of work describes the historic and cultural diversity of the South, from the class hierarchy, sectional self-consciousness and agrarian economy of the Low Country; to both the violence and civilization of the Gulf South (which had both plantations and frontier); and the pioneering of the Appalachian Mountains. David Aiken, an editorial board member of the white nationalist, neo-Confederate, white supremacist organization The League of the South, lamented that Simms was purged from the canon of American literature because of the "unpardonable sin Simms committed when he published an account of Columbia, South Carolina's destruction in which he dared to deny the North a righteous victory." Simms asserted of the North's tactics in the Civil War, "whatever might have existed in virtue of their cause, is forfeit by the processes which they have taken for its maintenance." Author and segregationist Donald Davidson claimed, "The neglect of Simms's stature is nothing less than a scandal when it results....in the disappearance of his books from the common market and therefore from the readers' bookshelf. This is literary murder".

Literary scholars and historians continue to recognize Simms as a major force in Antebellum literature and a leading intellectual. The University of South Carolina has digitized most of his works and papers, which have been digitized by the available as print on demand books. During recent years, a "Simms Renaissance" has included scholars such as James E. Kibler, Mary Ann Wimsatt, Sean Busick, Charles S. Watson, and John C. Guilds. Kibler may be currently the leading authority on Simms's poetry; Guilds produced the major biography of the prolific author; Busick has concentrated on Simms's work as a historian; Wimsatt has published "The Major Fiction of William Gilmore Simms" as well as an edited version of his short stories, titled Tales of the South (a writer for The Virginia Quarterly Review called Wimsatt's introduction to the tales "magisterial"). Contributing to the renaissance is a journal titled The Simms Review. Issued annually, it contains recent articles about the author.

== List of works ==
- Monody, on the Death of Gen. Charles Cotesworth Pinckney (1825)
- Lyrical and Other Poems (1827)
- Tile Vision of Cortes, Cain, and Other Poems (1829)
- The Tricolor, or Three Days of Blood in Paris (1830)
- Atalantis, A Tale of the Sea (1832).
- Martin Faber, the Story of a Criminal (1833)
- Guy Rivers: A Tale of Georgia (1834)
- The Yemassee: A Romance of Carolina (1835)
- The Partisan: A Romance of the Revolution (1835)
- Southern Passages and Pictures (1838)
- Pelayo: A Story of the Goth (1838)
- Mellichampe: A Legend of the Santee (1836)
- Richard Hurdis; or, The Avenger of Blood, A Tale of Alabama (1838)
- Border Beagles: A Tale of Mississippi (1840)
- History of South Carolina (1840, with an expanded second edition in 1860)
- The Kinsmen; or, The Black Riders of Congaree (1841; republished in 1854 as The Scout)
- The Wigwam and the Cabin (1845)
- The Life of Captain John Smith, the Founder of Virginia (1846)
- The Life of the Chevalier Bayard (1847)
- The Lily and the Totem; or, The Huguenots in Florida (1850)
- Katharine Walton; or, The Rebel of Dorchester (1851)
- Norman Maurice; or, The Man of the People (play, 1851)
- As Good as a Comedy; or, The Tennessean's Story (1852)
- The Golden Christmas (1852)
- Vasconselos: A Romance of the New World (1853)
- Southward Ho! A Spell of Sunshine (1854)
- Woodcraft; or, Hawks About the Dovecote: A Story of the South at the Close of the Revolution (1854)
- The Forayers; or, The Raid of the Dog-Days (1855)
- Eutaw: A Tale of the Revolution (1856)
- The Cassique of Kiawah: A Colonial Romance (1859)
- Simms' Poems: Areytos Songs and Ballads of the South (1860)
- A City Laid Waste: The Capture, Sack, and Destruction of the City of Columbia (1865) online
- Joscelyn: A Tale of the Revolution (1867)

== See also ==
- South Carolina literature
