= Thomas Cardozo =

American politician and educator

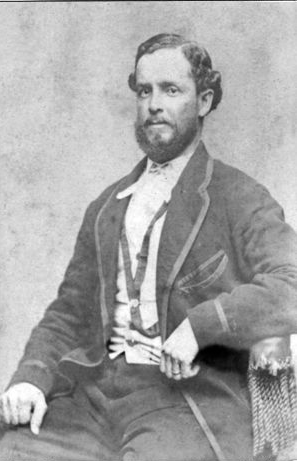

Mississippi Superintendent of Public Instruction
- In office 1874–1876
- Governor: Adelbert Ames
- Preceded by: Henry R. Pease
- Succeeded by: Thomas S. Gathright

Personal details
- Born: December 19, 1838 Charleston, South Carolina, U.S.
- Died: April 13, 1881 (aged 42) Newton, Massachusetts, U.S.
- Party: Republican
- Spouse: Laura J. Williams
- Relatives: Henry Weston Cardozo (brother); Francis Lewis Cardozo (brother); Benjamin N. Cardozo (distant relative)
- Profession: politician; educator; grocer; journalist; postal worker

Thomas Whitmarsh Cardozo (December 19, 1838 – April 13, 1881) was an American educator, journalist, writer, and public official during the Reconstruction Era in the United States. He adopted the name Civis as a nom de plume and wrote as a correspondent for the New National Era, founded by Frederick Douglass. He was the first African American to hold the position of State Superintendent of Education in Mississippi.

== Early life ==
Thomas Whitmarsh Cardozo was born in 1838 in Charleston, South Carolina, as the youngest of five children. His father, Isaac Nunez Cardozo, was part of a well-known Sephardic Jewish family and was a weigher in the U.S. Customs House of Charleston for 24 years, until his death in 1855. Thomas's mother was Lydia Weston, (Note: Although some authors refer to Thomas Cardozo's mother as Lydia Williams, official records for 1855 and 1857 indicate that her name was Lydia Weston. Her deceased former owner was Plowden Weston.) a freed slave (Note: The will of her deceased former owner, Plowden Weston, effectively freed her in 1826, but didn't legally free her.) of mixed ancestry who was a seamstress. He had two older brothers, Henry Weston Cardozo and Francis Lewis Cardozo, and two older sisters, Lydia Frances Cardozo and Eslander Cardozo. (Note: It's unclear whether there were other siblings. For example, one source said there was also a sister Lydia and a brother Jacob.)

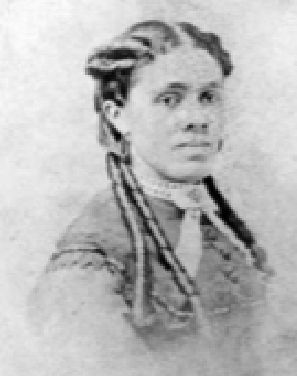
Lydia Weston, mother

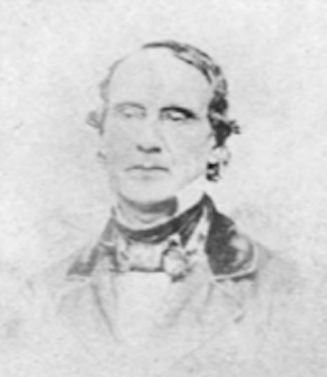
Isaac Cardozo, father

In Charleston, Thomas was among the "free-Negro elite" and went to private schools for free black children, mainly taught by free black teachers. He was also taught by his father Isaac and his uncle Jacob Cardozo, who was an economist and newspaper publisher.

The Fugitive Slave Act of 1850 and the secession movement caused free people of color to be concerned about being enslaved. When Isaac Cardozo died during this worsening time, Thomas's family lost their protector. Thomas was 17 at the time and became an apprentice in a company that manufactured rice-threshing machines, working with his eldest brother Henry.

In 1857, two years after his father's death, Thomas moved to New York where he continued his education. In June 1858, his mother, sisters, and brother Henry left Charleston on the steamship Nashville for New York; by 1860 they had settled in Cleveland, Ohio. His brother Francis was in school at the University of Glasgow in Scotland. At the Newburgh Collegiate Institute, a private boys school, Thomas took academic courses and trained to be a teacher. Before he could graduate, the Civil War broke out and he began teaching in 1861. He married Laura J. Williams, a teacher and accomplished musician who was from a mixed-race family in Brooklyn. Thomas and Laura became parents with a son, Alvin, born in 1863, and another son, Francis, in 1865.

== Career in education ==
Shortly after the beginning of the American Civil War, Cardozo began teaching in New York. A few years later in April 1865 at the end of the war, Thomas and his family moved from Flushing, New York, to his home town of Charleston, South Carolina.

In Charleston, in the challenging turmoil of the weeks following the end of the Civil War, he supervised the educational activities of the American Missionary Association (AMA). He obtained building space and books. He supervised teachers, hired new teachers, and ran the AMA house for teachers who came down from the north. All this was in the context of disputes between the various aid agencies there. Cardozo was the first AMA school principal in Charleston at the Tappan School.

A few months after he began work in Charleston, the AMA became aware of a previous affair that the married Thomas Cardozo had with a female student of his in New York. Also, the AMA was dissatisfied with his accounting of his expenditures back then and suspected that some of the expenditures went to the young woman. The AMA asked his brother Francis Cardozo to discuss this with him in Charleston. Francis reported back that Thomas had the affair through "weakness", had “not been deliberately wicked”, and didn't misappropriate any AMA funds. Thomas asked for forgiveness. In response, the AMA replaced Thomas with Francis around September 1865.

Thomas stayed in Charleston and became a grocer for a few months until his store burnt down. He moved to Baltimore, Maryland where he and his wife taught at the Negro Industrial School for a short time. When the school lost its funding in 1866, he and his family moved to Syracuse, New York. There, with the help of Samuel Joseph May, he raised funds for teaching in Elizabeth City, North Carolina, in a program of the New York Freedmen's Union Commission.

In the spring of 1869, the Cardozos moved to Elizabeth City, where Thomas and his wife taught for about four months until the program ended. They went back to the North to try to find support for their educational work in North Carolina. Cardozo brought with him a letter of commendation from North Carolina U. S. Senator John Pool that was endorsed by North Carolina Governor William Woods Holden and other state officials. After Cardozo gained the support of a branch of the Freedmen's Union Commission, he obtained a thousand dollars from the Freedmen's Bureau for construction of a normal school in Elizabeth City to train high school graduates to be teachers. It opened in the fall of 1870 with 123 students.

In January 1871, Thomas Cardozo and his family moved to Vicksburg, Mississippi, where he and his wife immediately began teaching. Several years later he served as State Superintendent of Education from 1874 to 1876. Cardozo proposed uniform textbooks for Mississippi schools during his tenure.

== Career in politics ==
"Whenever I sit to sketch the various members of the Legislature it kindles within me a warm feeling for the many good qualities and earnest friendship of all of them."

— Civis (Thomas Cardozo), March 24, 1873

In New York, Cardozo had written in 1868 and 1869 in the National Anti-Slavery Standard about the place for blacks in the evolving political situation of reconstruction. As a R1epublican, Cardozo ran for Sheriff of Pasquotank County, North Carolina, and lost on August 4, 1870. Five months later he moved to Vicksburg, Mississippi, in January 1871.

Since the large majority of voters in Mississippi were black with too few educated enough to provide political leadership, public office for Cardozo was a good possibility after satisfying the six-month residency requirement in July 1871. He joined the Republican Party, was elected circuit court clerk of Warren County and took office on January 1, 1872. He wrote accounts of his experiences in Mississippi, including descriptions of his fellow Republican politicians, for the New National Era under the pseudonym "Civis". (Note: See Further reading for some of Civis's writings.) He was a delegate to the 1873 National Civil Rights Convention in Washington, D.C.

In November 1873, Cardozo was elected State Superintendent of Education in Mississippi, along with the election of Governor Adelbert Ames, Lieutenant Governor Alexander K. Davis and Secretary of State James Hill. Although he was the first African-American to hold the post, Cardozo did not challenge the de facto racial segregation that existed in Mississippi schools. (Note: Using the pseudonym Civis in the New National Era, Cardozo advocated for a school desegregation clause to be in the federal Civil-Rights Bill.)

In August 1874, conservative whites took over the Vicksburg city government and Cardozo was charged with crimes while he was circuit court clerk in 1872. First he was charged with receiving money for falsified witness certificates and then additionally charged with embezzling money paid by land owners for redeeming land taken by the government for unpaid taxes. He appeared before a magistrate on September 7, 1874 and bond was posted. He was indicted in November 1874 and tried beginning May 6, 1875. The jury failed to reach a verdict. He was able to get the retrial moved from Vicksburg to Jackson with a new trial date in July 1876.

After the first trial, the ongoing political attacks by conservative whites against Republican office holders turned into violence. On July 4, 1875 in Vicksburg, a white mob attacked a meeting where Cardozo was to speak, followed by street violence where several blacks were killed or injured. City officials helped Cardozo, the main target of the attacks, escape from the city.

The occupying Army began to withdraw from the South in 1875 in the last years of the Reconstruction era. White Democrats had regained control of the Mississippi state legislature by a program of violence and intimidation against Republican black voters, known as the Mississippi Plan. The legislators brought impeachment charges against Superintendent Cardozo and the Senate impeachment trial began February 11, 1876. (Note: See Further reading for State Senate impeachment proceedings.) The most incriminating charge was that he embezzled money from Tougaloo University. Cardozo was granted permission to resign with the charges against him dismissed, and submitted his resignation on March 22, 1876. (Note: According to his biographer, Euline W. Brock, "Yearning for wealth and status, Cardozo capitalized on party weaknesses and eventually brought opprobrium on himself and his party.")

== Later years ==
Leaving the politics, an upcoming trial in Jackson in July 1876, and the dangerous situation in Mississippi, Cardozo moved to Newton, Massachusetts. There he worked for the postal service until his death from disease (Note: The disease was listed as albumenia in 1881 Massachusetts records, which corresponds to the modern term albuminuria. See Reference desk, February 8, 2021.) in 1881. He was forty-two. Thomas Cardozo Middle School in Jackson, Mississippi, of the Jackson Public School District, is named for him and opened in September 2010.

== See also ==
- List of African-American officeholders during Reconstruction
- Eslanda "Essie" Cardozo Goode Robeson
