= Gholson, Mississippi =

Unincorporated community in Mississippi, US

Gholson
- Unincorporated community
- Location within the state of Mississippi
- Coordinates: 32°56′11″N 88°44′02″W
- Country: United States
- State: Mississippi
- County: Noxubee
- Named for: Samuel J. Gholson
- Elevation: 558 ft (170 m)
- Time zone: UTC-6 (Central (CST))
  - Summer (DST): UTC-5 (CDT)
- GNIS feature ID: 670367

Gholson (formerly known as Meander) is an unincorporated community in Noxubee County, Mississippi. The community is southwest of Shuqualak.

== History ==
In 1900, Gholson had a population of 58 and two churches. A post office operated under the name Gholson from 1838 to 1976.

Gholson was once home to the Summerville Institute. The institute, founded by Thomas S. Gathright in 1854, was the only functioning secondary school in Mississippi during the Civil War. It was damaged by a fire in 1869 and rebuilt. The school continued to exist until it was again destroyed by fire in 1875.
