= Júnior Paulista (footballer, born 1981) =

Brazilian footballer

Personal information
- Full name: Luiz António Gaino Jr.
- Date of birth: 7 January 1981 (age 45)
- Place of birth: Jundiaí, Brazil
- Height: 1.87 m (6 ft 1 1/2 in)
- Position: Centre-back

Team information
- Current team: Santo André
- Number: 6

Senior career*
| Years | Team | Apps | (Gls) |
- Portuguesa
| 2003–2005 | Internacional | 5 | (0) |
| 2005 | Gama | 6 | (0) |
| 2006 | Rio Branco (SP) | 0 | (0) |
| 2006–2007 | Santo André | | |
| 2008 | União São João | 0 | (0) |
| 2008 | Mirassol | 0 | (0) |
| 2008–2009 | Feirense | 17 | (1) |
| 2010 | São José (SP) | 0 | (0) |
| 2010 | Vila Nova | 4 | (0) |
| 2010 | Marília | 3 | (0) |
| 2011 | Pelotas | 0 | (0) |
| 2012– | Santo André | 0 | (0) |
- * Club domestic league appearances and goals

Luiz António Gaino Jr., known as Júnior Paulista (literally Jr. from São Paulo state) (born 7 January 1981) is a Brazilian footballer who plays for Esporte Clube Santo André.

== Biography ==
Born in Jundiaí, São Paulo state, Júnior Paulista started his career at Portuguesa.

=== Internacional ===
He left for Rio Grande do Sul side Internacional in 2003. He did not play much for the team in nation-wise competitions but his namesake did (who known as just "Júnior" in although both from São Paulo state). He played 5 times in 2003 Série A, which the first three times were substitutes: on 19 July against Figueirense, on 24 July against Flamengo and on 2 August against São Paulo.

He finished as the losing semi-finalists of 2004 Copa FGF with Inter B. He played for Inter B in 2005 Campeonato Gaúcho Second Division.

=== Gama ===
He left for Federal District team Gama in May 2005, which he remained to refer as "Júnior Paulista" and his another namesake just known as "Júnior". He only played 6 games for Gama in 2005 Campeonato Brasileiro Série B; that season Gama finished as the 13th of the first stage.

=== São Paulo teams ===
On 1 January 2006 he signed a contract with Rio Branco Esporte Clube until the end of 2006 Campeonato Paulista Série A1. In April he left for Santo André until the end of 2006 Campeonato Brasileiro Série B, yet he still known as "Júnior Paulista" and another "Júnior" known as Júnior Costa. However, he only played the first 6 matches he possible to play (round 2 to 7) since his contract was received and recorded by BID-E system of CBF on 17 April. But in November, he signed a new 1-year contract with club.

In February 2008 he left for União São João until the end of 2008 Campeonato Paulista Série A2, but in February he was transferred to Mirassol of Campeonato Paulista Série A1.

=== Portugal ===
He was transferred to Portuguese Liga de Honra side Feirense in 2008–09 season.

=== Return to Brazil ===
In December 2009 he returned to Brazil, signed by São José Esporte Clube until the end of 2010 Campeonato Paulista Série A2. He was signed by Série B side Vila Nova in April but released in June. In July he was signed by Série C side Marília.

=== Pelotas ===
In January 2011 he was signed by Pelotas until the end of 2011 Campeonato Gaúcho, which he was presented on 16 January 2011 along with former Santo André teammate Makélelé. He made his debut on 6 February, replacing suspended Fernando Cardozo (another ex-teammate of Inter, suspended for third caution) as starting defender. Since then he played 7 more games and scored a goal (all in the second half of season, the "Taça Farroupilha", took the place of F.Cardozo). In April he signed a new 2-year contract with club.
