= Southern Quarterly Review =

19th-century American literary magazine

- Former editors: Daniel Kimball Whitaker, William Gilmore Simms; James Henley Thornwell
- Categories: Literature, History, Criticism
- Frequency: Quarterly
- Founder: Daniel Kimball Whitaker; James Ritchie
- First issue: January 1842
- Final issue: February 1857
- Country: United States
- Based in: New Orleans, Louisiana (1842–1843); Charleston, South Carolina (1843–1854); Baltimore, Maryland (1854–1855); Columbia, South Carolina (1856–1857)
- OCLC: 1586540

The Southern Quarterly Review (1842–1857) was an American literary magazine founded by Daniel Kimball Whitaker and James Ritchie in New Orleans, Louisiana. Within the first year the magazine publishing was moved to Charleston, South Carolina, followed moved to Baltimore, Maryland for one year in 1855, before its final move to Columbia, South Carolina. It was known for being pro-slavery.

== History ==
It was established by Daniel K. Whitaker and James Ritchie, both from Massachusetts. Established in New Orleans, it was relocated to Charleston during its first year. It continued there until 1854, relocated to Baltimore in 1855, and returned to South Carolina where it was published in Columbia from 1856 to 1857.

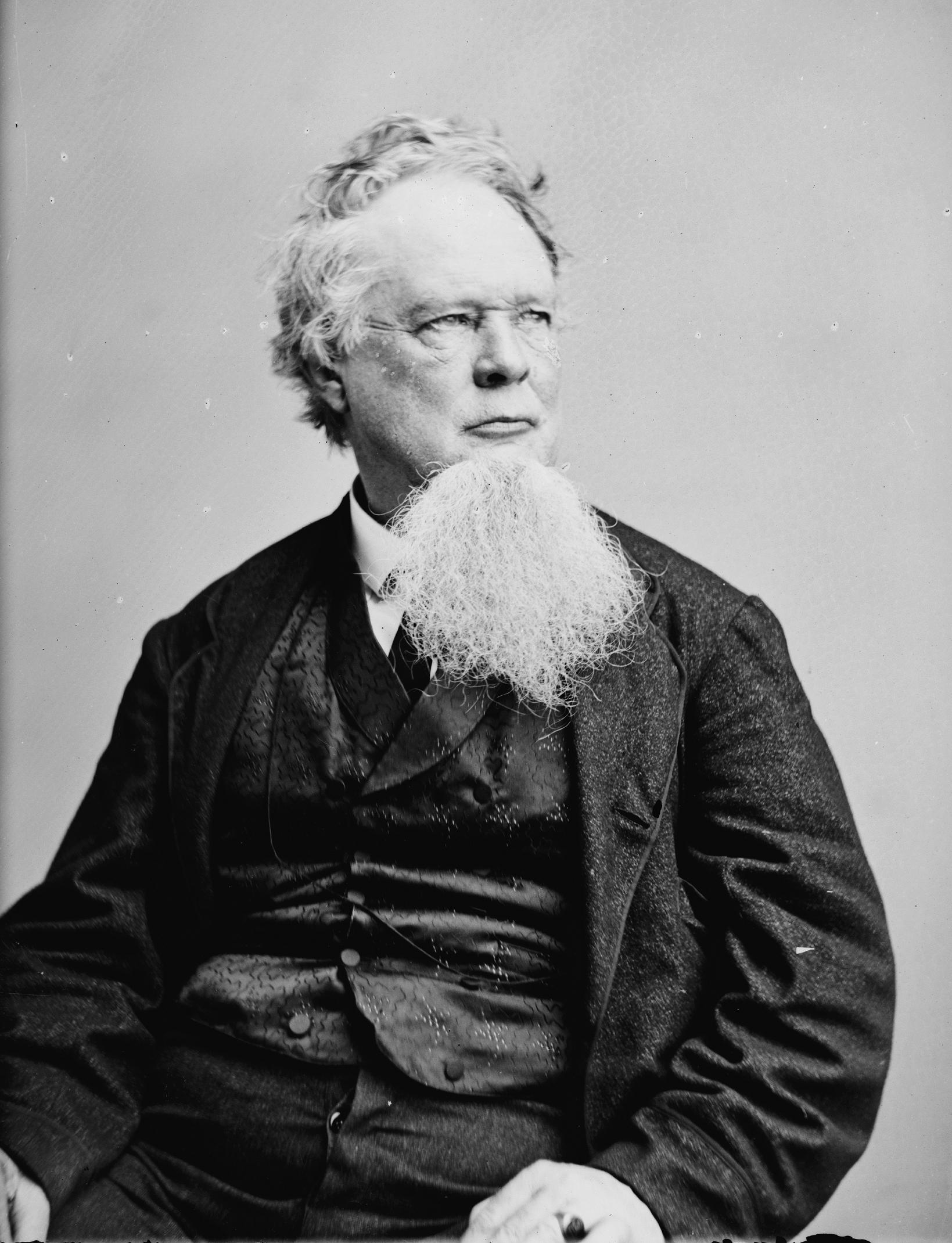
William Gilmore Simms

According to the South Carolina Encyclopedia, "it survived longer than any other important magazine except the Southern Literary Messenger." It advocated classicism in literature, agrarianism, was pro-slavery in economy, and Protestant in religion. It was antagonistic towards the French Revolution and transcendentalism, and opposed "British aggression" and "states' rights". The magazine notably published an opposition review of the book Uncle Tom's Cabin (1852) in July 1853 by editor William Gilmore Simms.

Editors included Daniel K. Whitaker from 1842–1847, a transplant from New England; and South Carolinian William Gilmore Simms from 1849–1854. George Frederick Holmes and Jacob Cardozo had articles published in it. Other contributors included William J. Grayson, Robert Barnwell Rhett, James Warley Miles, Frederick A. Porcher, Beverly Tucker, and J. D. B. De Bow.

== See also ==
- The Southern Review, a literary magazine established in 1935
- The Southern Quarterly, a publication of the University of Southern Mississippi established in 1962
- The Knickerbocker
