= The Sky's On Fire =

- Genre: Action; Sci-Fi
- Based on: Fatal Exposure by Michael Tobias
- Written by: Gar Anthony Haywood
- Teleplay by: Roderick Taylor; Bruce A. Taylor
- Directed by: Dan Lerner
- Starring: John Corbett; Josie Bissett; Bradley Whitford; Ben Browder
- Theme music composer: Jeff Eden Fair; Starr Parodi
- Country of origin: United States
- Original language: English

Production
- Executive producer: David Gerber
- Producer: Art Levinson
- Cinematography: Eric Van Haren Noman
- Editor: Paul Dixon
- Running time: 89 min.
- Production companies: All American Television; OTL Productions

Original release
- Network: ABC
- Release: July 15, 2000

The Sky's on Fire (AKA Countdown: The Sky's on Fire!) is a 2000 American television film featuring John Corbett as Dr. Evan Thorne, Josie Bissett as Jennifer Thorne, Ben Browder as Racer, Bradley Whitford as John Morgan and directed by Dan Lerner.

== Synopsis ==
A hole in the ozone layer has appeared over Los Angeles, causing all sorts of ecological disasters. Birds, whales, insects and people all succumb to the effects. Dr. Evan Thorne, who has been trying to alert the authorities to the looming disaster, finds it falls to him and his friends to save this small part of the planet from an environmental apocalypse.

== Reception ==
Jack Nicholls wrote in The Encyclopedia of Science Fiction, "A painfully low-budget disaster movie, Countdown: The Sky's on Fire has little to distinguish it except its lurid title. A hole in the ozone layer above the Pacific threatens to burn to death the population of the western United States. When this is discovered, a group of scientists, politicians, soldiers and journalists sit around and talk about fixing it while their womenfolk are threatened by insect swarms driven insane by the Sun's radiation. As the threat to humanity is invisible, and there was little money available to show its after-effects, the film is less a bad movie than a very dull one."

A reviewer for the site Disaster Movie World shared the opinion: "The Sky's on Fire is a treat if you're into bad movie physics, plot holes and logical inconsistencies in general. Forget the fact that Our Heroes can fly all the way up to the ozone hole without being burned while people down on the ground get baked to death — the most absurd part of all is the final resolution when the ozone hole is sealing itself up in a matter of seconds! While there's some potential in the various animal attacks, those scenes are all rather short and lack any real energy... While this film is nowhere near being 'good', and descends into the downright ludicrous during the final third or so, the silliness of it all is kind of enjoyable."
