= Cardoza =

Cardoza is a surname of Portuguese origin. It's also found in former Portuguese colonies within the Paravar community in Tamil Nadu, India.

== Notable people with this name ==
- Anthony Cardoza (1930–2015), American actor and film producer
- Avery Cardoza (born 1957), author and publisher
- Carlos Cardoza (born 1987), Puerto Rican baseball coach
- David Cardoza, English executive
- Dennis Cardoza (born 1959), American politician
- Laurie Cardoza-Moore (born 1962), American activist, film producer and television host
- Mervyn Cardoza (1922–2010), Pakistani Catholic, one-star general in the Pakistan Army
- Nora Cardoza (born 1983), Mexican boxer

== See also ==
- Cardozo, Spanish or Portuguese surname
- Cardoso, surname, modern form of Cardoza
