= Eleanor Cardozo =

British sculptor (born 1965)

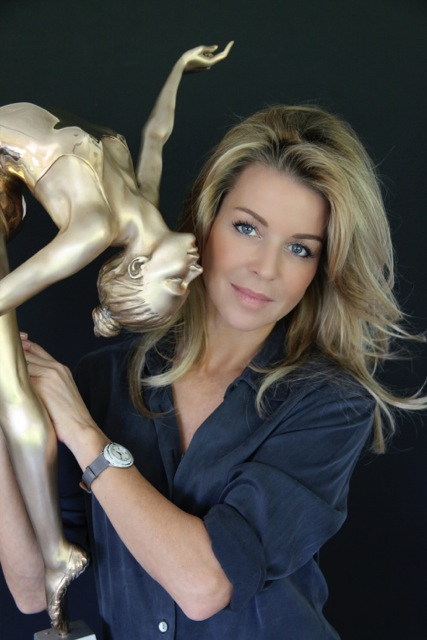
- Born: 1965 (age 60–61); London, United Kingdom
- Occupations: Artist, sculptor
- Notable work: Poise, Promise, Leap of Faith
- Website: eleanorcardozo.com

Eleanor Cardozo, also known as Ellie Fryer, is a British artist and sculptor based in Switzerland, most known for her bronze sculptures. In 2012, she made a set of five sculptures of gymnasts which were displayed in Britain during the Olympics.

== Early life and family background ==
Cardozo was born in London in 1965. The second of ten children, she was brought up in many different countries including Malaysia, Malawi, Ghana, Cyprus, Germany and Gibraltar where her father was posted as a Military Attaché. Cardozo attended St Mary's School in Shaftesbury with five of her sisters. Her mother taught violin and piano to all the children and her parents encouraged music and art at home.

Cardozo's grandmother was an artist at the Royal Academy and there were several painters in her father's family. She was interested in arts and drawing since her childhood, but when she was 15, her art master advised her to focus on sculpture as well as drawing. During her school life, she also trained in gymnastics and up till the age of 17 participated in county level gymnastic competitions.

== Education and training ==
Cardozo was trained in sculpture at the City and Guilds of London Art School and in portraiture at the Cecil Graves school in Florence. While still a student at the City and Guilds School of Art, she took portrait commissions from families at kindergartens and preparatory schools in the Knightsbridge and Belgravia areas of London to fund her college fees. She was also commissioned by Cartier while still at art college to produce a bronze polo player, which became their trophy for polo matches.

== Career ==
=== Artistic practice and technique ===
Cardozo works primarily in bronze and marble. Her process for bronze sculpture begins with clay modelling, after which the finished clay is cast into bronze in a foundry. She works with four different foundries located in England, Switzerland and Italy, each specialising respectively in monument casting, miniature casting, and life-size casting. A single bronze sculpture can take up to three months to complete. Her work focuses on the human form, with gymnasts and dancers as recurring subjects, a focus she has attributed in part to her own background as a competitive gymnast.

=== Early exhibitions and Olympic Museum, Lausanne (2009) ===
Her collection of Olympic gymnasts was first exhibited in November 2009 at the Museum of the Olympic Games in Lausanne, Switzerland.

=== Harrods and Beau-Rivage Palace exhibitions (2010) ===
In 2010, she displayed a number of works at Harrods, on the invitation of Mohamed Al-Fayed. The exhibition was very popular and was extended by a month. Later that year she displayed her work at the Beau-Rivage Palace hotel in Lausanne, next door to the Olympic Museum.

=== London 2012 Olympics ===
The International Olympic Committee suggested she include her work at the London 2012 Olympics. David Cameron encouraged her to work with LOCOG for the 2012 Cultural Olympiad but it was the Fine Art Expo Gallery at Heathrow Terminal 5 who commissioned her to make a three-metre gymnast, Promise, for the terminal concourse. It was dedicated to Frankie Jones, Team GB Rhythmic Gymnastics, who performed in front of the sculpture for the BBC in January 2012. Youth with a Mission subsequently commissioned a second three-metre public monument Poise for display outside Westminster Abbey and a collection of bronze gymnasts to be exhibited inside the Abbey. The Telegraph called her exhibition "one of the most inspiring and insightful Olympics-themed exhibitions taking place in London." Hampstead Theatre requested a solo exhibition of Cardozo's work, to coincide with their production of Chariots of Fire. For the duration of the 2012 Olympics and Paralympic Games, Cardozo's sculptures were on public display at Gatwick Airport, Heathrow T5, Kensington Palace Gardens, Bond Street and Westminster Abbey.

In 2012, Bedat & Co selected her as their ambassador and titled her "woman of calibre."

=== Post-Olympic commissions and exhibitions (2013 onwards) ===
In 2013 her monument sculptures were requested for public exhibition at Knightsbridge, at the Four Seasons Hotel London at Park Lane and at Wellington Barracks and in Berkley Square. Petra Ecclestone commissioned a full body bronze sculpture which was delivered to her in January 2013. Later that same year Cardozo made some sculptures for Cirque du Soleil and displayed her sculptures at the Henley Festival. She has been influenced by Michelangelo, Da Vinci and Donatello.

Over the course of her career, she has exhibited in St Tropez, Monaco, Paris, London and Dubai. Cardozo subsequently began collaborating with the International Federation of Gymnastics to create a monument for their headquarters in Lausanne, Switzerland. The Mandarin Oriental in Geneva holds ten of her sculptures, displayed one on each floor of the hotel's grand staircase.

=== Public sculptures and permanent installations ===
As of November 2012, Poise is standing in front of the Palais Wilson. It was bought by the owner of the President Wilson Hotel, Charles Tamman in 2012, who plans on keeping it there. Other locations where Poise has been placed include the Mandarin Oriental Hotel in London, and Nevil Holt Opera in Northamptonshire. A four-metre sculpture is also installed in Abu Dhabi, with additional works in Belgium and Luxembourg.

== Personal life ==
Cardozo is married and has three children. Her husband is a banker. They lived in London till 1998 and then moved to Switzerland.
