= Cardoso =

Cardoso may refer to:

- Cardoso (surname), a Portuguese surname
- Cardoso, São Paulo, municipality in the state of São Paulo, Brazil
- Guilherme "Bill" Cardoso, Brazilian-American entrepreneur, engineer, and scientist.
- Cardoso (footballer, born 1943), Joaquim Cardoso Neto, Brazilian football midfielder
- Cardoso (footballer, born 1984), Carlos Alexandre Cardos, Brazilian football defender
- Cardoso (footballer, born 1997), Johnatan Cardoso Dias, Brazilian football forward

== See also ==
- Cardozo (disambiguation)
