= Júnior Paulista (footballer, born 1978) =

Brazilian footballer

Personal information
- Full name: Fladimir Rufino Piazzi Júnior
- Date of birth: 30 October 1978 (age 48)
- Place of birth: São Paulo, Brazil
- Height: 1.80 m (5 ft 11 in)
- Position: Left back

Senior career*
Years	Team	Apps	(Gls)
2005	Botafogo (SP)	0	(0)
2005	Comercial (RP)	0	(0)
2006	Guaratinguetá	0	(0)
2006	União São João	0	(0)
2007	Guaratinguetá	0	(0)
2007	Caxias	2	(0)
2007	Ituano	4	(0)
2008	Central (PE)	5	(0)
2009	Monte Azul	0	(0)
2009	Guaratinguetá	8	(0)
2010–2011	Linense	0	(0)
2011	Grêmio Barueri	5	(1)
2012	Penapolense	11	(0)
- * Club domestic league appearances and goals

Fladimir Rufino Piazzi Júnior known as Júnior Paulista or just Júnior (born 30 January 1978) is a Brazilian former footballer.

== Biography ==
Júnior Paulista spent most of his career inside São Paulo state. In 2005, he was signed by Botafogo de Ribeirão Preto until the end of 2005 Campeonato Paulista Série A2. In August, he left for city rival Comercial (there is more than 1 team called Comercial inside São Paulo state) until the end of 2005 Copa Paulista de Futebol. The team finished as the losing semi-finalists.

In 2006, he left for Guaratinguetá, finished as the losing semi-finalists of Paulista Série A2 and promoted. He spent second half of year in União São João along with teammate Ricardo Vila, for 2006 Copa Paulista de Futebol. The team finished as the losing quarter-finalists.

He returned to Guaratinguetá in 2007 season, which he was an unused bench in the final of 2007 Campeonato Paulista do Interior. In June, he was signed by Caxias. (at that time just known as "Júnior") He played 2 games (round 2 & 3) in 2007 Campeonato Brasileiro Série C and the team failed to qualify to the next round. On 30 August he returned to São Paulo state, signed by Ituano until the end of 2007 Série B, just before the start of 2007 Copa FGF (eventually Caxias was the champion). Ituano finished as the least and relegated.

In January 2008 he signed a 1-year contract with Central Sport Club. That season he changed his artist name to "Júnior Paulista" (literally Jr. of São Paulo state) The team finished as the third of 2008 Campeonato Pernambucano and qualified to 2008 Campeonato Brasileiro Série C. He played 5 matches in Série C and was suspended once. He was sent off in round 4 (20 May). The team finished at the last of the Group 5 and failed to advance to the next stage.

In November 2008 he left for Monte Azul until the end of 2009 Paulista Série A2, rejoining Ricardo Vila (they shared the same agent "RS Soccer Business"). He was an unused bench in the final. In July, he was signed by Guaratinguetá for a third time.

The team finished as the losing semi-finalists of 2009 Campeonato Brasileiro Série C, and promoted to next season's Série B.

=== Linense ===
Júnior Paulista joined Linense in December 2009, rejoining Ricardo Vila for a third time, winning 2010 Campeonato Paulista Série A2. He renewed his contract in May until the end of 2010 Copa Paulista de Futebol, finished as the losing semi-finalists. In December 2010, he renewed his contract again. The team finished as the 14th.

== Honours ==
- Campeonato Paulista do Interior: 2007 (Guaratinguetá)
- Campeonato Paulista Série A2: 2009 (Monte Azul), 2010 (Linense)
