= Júnior Paulista (footballer, born 1977) =

Brazilian footballer

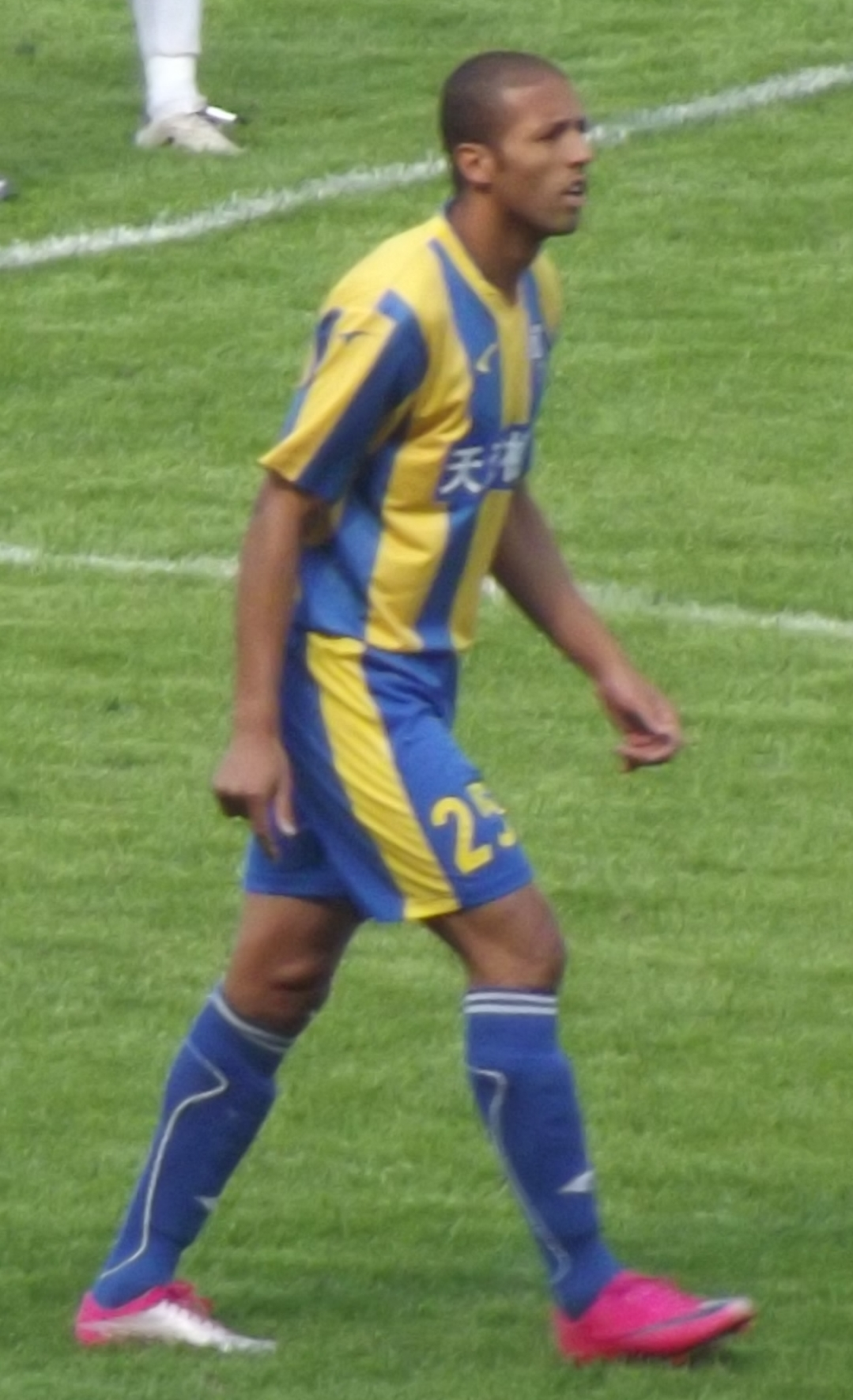

Personal information
- Full name: José Cristiano de Souza Jr.
- Date of birth: 11 August 1977 (age 49)
- Place of birth: São Paulo, Brazil
- Height: 1.83 m (6 ft 0 in)
- Position: Midfielder

Youth career
- Juventus (SP)

Senior career*
Years	Team	Apps	(Gls)
1997	Juventus (SP)		
1998	Guarani		
1999	Santa Cruz		
2000	Uralan Elista	0	(0)
2000	? (Qatar)		
2001–2005	Palmeiras	0	(0)
2001	→ Londrina (loan)		
2002	→ Figueirense (loan)	0	(0)
2002	→ Guarani (loan)	22	(1)
2003	→ Internacional (loan)	13	(0)
2004	→ Caxias (loan)	20	(2)
2005	→ União São João (loan)	0	(0)
2005	→ Vila Nova (loan)	3	(0)
2005	→ Pelotas (loan)	0	(0)
2006	Pogoń Szczecin	6	(0)
2006	Oriente Petrolero		
2007	Tupi	0	(0)
2007	Atlético (BA)	0	(0)
2007	Joinville	8	(0)
2008	São José (PA)	0	(0)
2008	Brasil de Pelotas	18	(0)
2009	São José (PA)	0	(0)
2009–2010	Shanghai Zobon	35	(6)
2011	Tianjin Songjiang	23	(3)
2012	Beijing Baxy	16	(0)
- * Club domestic league appearances and goals

José Cristiano de Souza Jr. (born 11 August 1977), known as Júnior Paulista is a Brazilian former professional footballer who played as a midfielder. He briefly played in Campeonato Brasileiro Série A and also played in Série B and Série C.

== Biography ==
Born in Indianópolis neighbourhood of São Paulo city, he started his professional career in Juventus (SP), at that time known as Juninho. He then played for Guarani and Santa Cruz. In 2000, he left for Russia and stayed in Qatar for 1 month.

=== Palmeiras ===
In November 2000 he was signed by Palmeiras as the club bought 50% rights and the other retained by investor. However, he was injured and he left for Londrina in 2001 season. In 2002, he signed a 6 months contract with Figueirense. He then returned to Guarani and made his Série A debut. In 2003, he left for Internacional, at that time already known as Júnior and teammate Luiz António Gaino Júnior known as "Júnior Paulista" instead, in although they both came from São Paulo state.

In 2004, he remained in Rio Grande do Sul, but for Caxias. He played 20 out of 23 Série B games of that season.

In January 2005 he left for fellow Campeonato Paulista team União São João, which the team relegated. In May, he extended his contract with Palmeiras to December 2005 and left for Vila Nova until the end of 2005 Série B, however he only played 3 times. After the team failed to qualify to stage two, he left for Pelotas in September, finished as the losing side of the second stage (round of 16) of 2005 Copa FGF.

=== Série C ===
In January 2006 he left for Polish side Pogoń Szczecin. After the end of 2005–06 Ekstraklasa he left for Bolivian side Oriente Petrolero.

He returned to Brazil in January 2007, signed a contract with Tupi until the end of 2007 Campeonato Mineiro. In April, he left for Atlético de Alagoinhas for 2007 Campeonato Baiano. In June, he was signed by Joinville until the end of 2007 Campeonato Brasileiro Série C.

He then returned to Rio Grande do Sul, played for São José de Porto Alegre in 2008 Campeonato Gaúcho. In June, he left for Brasil de Pelotas until the end of 2008 Campeonato Brasileiro Série C first stage, which he is known as Júnior Paulista at that time. He extended his contract in August. That season Brasil de Pelotas finished as the sixth.

In December, he returned to São José de Porto Alegre for 2009 Campeonato Gaúcho.

== Honours ==
- Campeonato Catarinense: 2002
- Campeonato Gaúcho: 2003
