= Jacob Cardozo =

American economist

Jacob Newton Cardozo (June 17, 1786 – August 30, 1873; né Jacob Nunez Cardozo) was an American political economist, statistician, newspaper editor, journalist, and publisher.

== Biography ==
Born Jacob Nunez Cardozo, he was the son of David Cardozo. He was born in Savannah, Georgia. Cardozo moved with his family to Charleston, South Carolina when he was 8 years old. He was a Sephardic Jew.

He edited and later owned The Southern Patriot newspaper. He became editor of The Southern Patriot in 1816 and became its sole proprietor in 1823. His book Notes on Political Economy was published in 1826. He advocated free trade. His book Reminiscences of Charleston was published in 1866. He sold The Southern Patriot newspaper in 1845 and established The Evening News, serving as its commerce editor.

He also wrote for the Southern Quarterly Review. Late in life he wrote for the Morning News in Savannah, but developed problems with his eyesight.

He died in Savannah. A book about him by Abram Cline Flora was published in 1949. Jacob N. Cardozo; Economic Thought in the Antebellum South by Melvin M. Leiman was published in 1966.

== See also ==
- Cardozo
