= Henry Cardozo =

American politician

The Reverend Henry Weston Cardozo
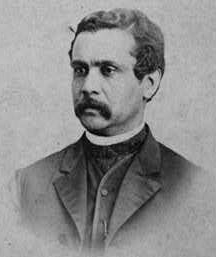

Member of the South Carolina Senate from Kershaw County
- In office November 22, 1870 – March 17, 1874
- Preceded by: Justus K. Jillson
- Succeeded by: Frank Carter

Personal details
- Born: September 1, 1830 Charleston, South Carolina, U.S.
- Died: February 21, 1886 (aged 55)
- Burial place: Randolph Cemetery, Columbia, South Carolina, U.S.
- Occupations: Auditor; carpenter; cobbler; machinist; minister; politician; shipwright; tailor
- Political party: Republican
- Spouse: Catherine F. McKinney (m. 1853)
- Children: 6
- Relatives: Francis Lewis Cardozo (brother); Thomas W. Cardozo (brother); Benjamin N. Cardozo (distant relative)

Henry Weston Cardozo (September 1, 1830 – February 21, 1886) was an American carpenter, cobbler, county auditor, shipwright, tailor, Methodist Episcopal minister, and Reconstruction era South Carolina state senator.

== Early life ==
Henry Weston Cardozo was born in September 1830. Cardozo's mother, Lydia Weston, was a former slave of African American and Native American ancestry. His father, Isaac Nunez Cardozo, was Sephardic Jewish of Portuguese descent. He was the eldest sibling and had two sisters, Lydia and Eslander. His younger brothers, Francis Lewis Cardozo and Thomas W. Cardozo, were educators and also became politicians during the Reconstruction era. Their father, Isaac Cardozo, died in 1855. Henry was working as a shoemaker by age 14. He also worked as a carpenter and shipbuilder. He apprenticed with a manufacturer of threshing machines.

In 1855, he married Catherine F. McKinney in Charleston, South Carolina. His sister Eslander married Catherine's brother Christopher McKinney. In June 1858, he and his family (wife, son, mother, two sisters, brother-in-law, mother-in-law, sister-in-law, nephew) left Charleston aboard the steamship Nashville on the way to New York. According to the 1860 census, his mother and sisters were living together in Cleveland, Ohio, and Henry worked as a tailor in that city while living with his wife and their sons Isaac (age 4) and William (age 1).

== Career ==
After the American Civil War ended in 1865, he moved back to South Carolina. He served as County Auditor of Charleston County and was elected to the state senate from Kershaw County, and assumed office on November 22, 1870. He also became a minister in the Methodist Episcopal Church and was later pastor of the Old Bethel United Methodist Church. He moved to Cincinnati, Ohio, and died on February 21, 1886.

He is buried in Randolph Cemetery with eight other Reconstruction era legislators.

Party political offices
Preceded by Unknown	Chairman of the Kershaw County Republican Party; 1868–1869	Succeeded by Unknown
Political offices
South Carolina Senate
Preceded by Justus K. Jillson	Member of the South Carolina Senate from Kershaw County; 1870-1874	Succeeded by Frank Carter
