= Ricardo Ramos (footballer) =

Brazilian footballer

Ricardo Vila
Personal information
- Full name: Ricardo Ramos
- Date of birth: 5 December 1980 (age 45)
- Place of birth: Taubaté, Brazil
- Height: 1.84 m (6 ft 1/2 in)
- Position: Centre-back

Team information
- Current team: Atlético Sorocaba

Senior career*
Years	Team	Apps	(Gls)
- ?
2003	Grêmio Barueri	0	(0)
2003–2004	Persebaya	25	(1)
2005	Guaratinguetá	0	(0)
2005	Oeste	0	(0)
2006	Guaratinguetá	0	(0)
2006	União São João	0	(0)
2007	Grêmio Barueri	1	(0)
2007	→ Roma de Apucarana (loan)	11	(0)
2008	São José (SP)	0	(0)
2009	Monte Azul	0	(0)
2009–2010	Linense	0	(0)
2011	Atlético Sorocaba	0	(0)
- * Club domestic league appearances and goals

Ricardo Ramos known as Ricardo Vila (born 5 December 1980) is a Brazilian footballer who plays for Atlético Sorocaba (as of April 2011).

He spent most of his career in the second division of São Paulo state, but also briefly played in national Série B and Série C in 2007 season.

== Biography ==
Born in Taubaté, São Paulo state, Ricardo Vila spent most of his career inside the state. He was transferred to Indonesian side Persebaya in 2004 and returned to Brazil a year later. He played for Guaratinguetá in 2005 Campeonato Paulista Série A2 and Oeste in 2005 Copa Paulista de Futebol, finished as the losing side in round of 16.

In 2006, he left for Guaratinguetá, finished as the losing semi-finalists of Paulista Série A2 and promoted. He spent second half of year in União São João along with former Guaratinguetá teammate Júnior Paulista, for 2006 Copa Paulista. The team finished as the losing quarter-finalists.

In 2007, he was signed by Grêmio Barueri in 1-year contract. After played once on 18 May, in June he was loaned to Paraná state football club Roma de Apucarana until the end of 2007 Série C. After Roma was eliminated in the second stage, he returned to Grêmio Barueri in September. He only missed one game (the last match of stage one) for Roma.

In 2008, he was signed by São José (SP). The team finished as the 9th in 2008 Paulista Série A2 and 19th in 2008 Copa Paulista.

In 2009, he was transferred to Monte Azul, rejoining Júnior Paulista. The team won 2009 Paulista Série A2 and promoted. He was transferred to Linense in July 2009. The team finished as losing quarter-finalists in the cup and winning 2010 Paulista Série A2 along with Júnior Paulista. He was released in May.

In November 2010 he joined Atlético Sorocaba until the end of 2011 Paulista Série A2.

== Honours ==
- Campeonato Paulista Série A2: 2009 (Monte Azul), 2010 (Linense)
