= Cardozo High School =

Cardozo High School can refer to:

- Benjamin N. Cardozo High School in New York City.
- Cardozo Education Campus, formerly Cardozo Senior High School in Washington, D.C.
