= Nate Cardozo =

American privacy and civil rights lawyer

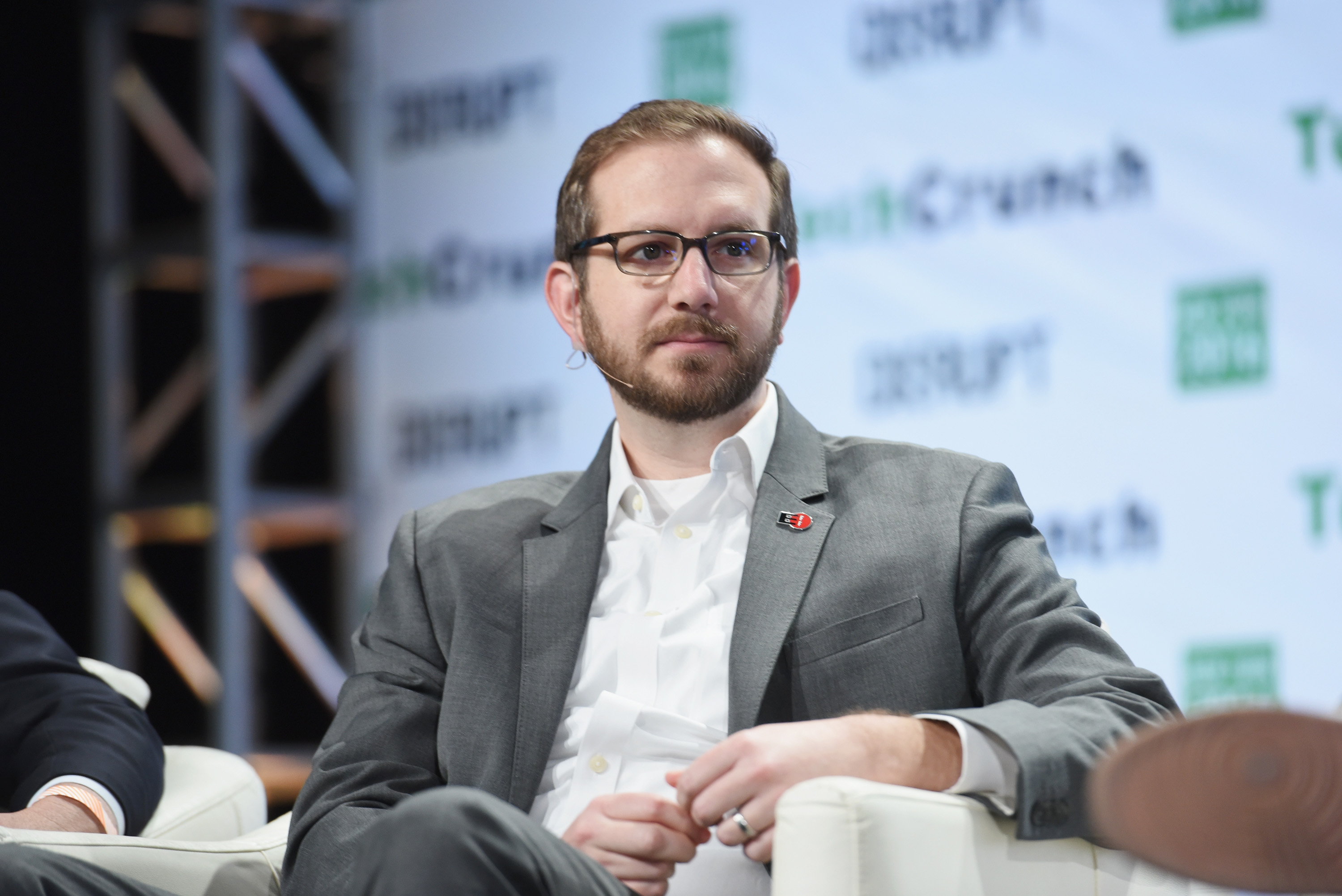
- Born: Nathan Cardozo
- Education: University of California Santa Cruz; University of California, Hastings

Nate Cardozo is an American privacy engineer and former privacy and civil rights lawyer. He spent much of his career as a staff attorney at the San Francisco-based Electronic Frontier Foundation (EFF), where his portfolio included cybersecurity, privacy litigation, and protecting coders' rights. His practice focused on encryption and information security.

In January 2019, Cardozo left EFF to join Facebook as the privacy policy manager of WhatsApp.

Then in July 2022, he left Facebook (by then known as Meta), and left the law entirely. He joined Google as a Senior Staff Privacy Engineer, working on end-to-end encryption on Android.

== See also ==
- Electronic Frontier Foundation
- Encryption
