= Fernando Cardozo (footballer, born 1979) =

Brazilian footballer

Personal information
- Full name: Fernando da Silva Cardozo
- Date of birth: 17 March 1979 (age 47)
- Place of birth: Pelotas, Brazil
- Height: 1.88 m (6 ft 2 in)
- Position: Defender

Youth career
- 1997–1999: Internacional

Senior career*
Years	Team	Apps	(Gls)
2000–2003	Internacional	18	(0)
2002	→ Juventude (loan)	0	(0)
2003–2008	Nacional	82	(1)
2008–2010	Marítimo	31	(0)
2010	→ Leixões (loan)	20	(0)
2011–2012	Pelotas	40	(1)
2013–2016	Brasil de Pelotas	60	(2)
2017	Esportivo		
- * Club domestic league appearances and goals

Fernando da Silva Cardozo (born 17 March 1979) is a Brazilian former footballer.

== Club career ==
Cardozo previously played for Internacional and Juventude in the Campeonato Brasileiro Série A. He also enjoyed a successful spell at Nacional for five seasons before signing for cross-town rivals Marítimo in the summer of 2008. On 14 January 2010 announced his club Maritimo the 30-year-old center back will play on loan for Leixoes S.C. until the end of the season.
