= Oscar H. Cooper =

American educator (1852–1932)

Oscar Henry Cooper (November 22, 1852 – August 22, 1932) was the President of Baylor University from 1899 to 1902, and of Simmons College, now known as Hardin-Simmons University from 1902 to 1909.

== Biography ==
Oscar Henry Cooper, often referred to as O.H. Cooper, was born in Panola County, Texas, on November 22, 1852, to Dr. William Henry and Katherine Hunter (née Rosser) Cooper. In 1865, Cooper left Texas to study at Marshall University. He was there for two years before transferring to Yale University, graduating first in his class with a Bachelor of Arts in 1872. Cooper began his work in the education field and taught at Woods Post Office near Panola, Texas, before serving as President of Henderson Male and Female College from 1873 to 1879. He taught at Sam Houston Normal Institute, now known as Sam Houston State University for two years before returning to Yale University in 1881 to serve as a tutor. He was a founding member of the Texas State Teachers Association and was involved in establishing the University of Texas in 1882. Cooper moved to Germany between 1884 and 1885 to complete graduate work at the University of Berlin.

Upon returning to the United States, Cooper taught at the secondary level as principal of Houston High School in Houston, Texas, from 1885 to 1886. He was also the Texas State Superintendent of Public Instruction, 1886-1890, and enacted several reforms creating standards across the board for high schools. He also served as superintendent of schools in Galveston, Texas, from 1890 to 1896 and improved the Galveston school system. Under Coopers's supervision, Galveston schools received the only gold medal for the American South at the Paris Exposition for best schoolwork. Cooper married Mary Brian Stewart on November 24, 1886, and had four children. The Cooper family moved from Galveston to Carthage in 1896.

Cooper, both a Baptist layman and renowned educator, served as President of Baylor University from 1899 to 1902. Baylor grew as a university under his watch. During this time, several departments were created and expanded, and Francis Lafayette Carroll and his son George Washington Carroll provided the largest donation at that time to higher education in Texas for a chapel, a library, and a science building. Cooper resigned from his position as president on March 31, 1902, due to student protest following an unusual occurrence. A few students attending chapel on the third floor of Carroll Library snuck a dog inside. When the dog began barking, an enraged Cooper hurled it out the third story window.

From Baylor, he moved on to the presidency of Simmons College, now known as Hardin-Simmons University from 1902 to 1909. Here, he headed a building program, improved the curriculum, secured James Simmons’ estate for the school, and doubled enrollment. In 1907, during his term at Simmons, Cooper also served on the board of the Conference for Education in Texas. In 1909, he established Cooper's Boys School in Abilene, Texas, and served as its principal until 1915. In 1921, he served as Chair of the State Educational Survey and was a one-term President of the Association of Texas Colleges in 1923. From 1928 to 1930, he taught history and philosophy of education at the University of Texas. Cooper was awarded an honorary doctoral degree each from Peabody College in 1891, Baylor University in 1914, and by Simmons College in 1925.

O. H. Cooper died on August 22, 1932, in Abilene, Texas.

== Bibliography ==
- The History of Our Country (1898)
