= Christopher Cardozo =

American author (1948–2021)

Christopher Cardozo (February 27, 1948 – February 21, 2021) was an American art collector, curator, photographer, author and publisher.

Cardozo’s Oaxaca series was first exhibited in 1971 at the Minneapolis Art Institution and later acquired by MOMA and other museums for their permanent collections.

He is known as an authority on the photography of Edward S. Curtis. He has written and edited nine monographs on Edward Curtis and his photography. In the past forty years, Cardozo has exhibited around the world, focusing on his goal to bring Edward Curtis to the world.

Cardozo was the founder and Board Chair of the Edward S. Curtis Foundation, which is dedicated to preserving and exhibiting the work of Edward Curtis. He started collecting Curtis' photographs in the 1970s, and had a large personal collection of the photographer's work, which he exhibited in travelling displays and at his gallery, Christopher Cardozo Fine Art.

== Bibliography ==
- Edward S. Curtis: One Hundred Masterworks (2015) Christopher Cardozo; Contributors Michael Tobias, Eric Jolly and A.D. Coleman
- Native Nations: First North Americans as Seen by Edward Curtis (1993) Christopher Cardozo; foreword by George Horse-Capture
- Chiefs and Warriors (Native Nations Series) (1996) Christopher Cardozo
- Great Plains (Native Nations Series) (1996) Christopher Cardozo
- Native Family (Native Nations Series) (1996) Christopher Cardozo
- Hidden Faces (Native Nations Series) (1996) Christopher Cardozo
- Sacred Legacy: Edward S. Curtis And The North American Indian (2000) Christopher Cardozo; foreword by Joseph Horse Capture and N. Scott Momaday
- Edward S. Curtis: The Great Warriors (2004) Christopher Cardozo; Contributors Hartman Lomawaima and Anne Makepeace
- Edward S. Curtis: The Women (2005) Christopher Cardozo; Contributors Louise Erdrich and Anne Makepeace
