= The Yemassee =

1835 novel by William Gilmore Simms

- First editions
- Author: William Gilmore Simms
- Language: English
- Publisher: Harper & Brothers
- Publication date: April 1835
- Publication place: United States
- Pages: Two vol. (1835 ed.)

The Yemassee: A Romance of Carolina is an 1835 historical novel by American writer William Gilmore Simms. It was a popular bestseller during its time and became Simms's best known novel.

== Overview ==
Simms had recently published his book Guy Rivers and its success convinced him that writings on American themes could be effective. His first reference to the book that became The Yemassee came in a letter dated July 19, 1834, in which he wrote that he was "digesting the plan of an Indian tale—a story of an early settlement and of an old tribe in Carolina".

Influenced by the historical romances by Sir Walter Scott, the book's plot is set in the low country of South Carolina before and during the Yemassee War in 1715-1717. It was released in April 1835 to positive critical reviews. The New York Times, for example, wrote of the reviewer's "extreme delight" in the book which "permanently established" a reputation for the author. The Baltimore American wrote that the book put Simms "among the first class of modern novelists".
