= Francis Lewis Cardozo =

American clergyman and politician (1836–1903)

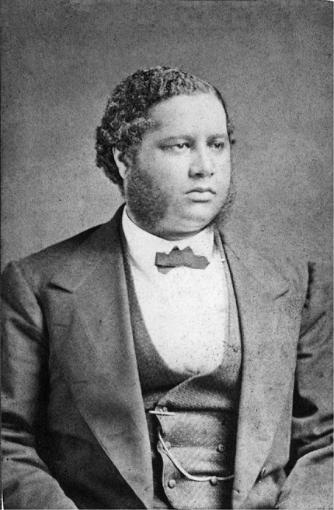
- Portrait of Cardozo, c. 1870

23rd Secretary of State of South Carolina
- In office 1868–1872
- Governor: Robert Kingston Scott
- Preceded by: Ellison Capers
- Succeeded by: Henry E. Hayne

South Carolina Treasurer
- In office August 1, 1872 – May 1, 1877
- Governor: Robert Kingston Scott; Franklin J. Moses Jr. Daniel Henry Chamberlain; Wade Hampton III
- Preceded by: Niles G. Parker
- Succeeded by: Sherob Luther Leaphart

Personal details
- Born: February 1, 1836 Charleston, South Carolina, U.S.
- Died: July 22, 1903 (aged 67)
- Party: Republican
- Spouse: Catherine Romena Howell (m. 1864)
- Children: 7
- Relatives: Henry Weston Cardozo (brother); Thomas Whitmarsh Cardozo (brother); Eslanda Goode Robeson (granddaughter); Benjamin N. Cardozo (distant relative)
- Education: University of Glasgow
- Profession: Clergyman, politician, educator

Francis Lewis Cardozo (January 1, 1837– July 22, 1903) was an American clergyman, politician, and educator. When elected in South Carolina as Secretary of State in 1868, he was the first African American to hold a statewide office in the United States.

Born free during the time of slavery in Charleston, South Carolina to a mother who was a free woman of color, and a Sephardic Jewish father, Francis Cardozo studied at University of Glasgow and later at seminary. He served as a minister in New Haven, Connecticut, before returning to South Carolina in 1865 with the American Missionary Association to establish schools for freedmen after the American Civil War.

After working in South Carolina during Reconstruction, Cardozo received an appointment in 1878 at the U.S. Department of Treasury in Washington, D.C. Later he served twelve years as principal of a major public high school, was an advocate for school integration and lived in the nation's capital for the rest of his life.

== Early life ==
Francis Cardozo was born free in 1836 in Charleston as the second of four sons of Lydia Williams Weston, a free woman of color, and Isaac Nunez Cardozo, a Sephardic Jewish man of Portuguese descent who had a position at the US Customhouse in the port city. The children were born free because their mother was free. His parents had a common-law marriage, as state law prevented interracial marriage. Francis had two sisters, Lydia and Eslander, an older brother, Henry Weston Cardozo, and two younger brothers, Jacob Edward Cardozo (later Moseman), and Thomas Whitmarsh Cardozo. Their father arranged for the boys to attend a private school open to free people of color.

Isaac died in 1855, disrupting the stability and economic safety of the family.

Francis Cardozo went to Scotland for higher education. In 1858, he enrolled at the University of Glasgow. Later, he attended seminaries in Edinburgh and London. He was ordained a Presbyterian minister.

After returning to the United States in 1864, Francis Cardozo became pastor of the Temple Street Congregational Church in New Haven, Connecticut. On December 20, 1864, he married Catherine Romena (a.k.a. Minnie) Howell, a stepdaughter of the Rev. Amos Beman, noted abolitionist and former pastor of the same Temple Street Church. Francis and Minnie had seven children through their marriage; two died young, leaving four sons and a daughter.

== Return to South Carolina, 1865 ==
In 1865, Francis Cardozo returned to Charleston as an agent of the American Missionary Association (AMA). He succeeded his younger brother, Thomas Cardozo, as superintendent of an AMA school. The AMA established both primary schools and colleges for freedmen in the South in the post-Civil War years.

Cardozo developed this school as the Avery Normal Institute, one of the first free secondary schools for African Americans. It was established to train teachers, as freedmen sought education for their children and themselves as one of their highest priorities. In the 21st century, the Avery Institute has been incorporated as part of the College of Charleston.

== Political career ==
Francis Cardozo became active in the Republican Party in South Carolina and was elected as a delegate to the 1868 South Carolina constitutional convention. As chair of the education committee, he advocated establishing integrated public schools in the state. The legislature ratified a new constitution in 1868 that provided for public schools for the first time in the state and supported them to be integrated.

He was elected Secretary of State in South Carolina in 1868 and was the first African American to hold a statewide office in the United States. Cardozo reformed the South Carolina Land Commission, which distributed limited amounts of land to former slaves. During his term as secretary of state, he was chosen as professor of Latin at Howard University in Washington, D.C., and advised the governor of his intention to resign. The governor helped approve an arrangement by which Cardozo could retain his state office and also teach at Howard. A deputy was appointed during this period. He taught at Howard until March 1872.

Francis Cardozo was elected as state treasurer in 1872. After he did not cooperate with corruption, some Democratic legislators unsuccessfully tried to impeach Cardozo in 1874. He was reelected in 1874 and 1876, although the latter election was one in which Democrats swept most offices and took over control of the state legislature and governor's seat.

South Carolina elections, as in other southern states, had been increasingly marked by violence as Democrats sought to suppress the black Republican vote. The 1876 gubernatorial election season was also violent and featured widespread fraud at the polls and disputes over counts. In the end, white Democrats regained control of the state government after a compromise at the national level in 1877 led to the federal government abandoning Reconstruction. This included the removal of remaining federal troops from the South that year and other steps, including supporting Democrat Wade Hampton III's claim for the governorship in a disputed election. As customary in a change of administrations, Hampton demanded the resignation of Cardozo and other members of the earlier government; Francis left office on May 1, 1877.

The Hampton administration and the Democrats prosecuted Cardozo for "conspiracy to defraud the state" in November 1877. Many former government officials were indicted for corruption charges and fled the state, Cardozo was one of three that remained and was soon arrested and convicted in "connection of a 'pay certificate' worth $4,000, drawn to the order of C. L. Frankfort and paid by Cardozo." Cardozo's appeal to the South Carolina Supreme Court was dismissed. Despite questionable evidence, he was found guilty and served over six months in jail. After the federal government dropped election fraud charges against some Democrats, Cardozo was pardoned in 1879 by Democratic Governor William Dunlap Simpson.

In 1878 Cardozo was appointed to a Washington, D.C., position in the Treasury Department under Secretary John Sherman. He served in that position for six years, during which time he worked on education policy for the city of Washington. It was administered by the federal government

== Educator ==
In 1884, Francis Cardozo returned to education as a principal of the Colored Preparatory High School in Washington, DC. He was featured in a column of the July 10, 1886, issue of the Cleveland Gazette, advocating for integrated schools in a discussion on the "mixed schools question":

Why advocate mixed schools? Because they are right. Why oppose separate schools? Because, being based on a system of oppression, injustice and discrimination they are radically wrong, and should not be backed by enlightened Christian sentiment. We choose separate schools per se, rather than be without schools at all; but to advocate a system of distinction on men simply on account of color or unnatural accidents, is not only a moral evil, but oppression against the common brotherhood.

— Francis Lewis Cardozo, Cleveland Gazette (July 10, 1886)

He introduced a business curriculum and made it a leading school for African Americans. He served as principal until 1896.

Cardozo was a distant relative of future United States Supreme Court Justice Benjamin N. Cardozo, who was born in New York of another branch of the family. Francis's granddaughter, Eslanda Cardozo Goode, studied chemistry in college and was an anthropologist, author, actor and civil rights activist. She married renowned singer and political activist Paul Robeson.

== Legacy and honors ==
In 1928, the Department of Business Practice was reorganized as a high school in Northwest Washington, D.C. It was named Cardozo Senior High School in Francis Cardozo's honor.

== In popular culture ==
In the 1994 historical drama North and South, Book III, Francis Cardozo was portrayed by actor Billy Dee Williams.

== See also ==
- List of Afro-Latinos
