= Ada Simond =

American community leader (1903–1989)

Ada Marie DeBlanc Simond
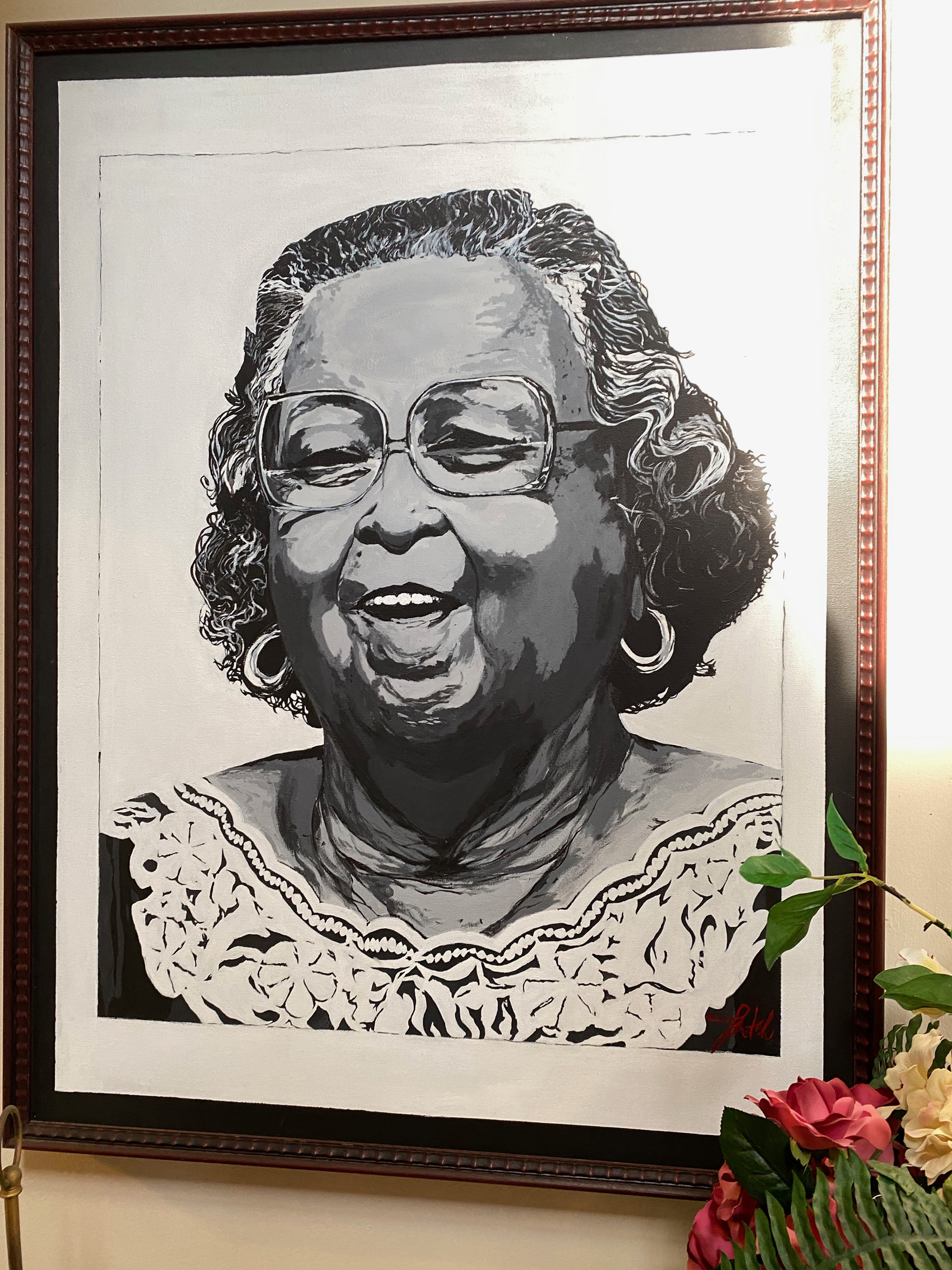
- Ada Simond depicted in artwork
- Born: November 14, 1903; Iberia Parish, Louisiana, U.S.
- Died: October 23, 1989 (aged 85); Austin, Texas, U.S.
- Education: Tillotson College (BS); Iowa State University (MS)
- Occupations: Public health activist, historian, educator, and writer
- Relatives: Gilbert Askey (son); Damita Jo DeBlanc (niece); Connie Yerwood Connor (stepdaughter); Joyce Yerwood (stepdaughter)

Ada Simond (November 14, 1903 – October 23, 1989) was an American public health activist, historian, educator, and writer considered a community leader for her contributions to public health and African-American historical education. She was named to the Texas Women's Hall of Fame in 1986.

== Early life and education ==
Simond was born in Iberia Parish, Louisiana, in 1903. She is descended from French explorer Louis Juchereau de St. Denis. Her family ran a farm, raising rice, soybeans, and sugarcane.

In 1914, her family moved to Austin, Texas. She was only able to attend one semester of high-school but supplemented her learning by borrowing books from L. C. Anderson, who later went on to found the Colored Teachers State Association of Texas. Simond recalls that the Black children in Austin's segregated schools often relied on "old books discarded by white schools".

In 1922, Simond married Aubrey Askey. Their son, Gilbert Askey, became an arranger, composer, and producer for Motown Records. Their niece, Damita Jo DeBlanc, became an actress, comedian, and singer. Ada and Aubrey divorced in 1927.

In 1929, Simond married Charles Yerwood, a physician in Austin. Simond became stepmother to his two daughters: Connie Yerwood Connor, who became the first Black doctor to serve on the Texas Department of Health and Joyce Yerwood, who became the first female African American physician in Fairfield County, Connecticut.

In 1934, Simond earned her Bachelor of Science in Family Lie Education from Tillotson College. In 1936, she earned her Master of Science from Iowa State University.

In 1982, she was awarded a Doctor of Humane Letters from Huston-Tillotson College.

== Career ==
In 1942, Simond became a public health representative for the Texas Tuberculosis Association, traveling across the state to educate impoverished Texans about proper sanitation and other factors needed to combat tuberculosis. She served in this capacity for 25 years, and cites her efforts in training volunteers as one of her major contributions: "I was able to convince people that helping those less fortunate than themselves transcended financial gain. I left little armies of volunteers everywhere I went." Simond later helped to open a library in East Austin, where most African-Americans lived at that time.

In 1967, Simond reached the mandatory retirement age of 65 at the Texas Tuberculosis Association. She found a similar job at the Texas State Department of Health until being forced to retire again in 1973, when she reached their mandatory retirement age of 70. From 1974 to 1977, Simond worked as a bailiff in the Fifty-Third district in Travis County, Texas.

Starting in 1977, Simond published a series of 6 children's book which explored the African-American experience in Austin. The books are narrated by a character named Mae Dee Lewis, whom Simond based on a childhood friend. Simond cites a desire to help children who were learning to cope with newly integrated Texan schools at the time.

In 1979 she co-founded the W. H. Passon Historical Society to help preserve and promote Black history in Austin. In 1980, she co-founded the George Washington Carver Museum which is located in a historical building that was originally the site of Austin's first Black library.

== Death and legacy ==
Simond died in Austin on October 23, 1989.

Simond has been called a "pioneer" among African-American women writers and has been described as having a "marvelous penchant" for history in Austin.

=== Awards and honors ===
- In 1973, Simond received the Women in Communications, Inc, Banner Brunch award for her work with health and poverty
- In 1980, Simond received a distinguished service award from Austin mayor Carole McClellan
- In 1982, the Black Arts Alliance awarded Simond the Mattie B. White award for her accomplishments
- In 1983, the city of Austin declared November 16 as "Ada Simond Day"
- In 1986, Simond was inducted into the Texas Women's Hall of Fame
- In 1986, Simond received the Public Citizen of 1986 award from the National Association of Social Workers
- In 2021, a tributary in Texas originally called Negro Branch was renamed Ada Simond Creek in her honor

She has also received the Black Heritage Award from the Austin Independent School District and the Human Relations Award from the Texas State Teachers Association.

== Bibliography ==
- Let's pretend : Mae Dee and her family go to town : the first in a series of stories (1977, with Sarochin Shannon)
- Let's pretend : Mae Dee and her family on a weekend in May : the second in a series of stories (1977, with Sarochin Shannon)
- Let's pretend : Mae Dee and her family join the Juneteenth celebration : the third in a series of stories (1978, with Sarochin Shannon)
- Let's pretend : Mae Dee and her family in the merry, merry season (1978, with Sarochin Shannon)
- Let's pretend : Mae Dee and her family and the first wedding of the year : the fifth in a series of stories (1979, with Sarochin Shannon)
- Let's pretend : Mae Dee and her family ten years later : the sixth and last in a series of stories (1980, with Sarochin Shannon)
- Looking back : a Black focus on Austin's heritage (1983)

== See also ==
- Southgate–Lewis House
