= Southgate–Lewis House =

Historic house in Austin, Texas, United States

- U.S. National Register of Historic Places
- Recorded Texas Historic Landmark
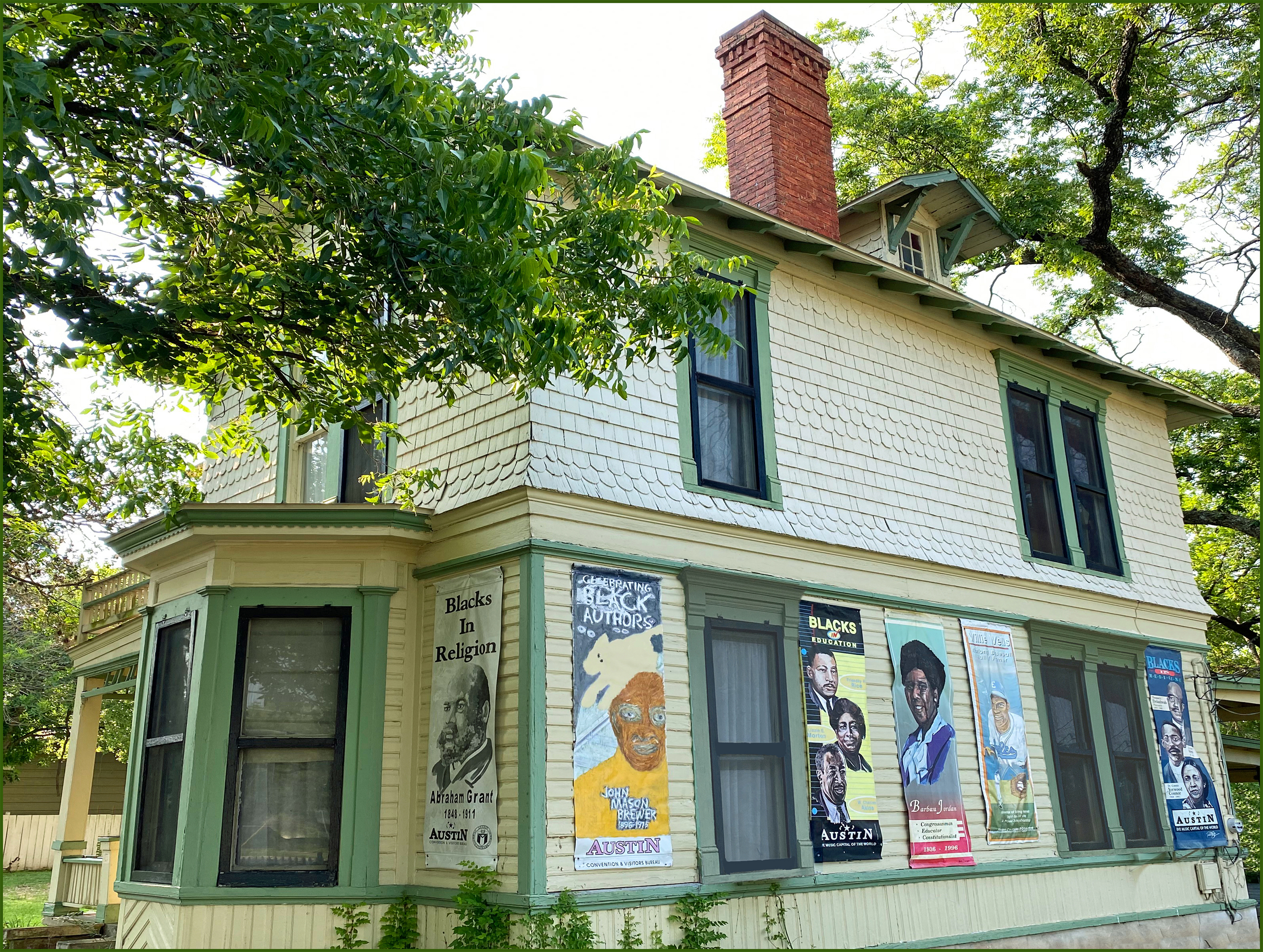
- Southgate–Lewis House in June 2021

- Location within Texas Location within the United States
- Location: 1501 East 12th Street; Austin, Texas, United States
- Coordinates: 30°16′23″N 97°43′25″W
- Built: 1888
- Architect: R. C. Lambie
- Architectural style: Victorian
- NRHP reference No.: 85002265
- RTHL No.: 15230

Significant dates
- Added to NRHP: September 17, 1985
- Designated RTHL: 1988

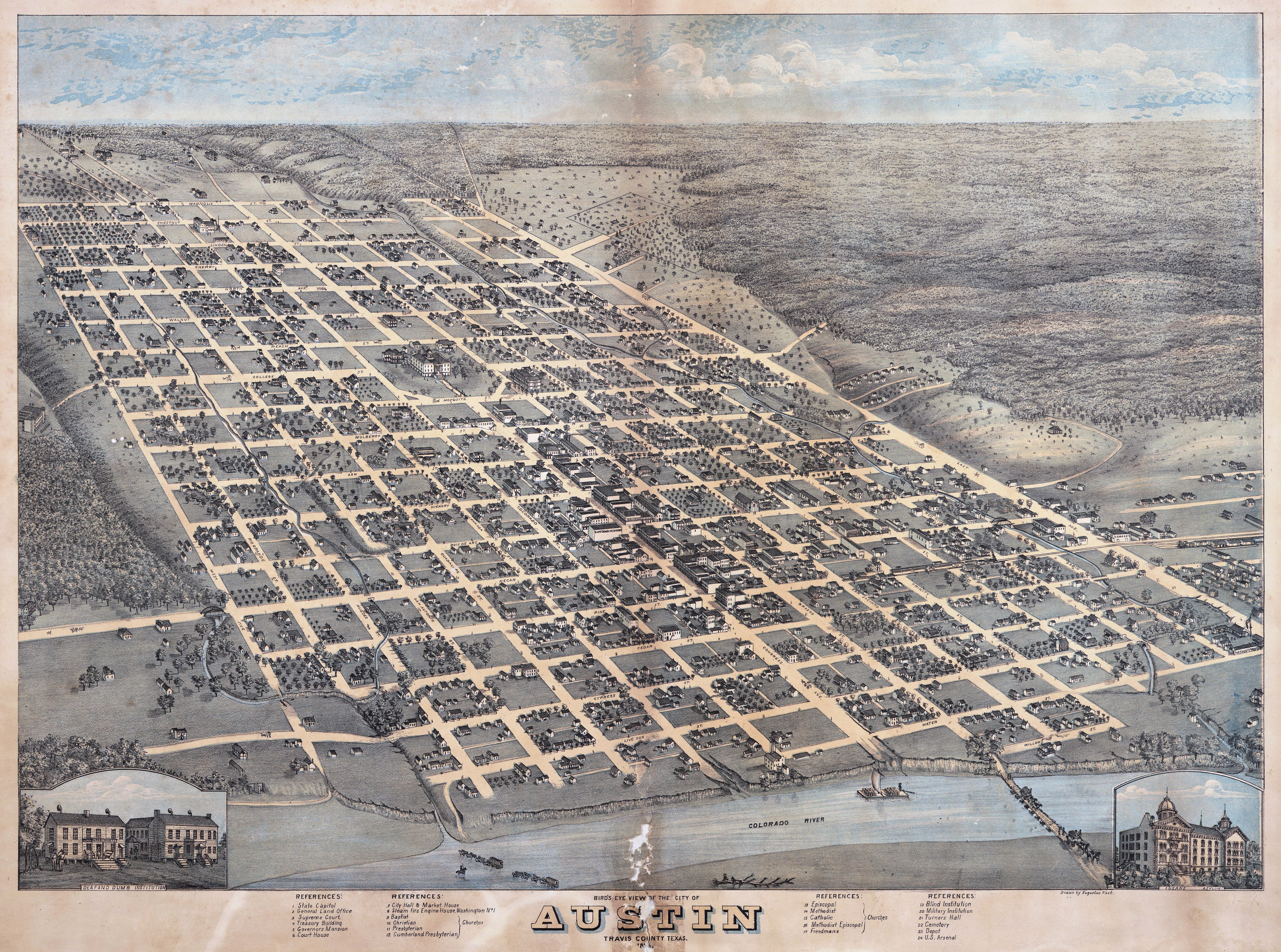
"Bird's Eye View of the City of Austin", 1873

The Southgate–Lewis House is a historic residence in Austin, Texas, located near the Texas State Capitol. Built in 1888 by builder and architect Robert C. Lambie, the house was originally constructed for bookbinder and printer John Southgate and was later acquired by businessman Charles Lewis in 1913.

The property is located within the Six Square District, formerly known as the African American Cultural Heritage District. It has been designated a City of Austin landmark, listed on the National Register of Historic Places, and recognized as a Recorded Texas Historic Landmark.

Since 1986, the house has been owned by the W. H. Passon Historical Society, which maintains the property and preserves materials related to African American history in Austin and Travis County, Texas.

== Landmark status designation and recognition timeline ==
- 1979 – Designated a City of Austin landmark
- 1980 – Awarded the Heritage Society of Austin Historic Preservation Award
- 1985 – Designated a landmark by the National Register of Historic Places
- 1987 – Recognized by the State of Texas 70th Legislature, Resolution No. 141, for ensuring the legacy of Black heritage in Austin
- 1987 – Awarded the "Helping Hands Award for Community Service" by the Texas Association for the Study of Afro-American Life and History
- 1988 – Designated a Recorded Texas Historic Landmark

== Description ==
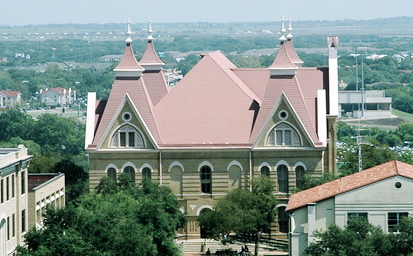
The Old Main in San Marcos, constructed by R. C. Lambie.

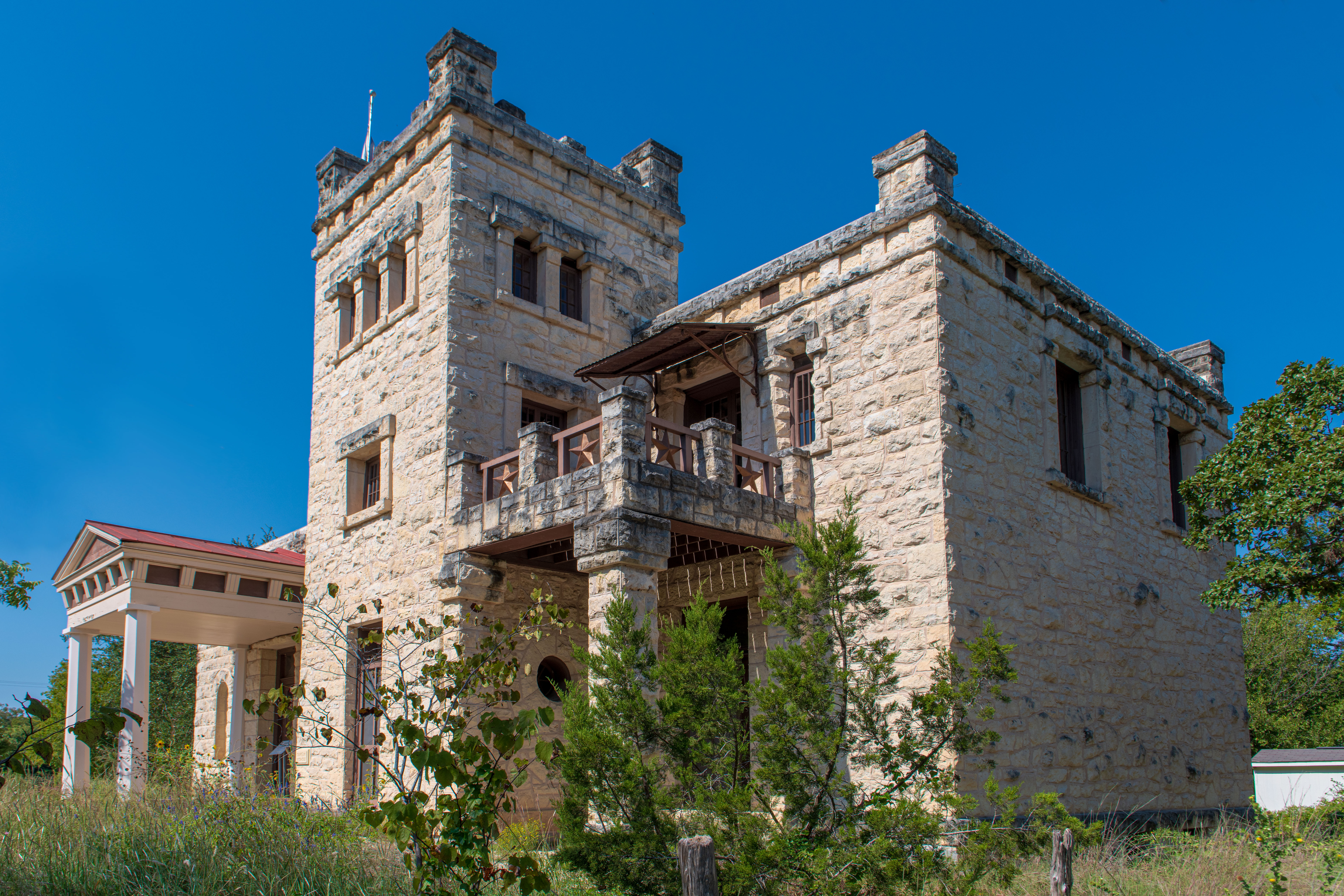
The Elisabet Ney Museum, constructed by R. C. Lambie.

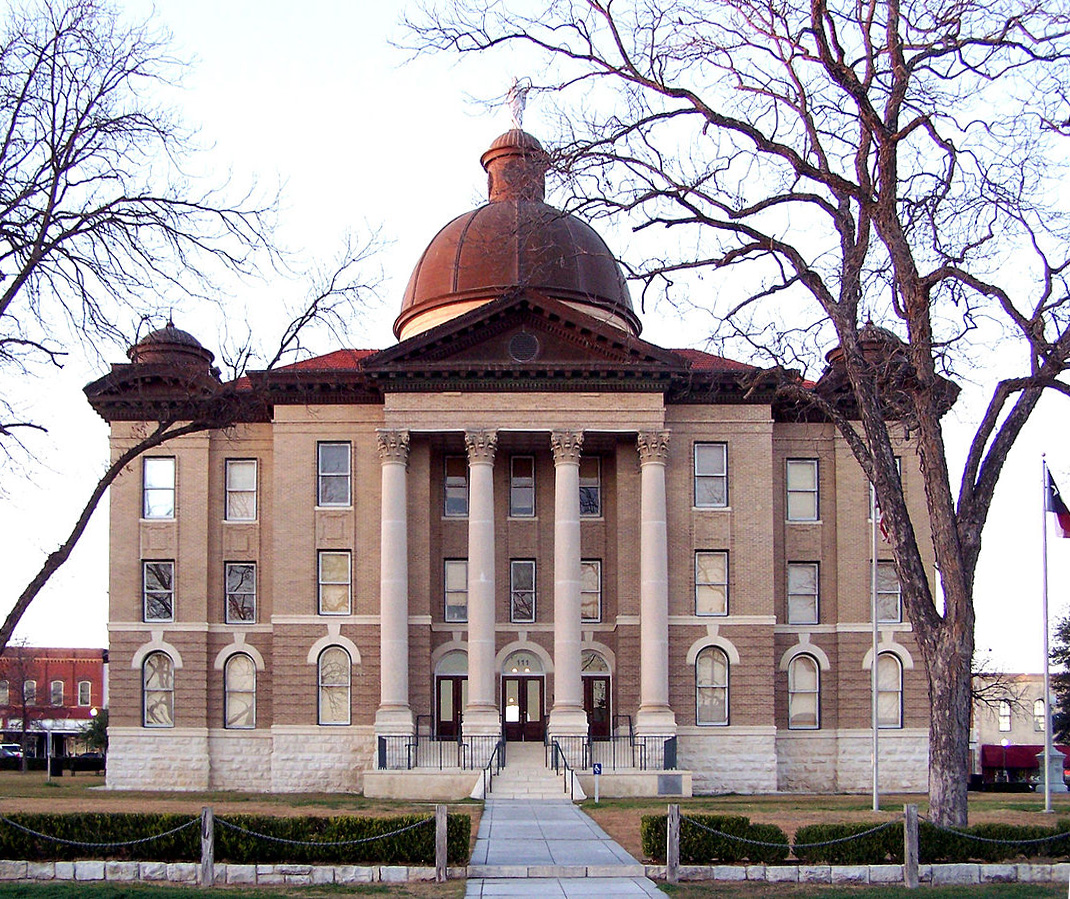
R.C. Lambie constructed the Hays County Courthouse. It was built in the Classical Revival style in 1908.

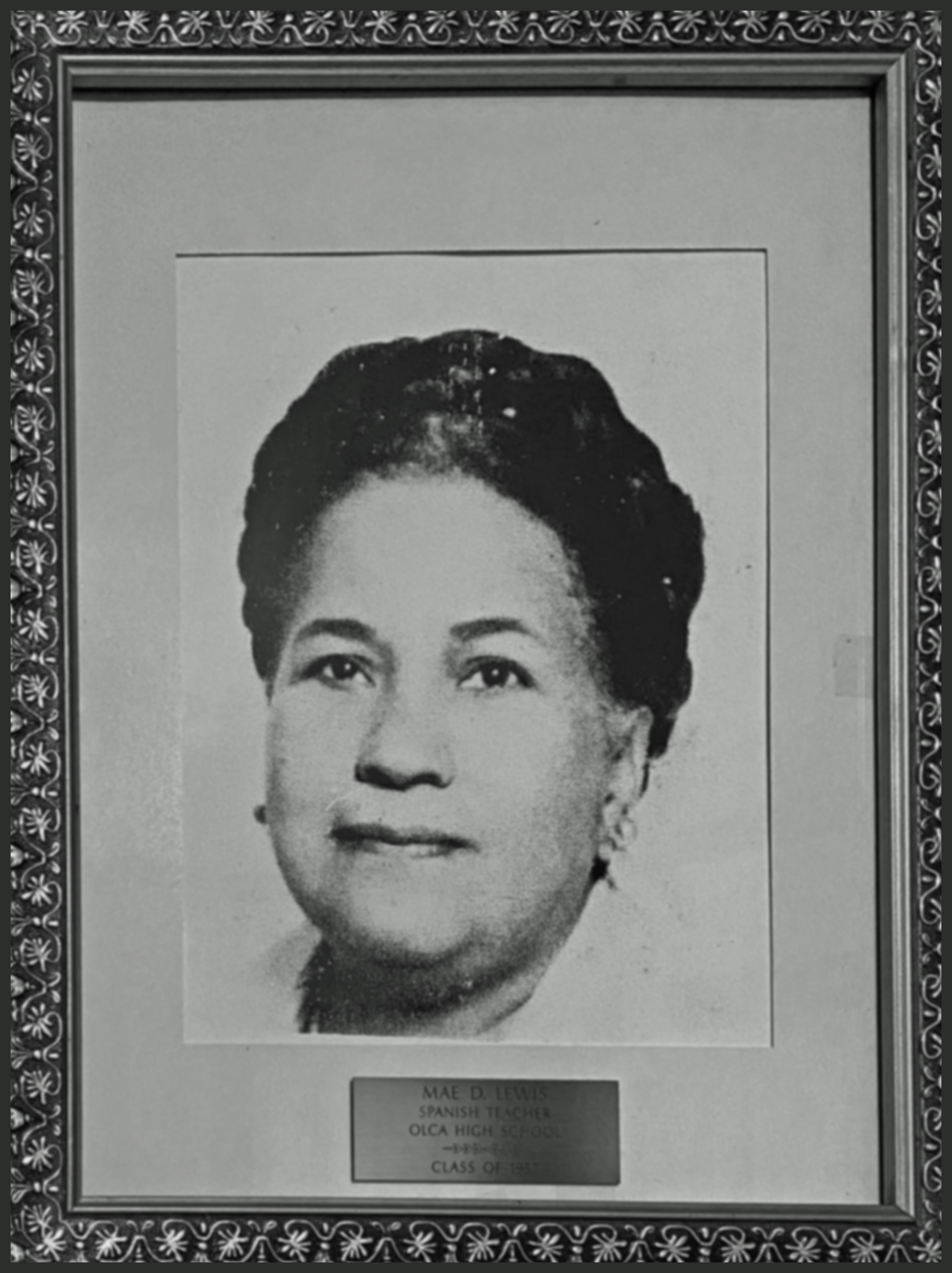
Photograph of Marguerite Mae Dee Lewis, the daughter of Charles M. Lewis, owners of the Southgate–Lewis House

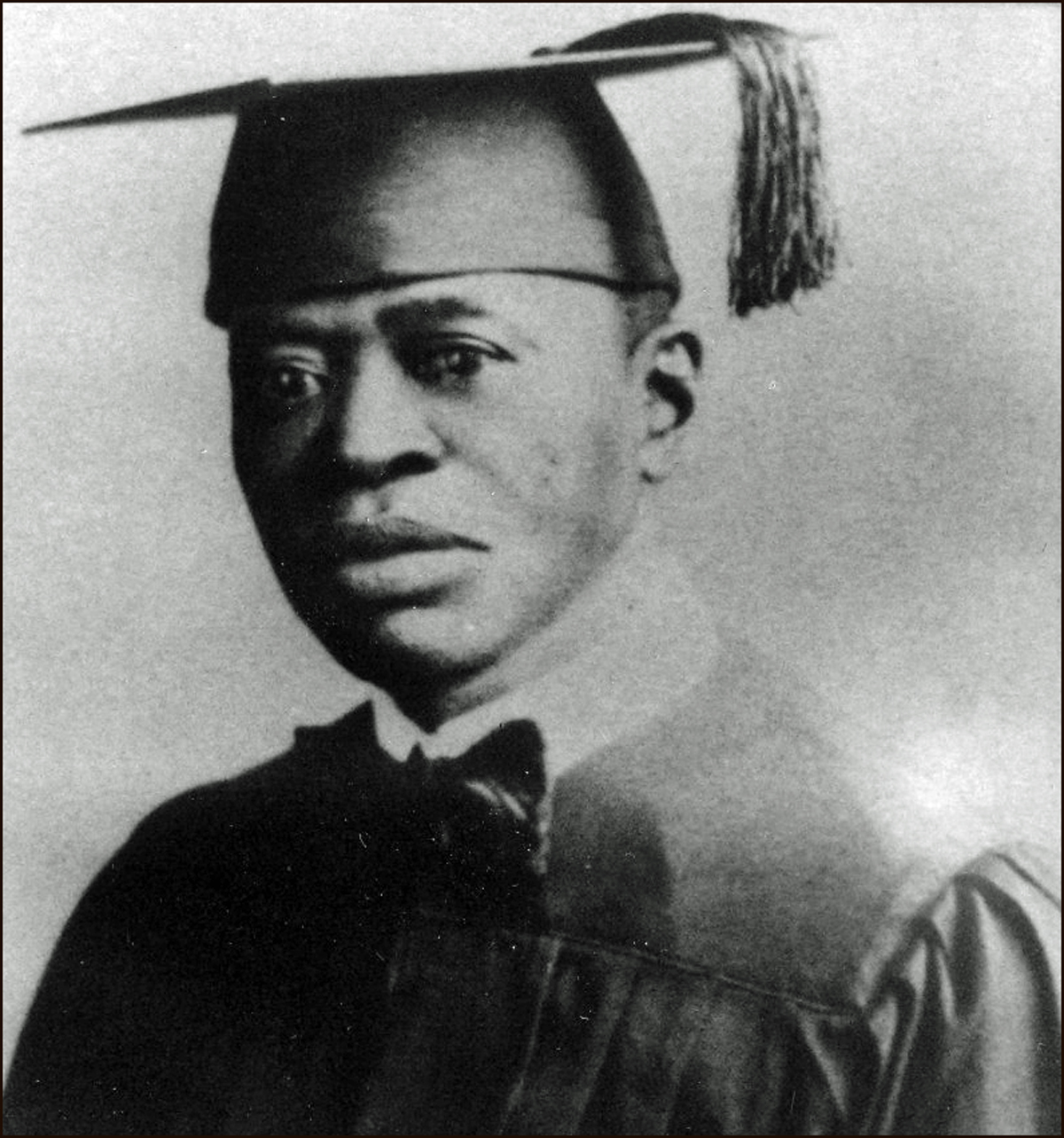
Wesley H. Passon (1864–1933) was an educator who contributed to the record of African American history.

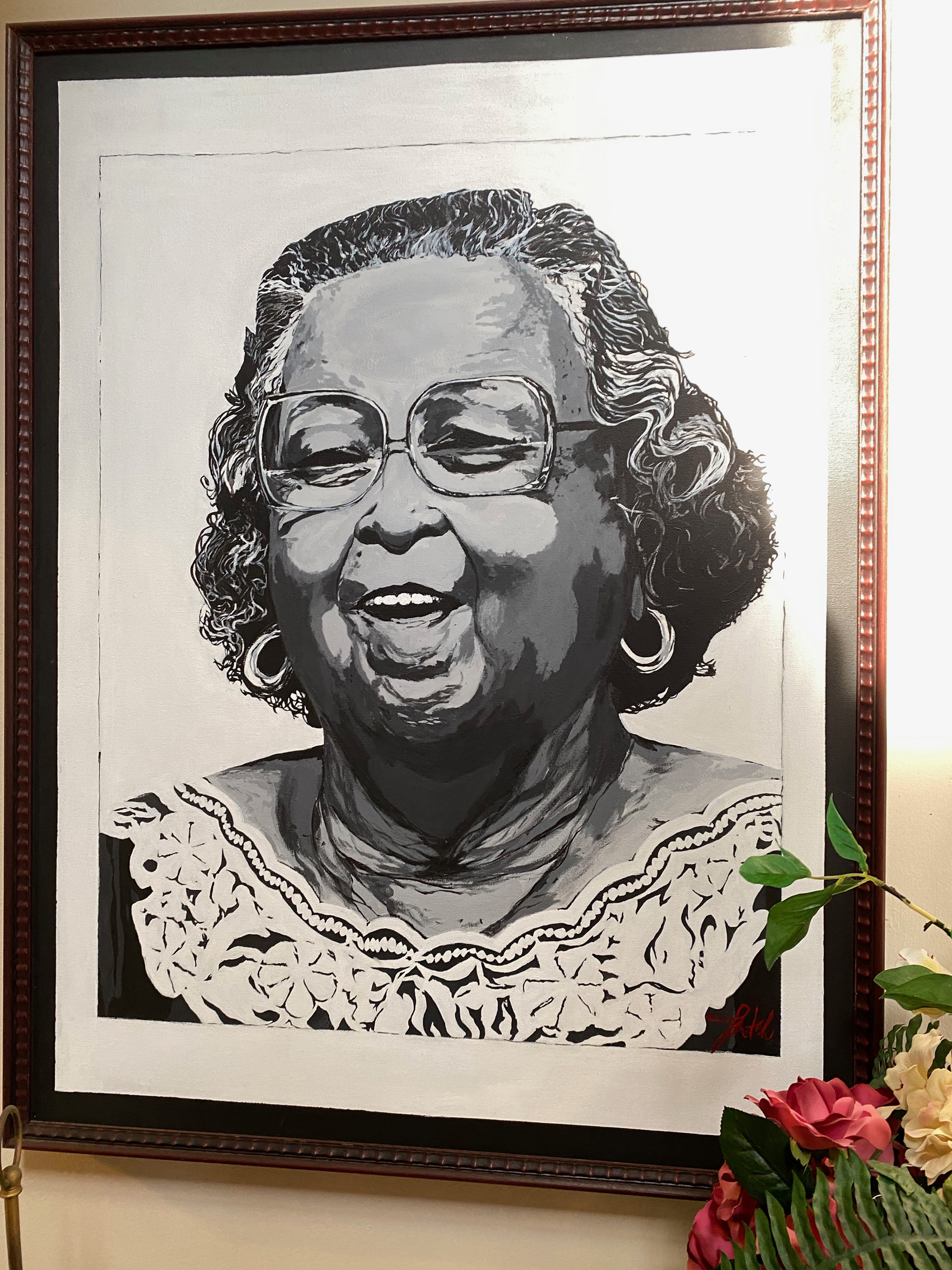
Ada Marie DeBlanc Simond (1903–1989) was an African American teacher, writer, historian, and public health activist.

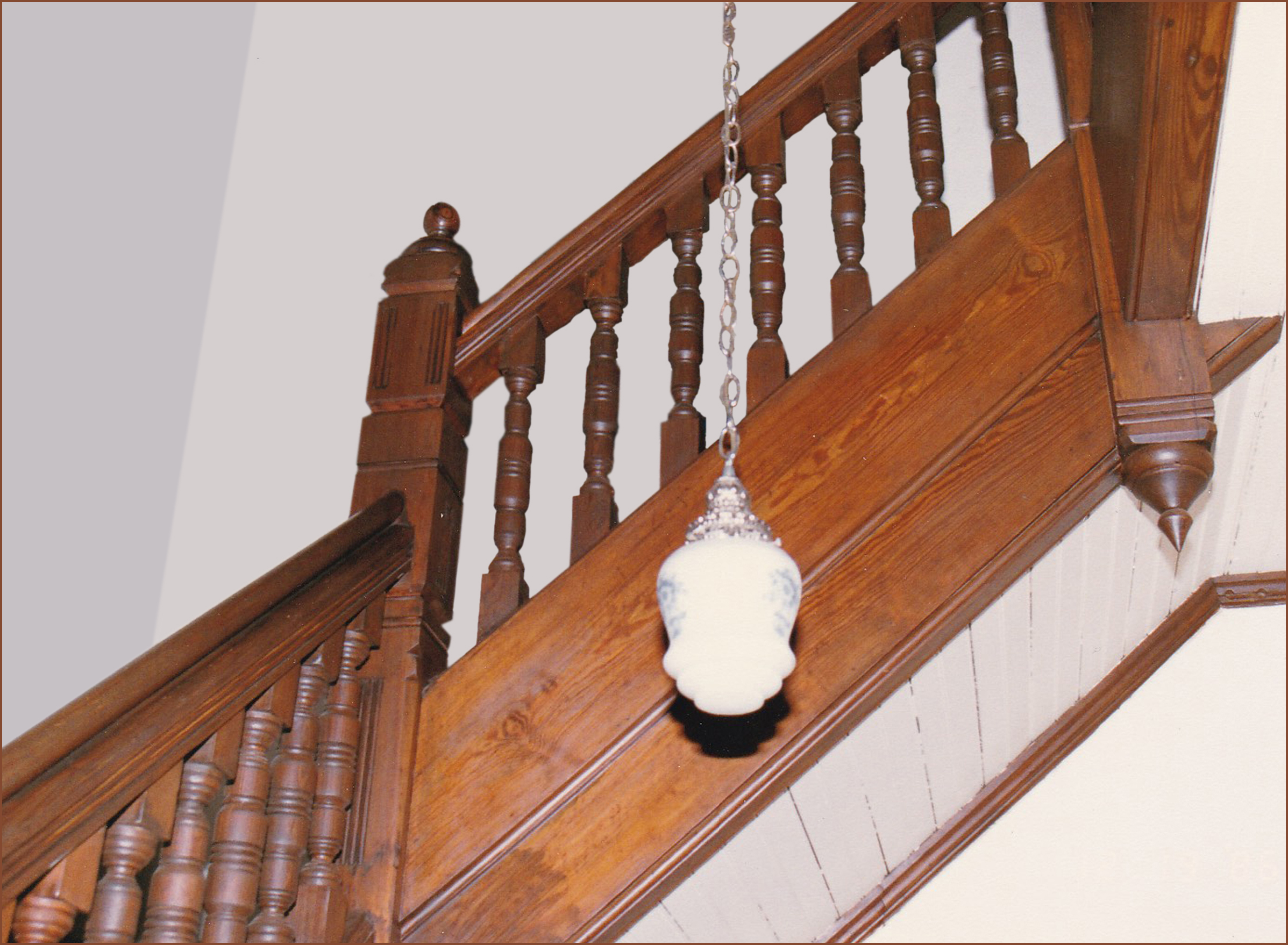
R.C. Lambie Stairway Balustrade following restoration circa 1980

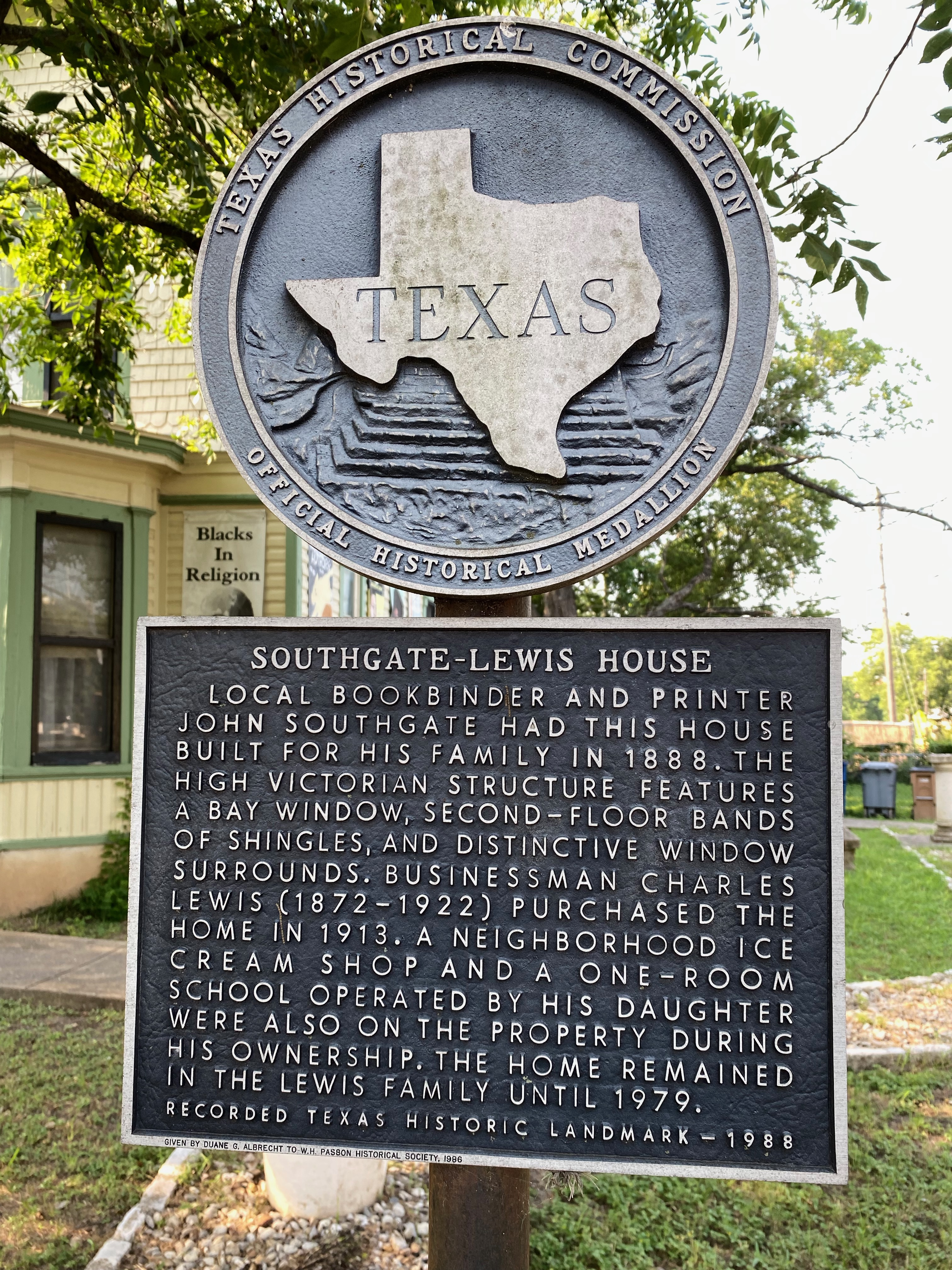
State of Texas historical medallion

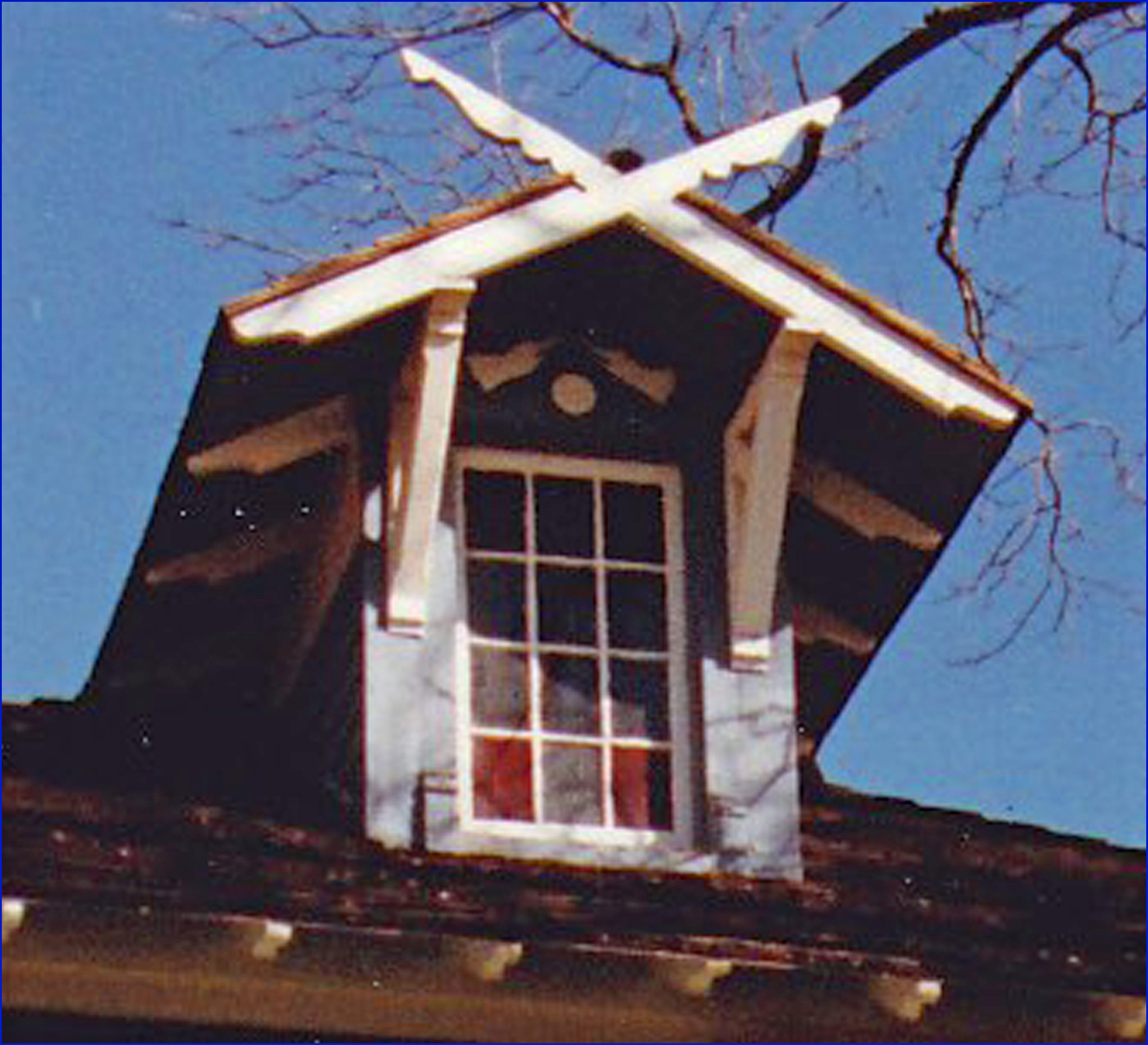
Victorian dormer

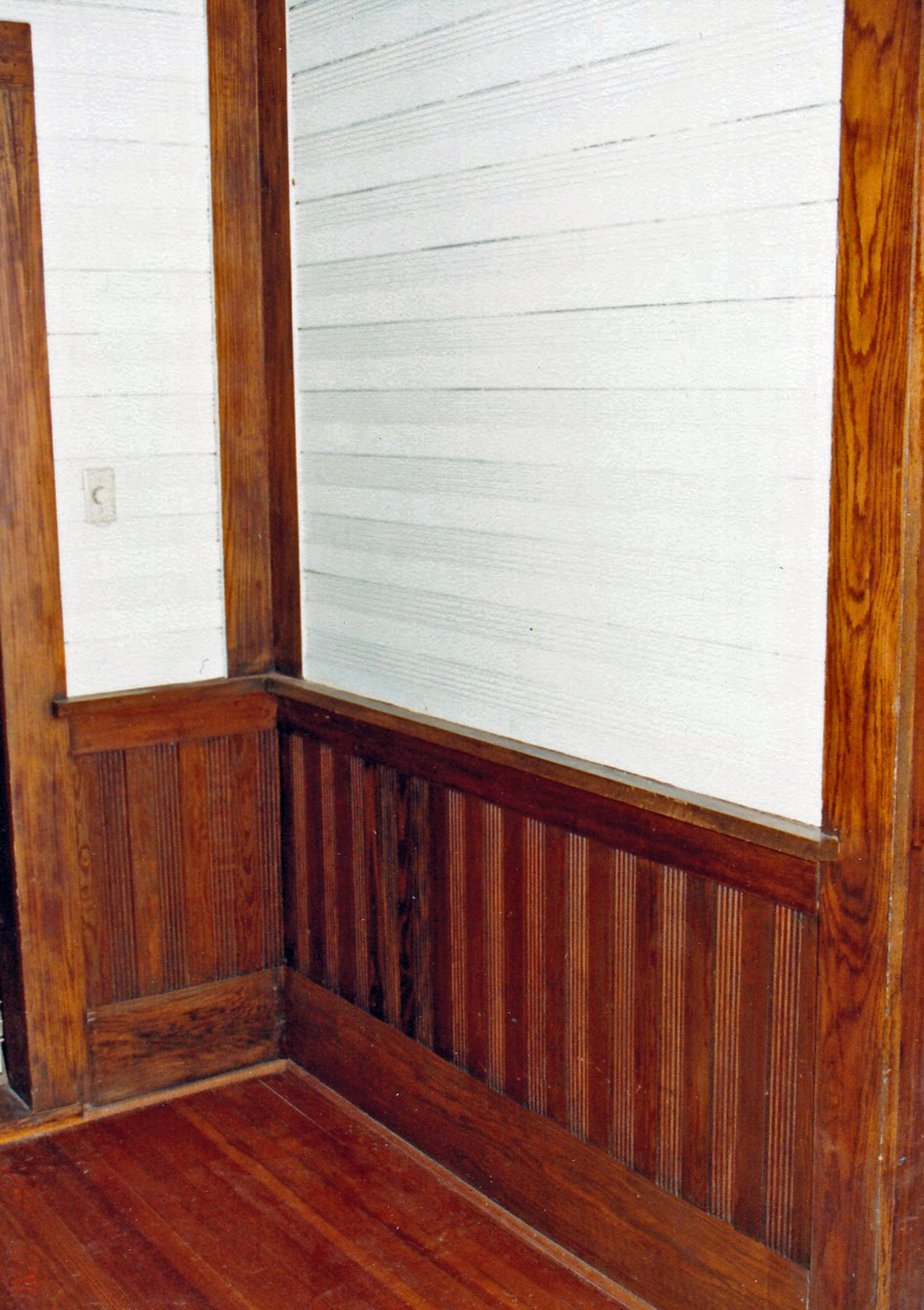
Wainscotting within the dining room of the Southgate–Lewis House

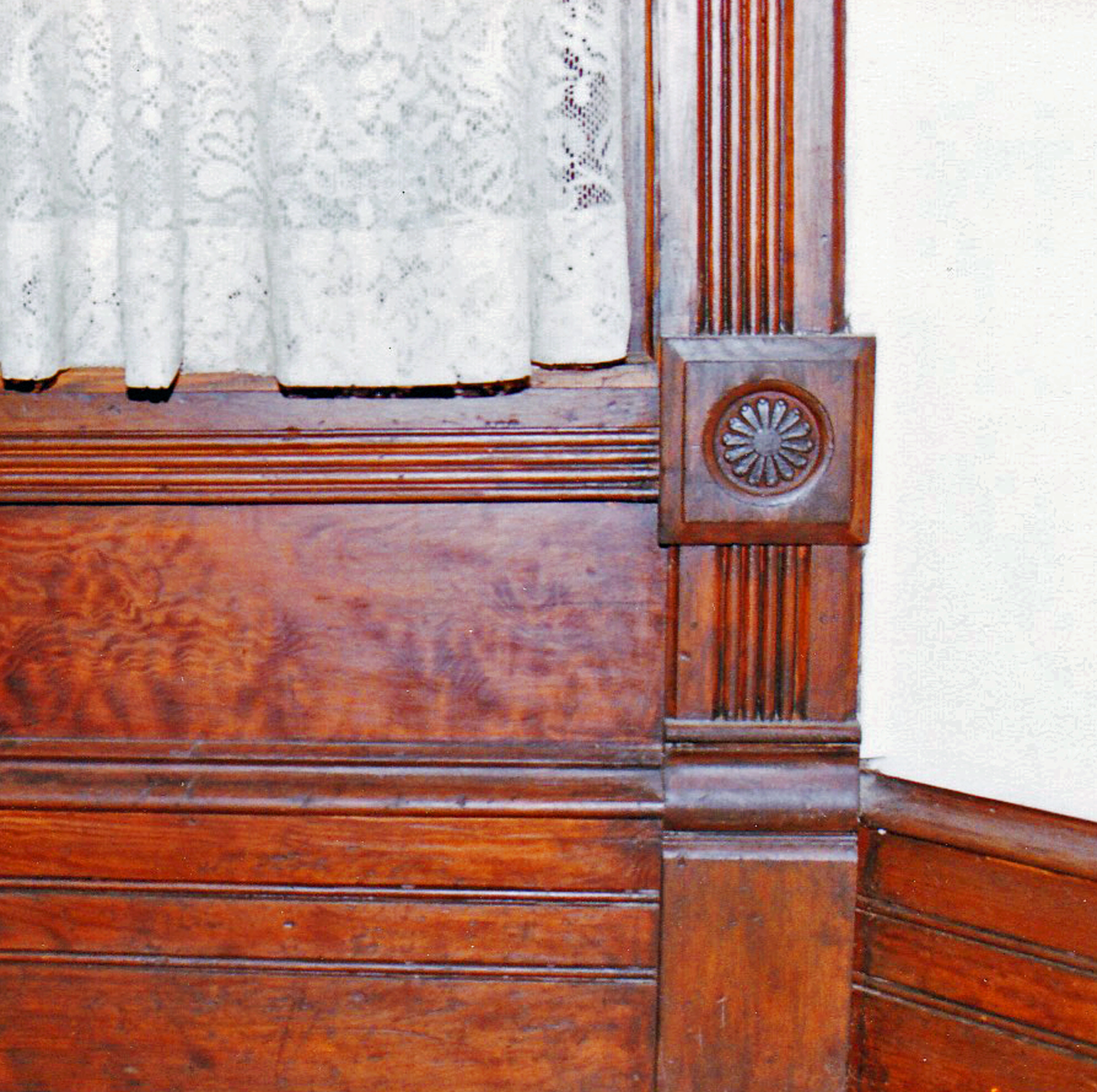
Window woodwork

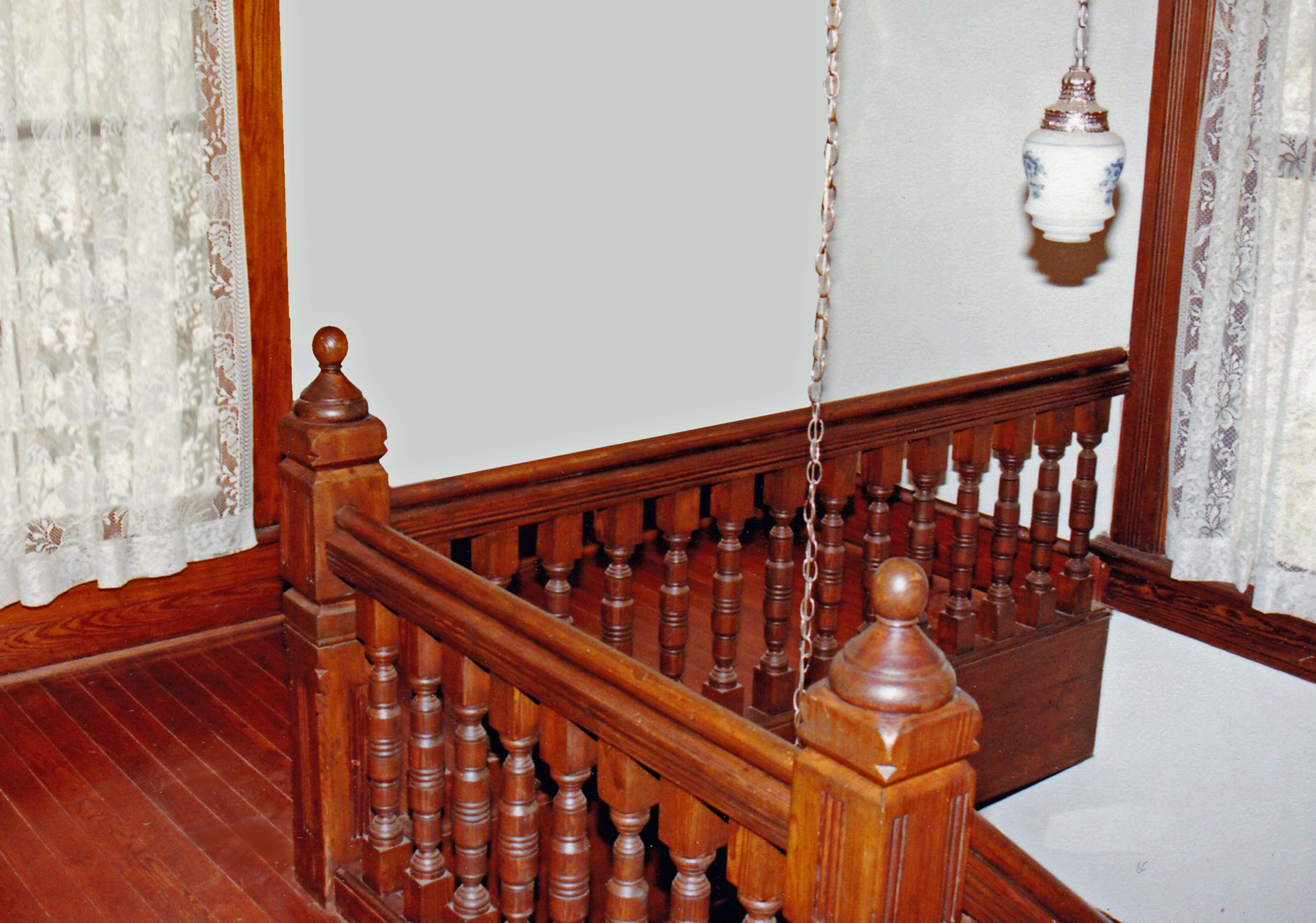
This photograph shows the balustrade and landing at the top of the staircase on the second floor, directly after the house was saved from demolition, restored, and preserved, circa 1980.

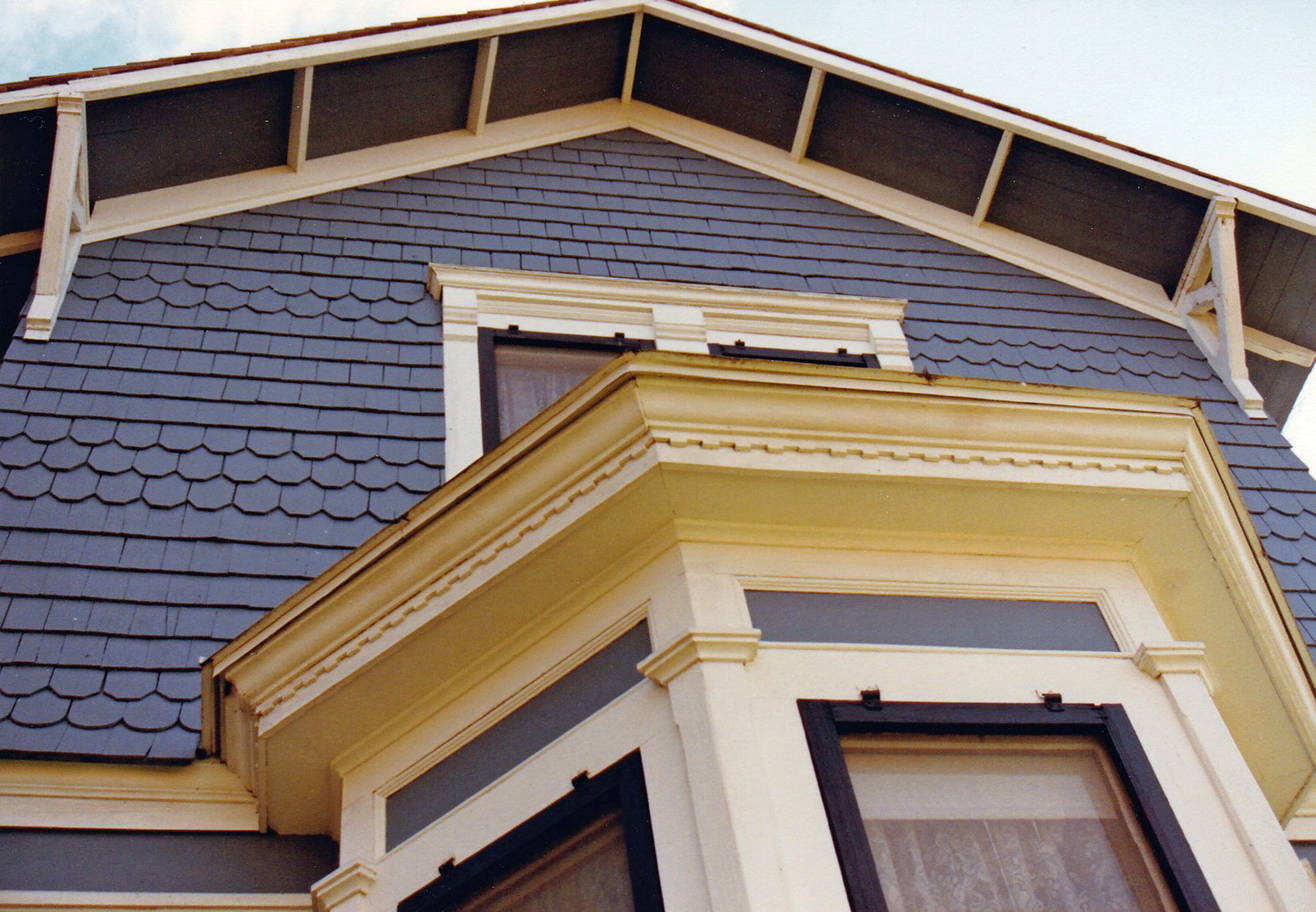
North Elevation Gable and Bay at Southgate

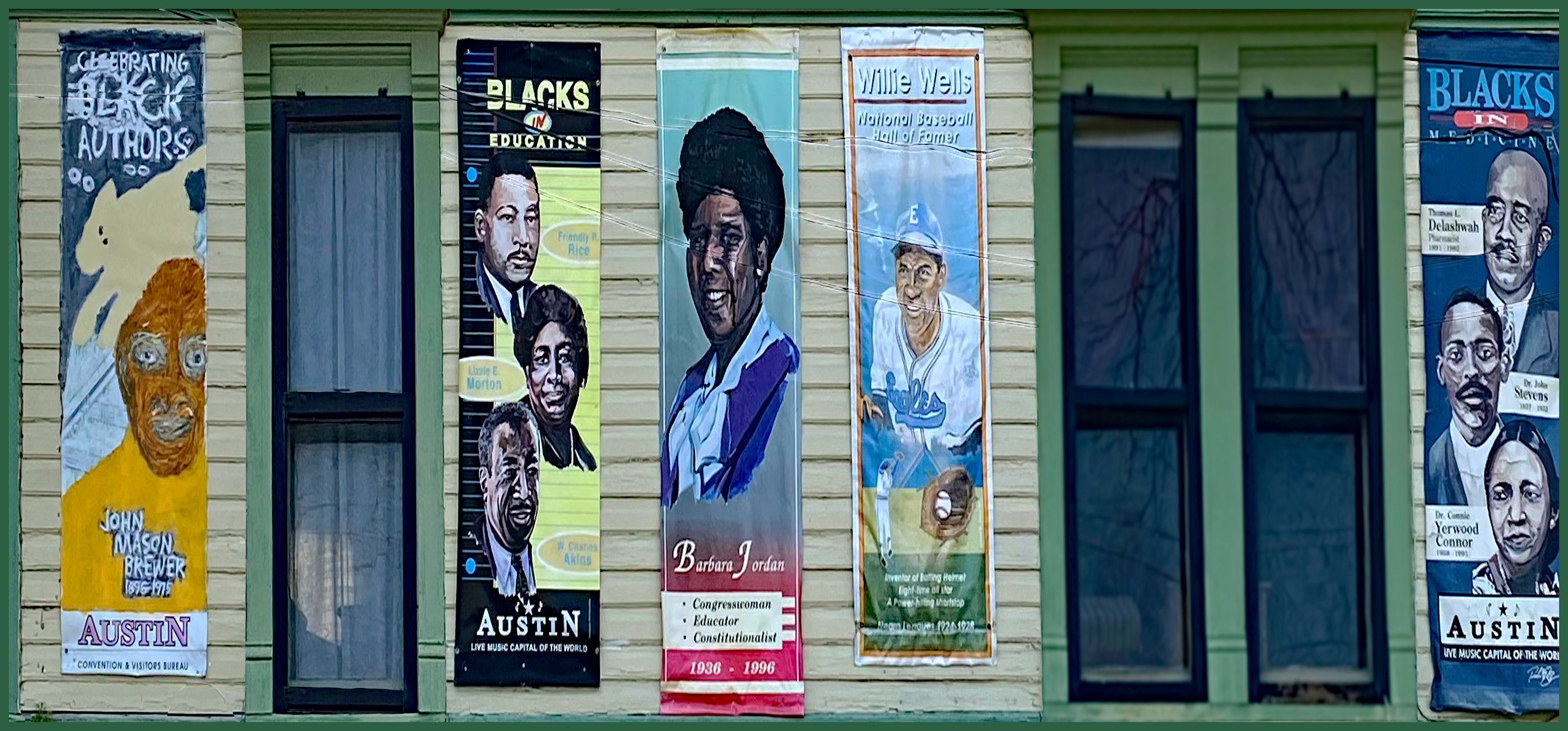
Southgate–Lewis House on June 19, 2021 with banners of distinguished African Americans

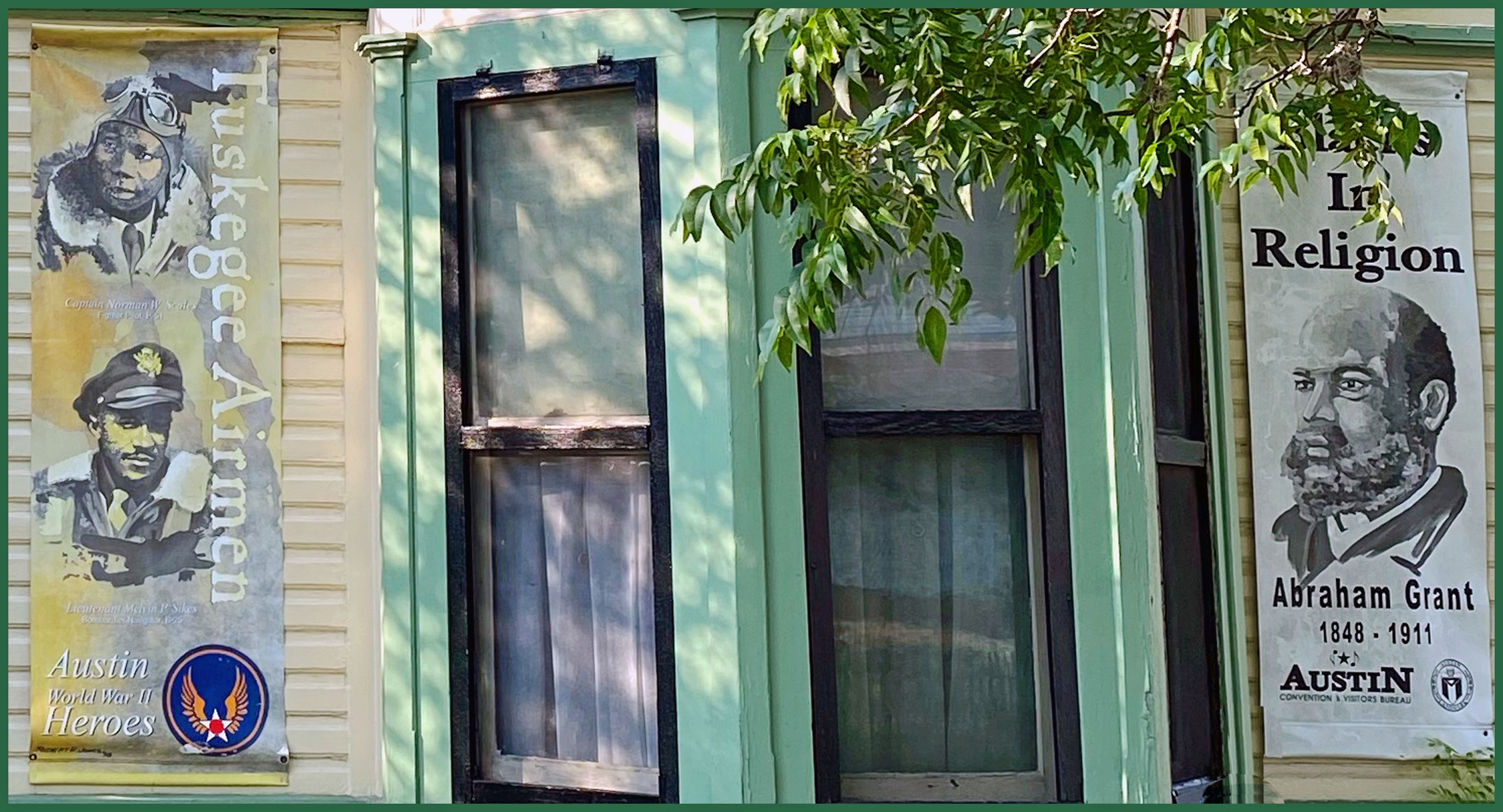
North elevation, front side of the Southgate–Lewis House on Juneteenth 2021 with banners of distinguished African Americans

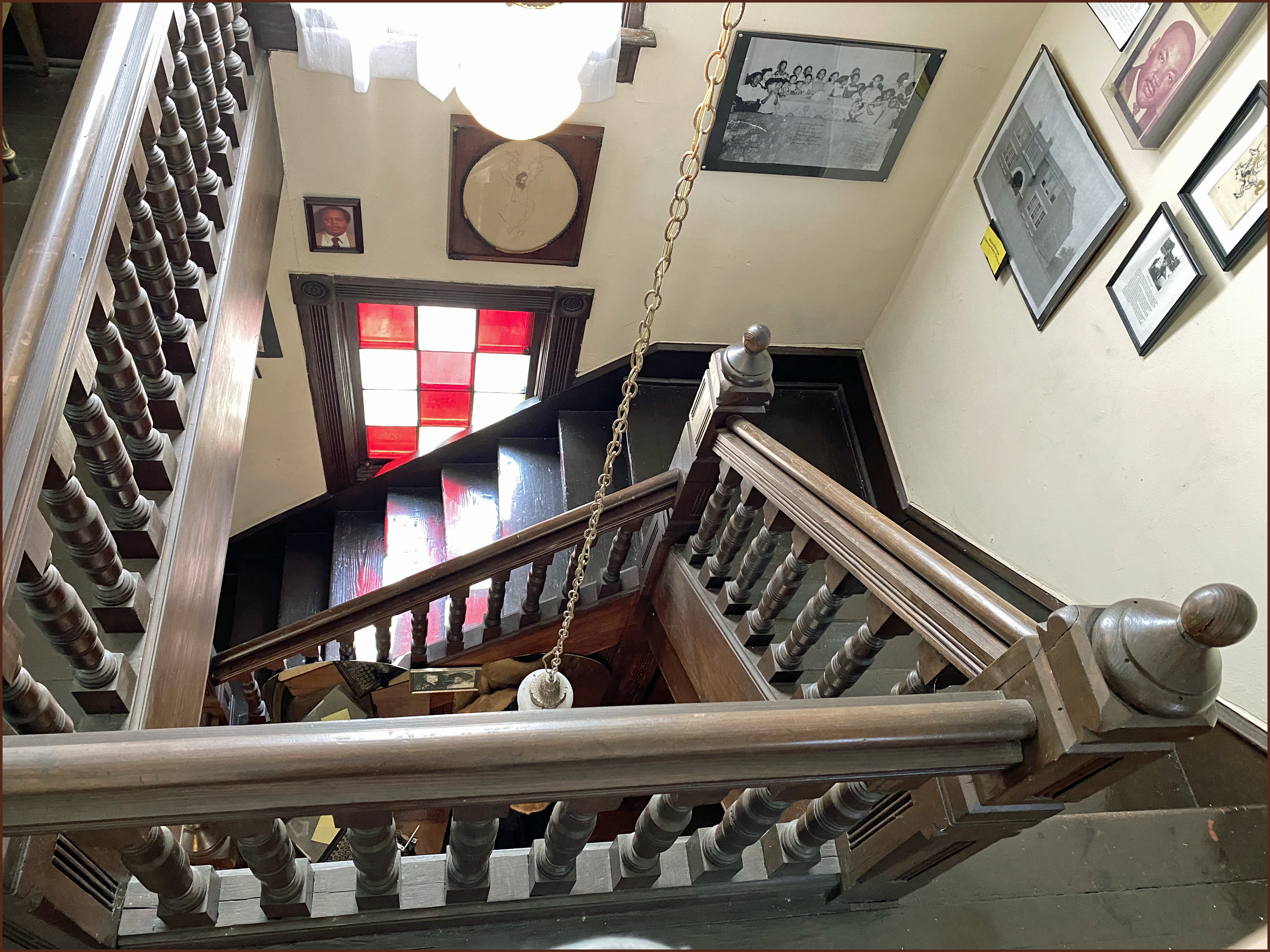
Staircase balustrade of the Southgate–Lewis House in June 2021 University of Texas at Austin "One of the finest staircases in all of Austin". Note that the W. H. Passon Society has exhibits displayed upon the walls of the stairway.

=== Location ===
The Southgate–Lewis House is located at 1501 East 12th Street in Austin, Texas. It stands in the Robertson Hill neighborhood, an area named for Joseph William Robertson, who acquired and subdivided the land around 1848.

=== Architecture ===
The National Register of Historic Places describes the architectural style as "High Victorian" Gothic Revival. The house features projecting eaves and gables as well as a prominent front bay window with a denticulated cornice. A continuous band of vertical siding at the base of the structure is capped with a horizontal band at the windowsill. Drop siding occurs up to the sills of the second-story windows, above which multiple rows of fish-scale and rectangular shingles alternate. Ornamental bargeboard trim with brackets is located at the eave line, and the roof is made of cedar shakes with two brick chimneys. The dormer on the west elevation has diagonal support brackets for the overhang and crossed bargeboard trim. There are double-hung windows.

== History ==
=== Construction and early ownership ===
The Southgate–Lewis House was constructed in 1888 by Robert C. Lambie for John Southgate, a local bookbinder and publisher. Southgate commissioned the home to be a private residence on what was then the main thoroughfare of East Austin.

Lewis Family Ownership

In 1913, the property was acquired by Charles M. Lewis, a professor at Samuel Huston College. The Lewis family maintained ownership until 1970. Charles M. Lewis’s daughter, Marguerite Mae Dee Lewis, resided in the home and taught at L.C. Anderson High School, a historically African American school that was located only two blocks from the house at the time. Following her death in 1970, the house was left vacant for around a decade.

=== Restoration and preservation ===
During the 1970s, several windows were broken, and parts of the roof were damaged, allowing water to enter the interior. The house was condemned by local authorities and scheduled for demolition due to safety concerns.

In February of 1979, Dr. Duane G. Albrecht, a newly appointed assistant professor at the University of Texas at Austin, identified the house a week before the scheduled demolition date, and initiated efforts to preserve it. Restoration work was conducted with guidance from architect David Hoffman and craftsman Peter J. Fears, with financial support from Franklin Savings, and technical assistance from the Heritage Society of Austin (now known as Preservation Austin).

== Notable figures ==
=== Joseph William Robertson ===
Joseph William Robertson (1809–1870) was a physician, a Texas Ranger, and a member of the House of Representatives in the Fourth Congress of the Republic of Texas. He established a pharmaceutical business and a medical practice on Congress Avenue and was elected mayor of Austin in 1843. In 1848, Robertson purchased a large tract of land from Alphonse Dubois de Saligny, one-half mile east of the city center (which included a home that is now known as The French Legation). He and his son, George L. Robertson, began actively subdividing the property and selling lots. This region, which includes the Southgate–Lewis House, became known as Robertson Hill. Robertson is now buried in Oakwood Cemetery, two blocks from the Southgate–Lewis House.

=== John Southgate ===
John Southgate was a bookbinder and publisher in Austin, Texas, with a business at 1008 Congress Avenue, located next door to Charles Lundberg's Bakery near the Texas State Capitol. Southgate had more than thirty years of experience working in both England and the United States in establishments such as Daniel Appleton & Company (now Appleton-Century-Crofts). In the late 1800s, the Austin American-Statesman made numerous positive remarks about the work of John Southgate, such as "Mr. John Southgate has just completed an 850-page ledger, which is a beautiful specimen of the bookbinder's art. It is handsomely bound, and in finish and workmanship cannot be excelled anywhere." (April 12, 1988, Page 3) and "The Statesman commends Mr. Southgate as an honest, faithful man, and one whose business engagements will be punctiliously complied with." (April 29, 1884, Page 4). Southgate eventually associated with the Eugene Von Boeckmann Publishing Company.

=== Robert C. Lambie ===
Contracted by John Southgate, Robert C. Lambie built the house in 1888, along with his stonemason Francis Fischer. Known for his woodwork, Lambie's work on the Southgate–Lewis Home is mentioned in the State of Texas Legislature: "the Southgate–Lewis Home at the corner of East 12th and Comal Streets in Austin .... [contains] one of the finest staircases in all of Austin".

His other works include the first engineering building and the Old Main Building of the UT Austin, the Elisabet Ney Museum, and the Hays County Courthouse.

=== Wesley H. Passon ===
Wesley H. Passon (1864–1933) was a Black educator who contributed to the preservation of African American history, most notably through a summary of the history of the African American population in Austin, Texas. In 1894, Passon was elected principal of the school in Wheatville, which was the first Black community associated with Austin after the Civil War, located just west of The University of Texas at Austin. The community of Wheatville was founded in 1867 by James Wheat, a former slave from Arkansas. The location that was once Wheatville (between 24th and 26th streets, Rio Grande Street to Shoal Creek) is now primarily student housing and contains the majority of all of the sororities and fraternities at The University of Texas at Austin. Passon went on to serve as principal of many other early schools of Austin, Texas, such as Blackshear School, which "opened in 1891 to provide free public education to African American children in the community." He was the principal of West Austin School, Clarksville School, Olive Street School, and Gregory Town. Two journals record the daily affairs of the West Austin School and the Clarksville School from 1908 to 1918.

In 1907, Passon provided a comprehensive historical record of the Metropolitan African Methodist Episcopal Church in Austin, which became an essential resource for scholars. In September 2000, the City of Austin, Texas, Historic Resources Survey of East Austin stated that "One of the most important secondary sources obtained for historical research in East Austin was the 1907 Metropolitan African Methodist Episcopal (A.M.E.) ... [book] ... compiled by historian W. H. Passon: The Historical and Biographical Souvenir and Program of the 25th Anniversary of Metropolitan AME Church, Austin, Texas 1882-1907".

== Public impact ==
=== Books ===
Ada Simond used the Lewis family and the Southgate-Lewis House as inspiration for a series of children's books relating to Black history in East Austin. The series included six books entitled Let's Pretend: Mae Dee and Her Family (beginning with Let's Pretend: Mae Dee and Her Family Go to Town in 1977), in which she told historically accurate stories of Black families living in Austin in the early 1900s. These books are "narrated by Mae Dee Lewis, whom Simond identified as a childhood friend." The series was named "Outstanding Publication on a History Subject" by the Texas Historical Commission in 1979.

== Gallery ==
After the 1980 restoration

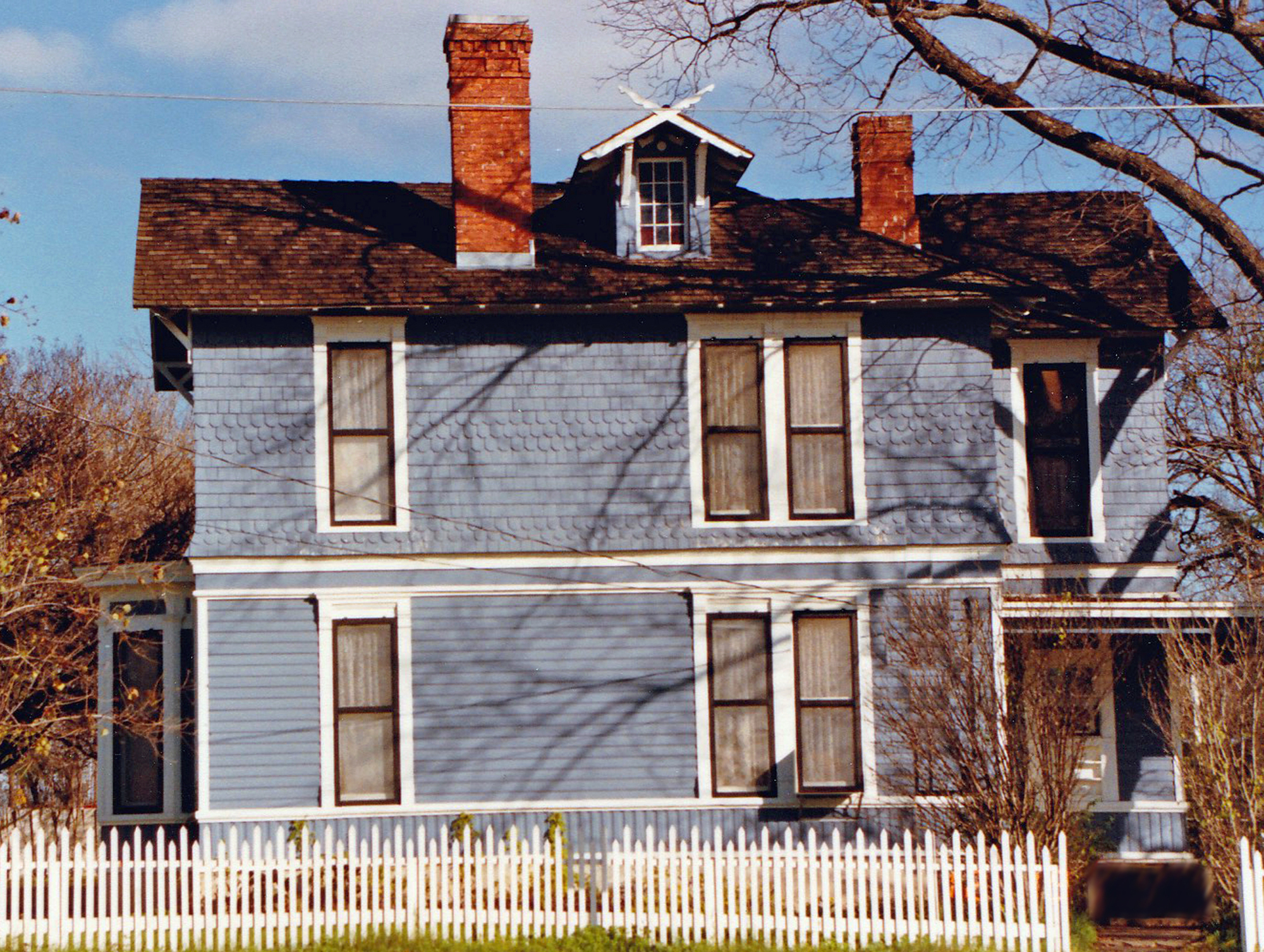
West elevation in 1985

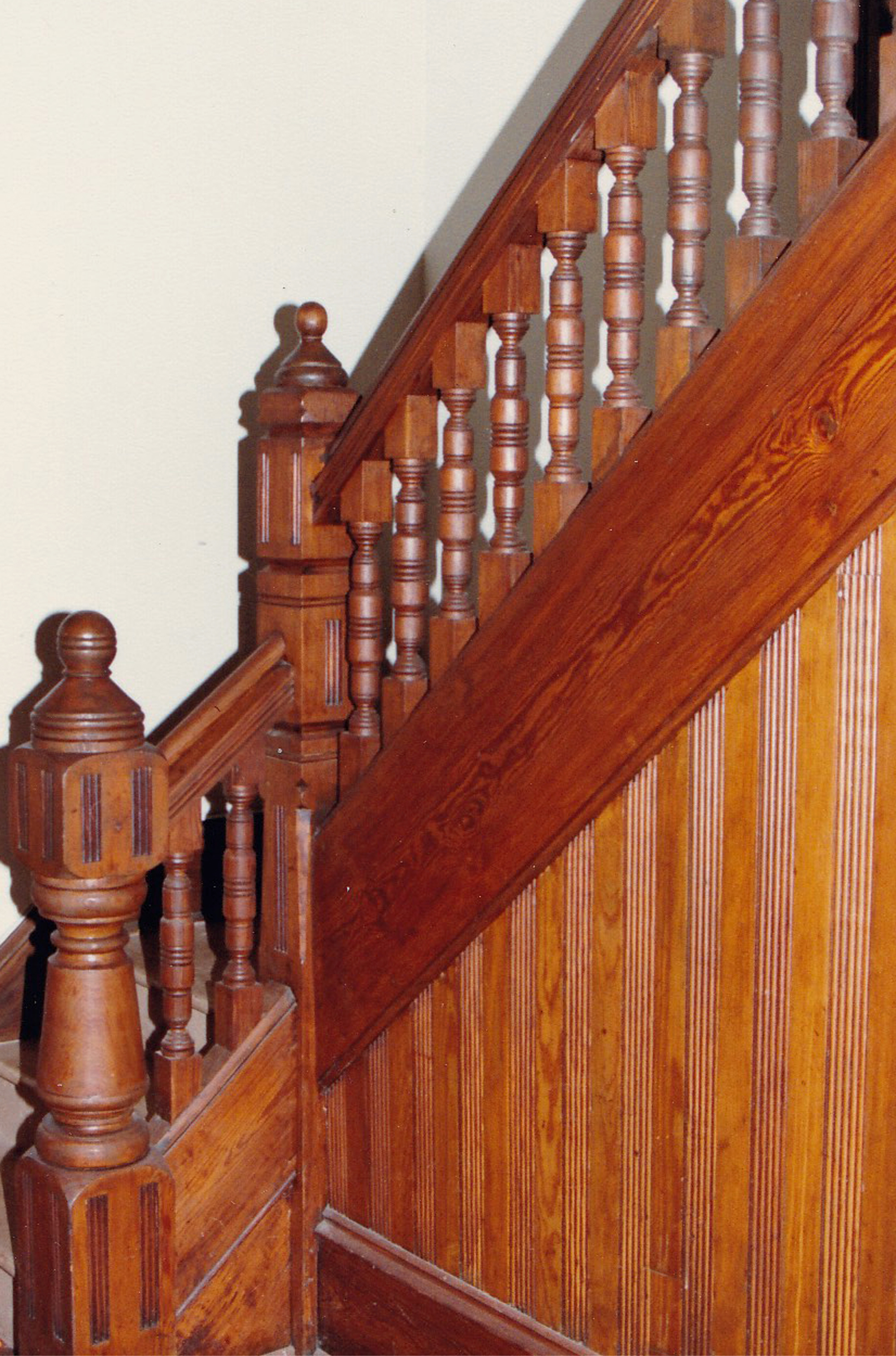
Balustrade for the staircase in the main entrance hall

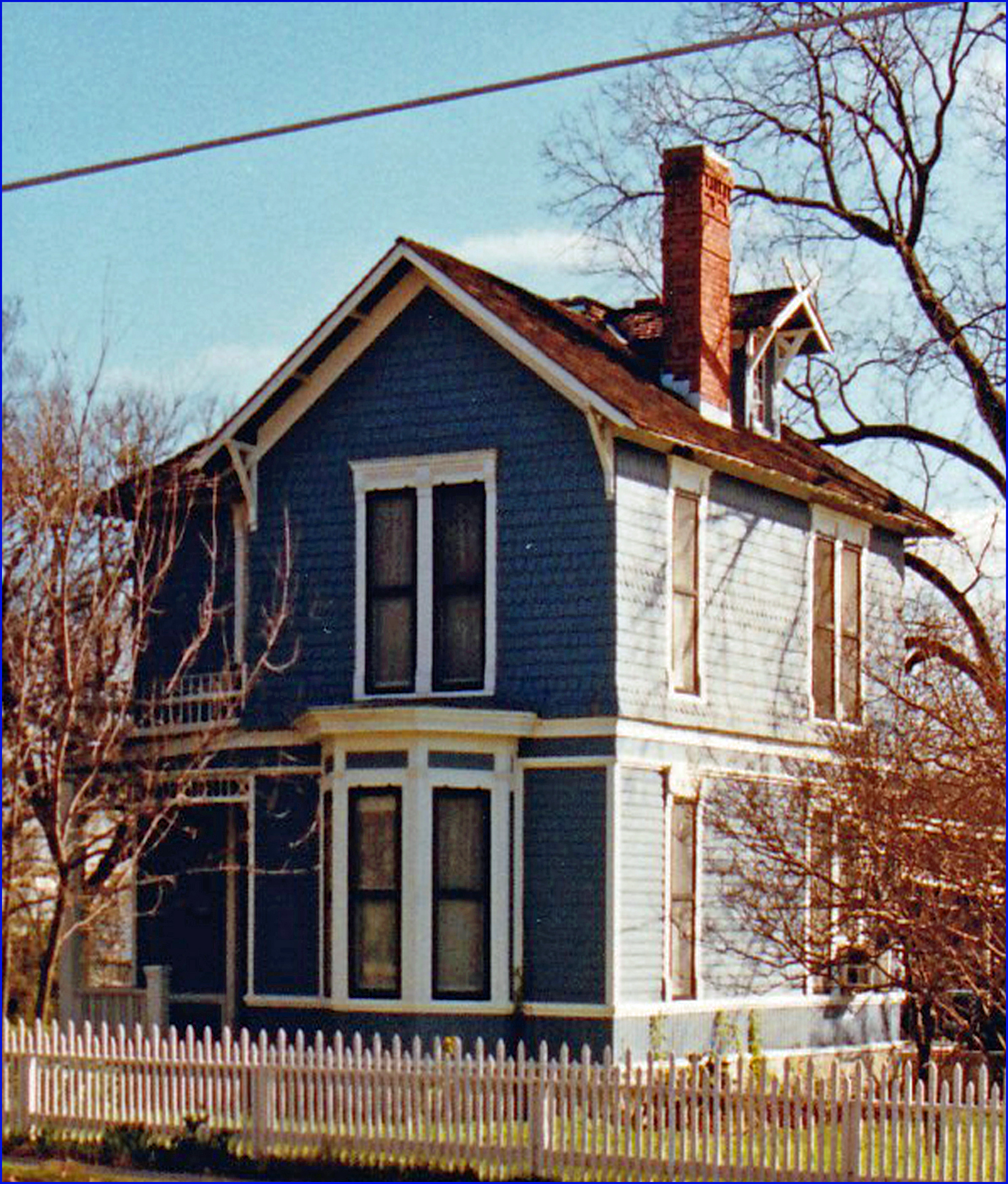
Northwest perspective c. 1980

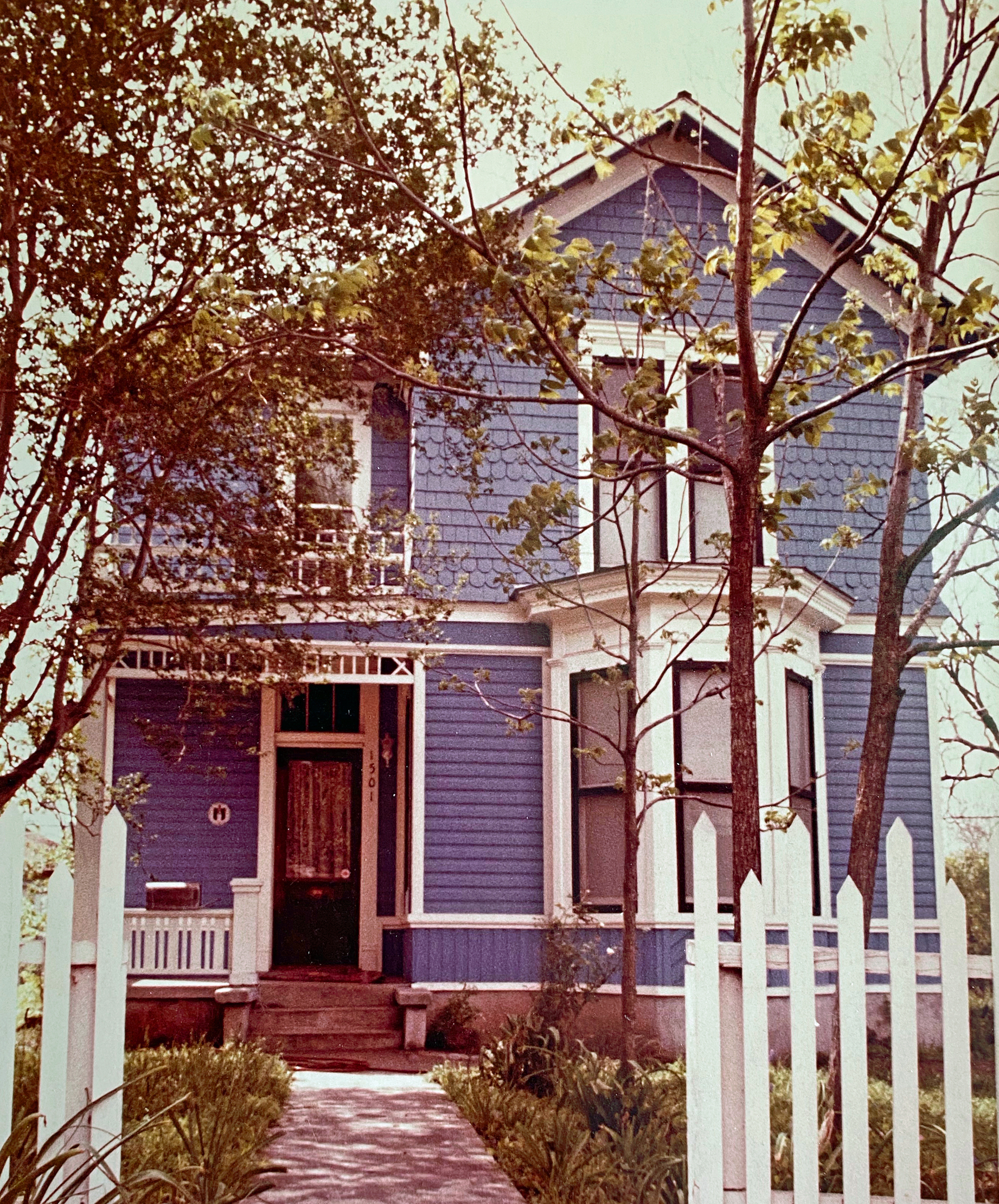
Front (north) elevation after 1980 historic preservation
