= L. C. Anderson =

Laurine Cecil Anderson (June 4, 1853, in Memphis, Tennessee – January 8, 1938, in Austin, Texas) was a teacher and school administrator known for co-founding the Colored Teachers State Association of Texas (CTSAT), as well as time spent as principal of the Prairie View Normal Institute.

== Education ==
L.C. Anderson was born as a son of enslaved parents. He went to public schools in his hometown in Memphis and received his B.A. in Methodist Ministry from Fisk University in Nashville, Tennessee.

== Early career ==
He had taught with Booker T. Washington at Tuskegee University, Alabama and trained for the Methodist ministry. In 1879, L.C. Anderson moved to Texas to assist his brother, Earnest H. Anderson who was also a minister and teacher at Prairie View Normal Institute (now known as Prairie View A&M University.) In Texas, Anderson's first job was the principal of a school in Brenham shortly before moving out to Prairie View. At Prairie View he served as an assistant to his brother, where Anderson had called for the school to become a university. In 1884, L.C. became the first president of the Colored Teachers State Association of Texas. He served as president until 1889. In addition to this, following his brother's death, on October 29, 1885, Governor Oran Roberts appointed L.C. principal of Prairie View. He worked to improve African-American Texans education and tried to unify American leaders in many fields, including business, politics and religious organizations.

== Prairie View ==
In 1876 Land was granted to build and institution for an “agricultural and mechanical college for the benefit of colored youth” part of the agriculture and mechanical college of Texas. The college was doing poorly and was on the verge of closing but was saved by an idea to turn it into two smaller schools. One of which was Prairie View Normal Institution. This institution was established in 1879. Ernest H. Anderson (1850–1885) was appointed the principal and his brother L.C. Anderson was brought along as his assistant. Following E.H.'s death, Laurine was appointed principal, where he remained for eleven years. He was later fired and replaced with Edward L. Blackshear.

== CTSAT: Colored Teachers State Association of Texas ==
The Colored Teachers State Association of Texas was founded by L.C. Anderson, David Abner Sr. and 11 other people. It was organized to “promote quality education for blacks and good working conditions for black teachers.” The association was funded by member dues and all the work was voluntary. It didn't adopt its first constitution in 1906 but in 1893 it organized eight district associations from East Texas in efforts to stop the lack of black political power in Texas with the help of politicians Norris Wright Cuney and John Rayner. Because of its political affiliation was considered a political organization. In the early years it was campaigning for black university as the members felt black teachers and students would struggle to get equal status with that of whites without this education. The association has continued to try created equal rights for black teachers and was incorporated in 1921. The CTSAT has allowed black teachers to get guaranteed equality of teacher salaries in 1961 and also supported Sweatt with by funding and providing legal aid in 1946.

== Late 1800s-1930s ==
In 1896, following Eleven years as principal of Prairie View, Anderson was fired from his position. L.C. had gotten into a heated argument with D.A. Paulus during a board meeting at Prairie View. They argued over black rights, a spot Anderson was very passionate about and Paulus was blatantly disrespecting. This very debate is what ultimately cost him his job on the spot. Edward L. Blackshear replaced L.C. as principal. There had been speculation to as whether or not Paulus may have provoked Anderson, to give reason to fire him. Some believe he was over politics, after republican Anderson was replaced with democrat Blackshear. Ironically Anderson moved to Austin to serve as Superintendent of Black Schools, a position that was formally held by Blackshear. He served here from 1896 to 1929. At this school which later became Anderson High school, was first named for his brother and later named in his honor. At the time, this was the only high school in the city for blacks. He was principal and taught Latin until 1928 when he had to resign due to deteriorating health. After his death in 1938, the Austin school board had decided to rename the school after him and his thirty-two years of service as principal. Although resigning he stayed on continuing to teach Latin until his death.

=== L.C. Anderson High School ===
L.C. Anderson High school was created in 1889. This was the first high school for African American children in Austin Texas. It was named after Earnest H. Anderson, who served as principal of Prairie View Normal Institution from 1879-1885. In 1938 the school was renamed after his brother L.C. Anderson, who also served as Prairie View's Principal for eleven years as well as Anderson High School's principal for 33 years and taught until his death in 1938.

== Personal life ==
Anderson married Lizzie Pollard in 1882 and had four children with her prior to her death. Following his wife's death, he remarried Fanny Pollard and they had an additional child. He died on January 8, 1938, and was buried at Oakwood Cemetery.
