= Anderson High School (Texas) =

L.C. Anderson High School

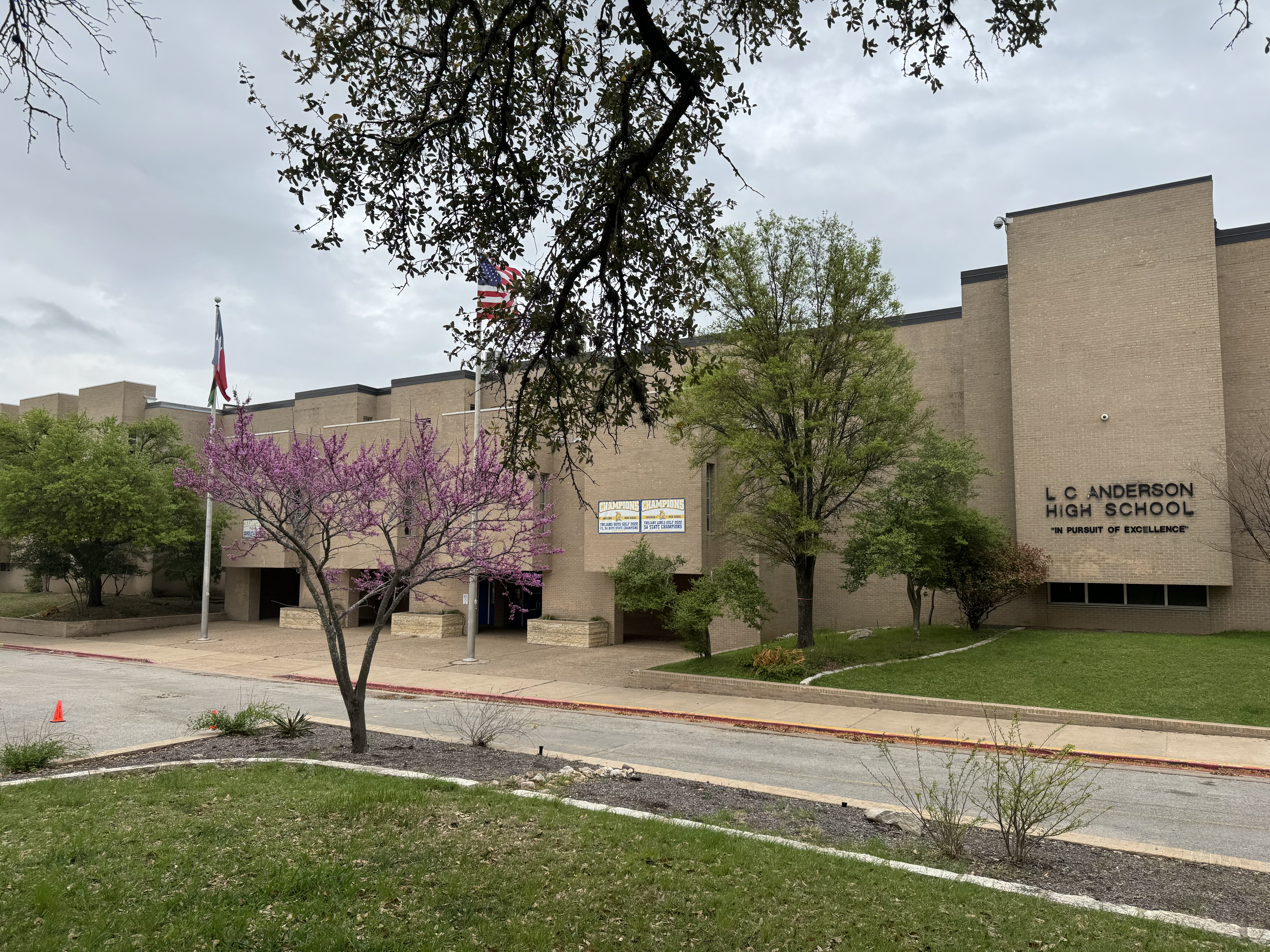

Location
- 8403 Mesa Drive; Austin, Texas 78759; United States; 30°22′33″N 97°45′13″W

Information
- School type: Public High School
- Motto: In Pursuit of Excellence
- Founded: 1973
- School district: Austin Independent School District
- Principal: Brian Lancaster
- Teaching staff: 123.33 (FTE)
- Grades: 9–12
- Enrollment: 2,179 (2025–2026)
- Student to teacher ratio: 17.57
- Language: English, Mandarin Chinese (Immersion Program)
- Area: Austin, Texas
- Colors: Blue and Gold
- Athletics: UIL Class 5A (2024-)
- Mascot: Trojan
- Team name: Anderson Trojans, Anderson Trojan Marching Band
- Rival: McCallum HS
- Feeder schools: Middle School; Murchison; Elementary Schools; Davis, Doss, Hill, Summitt, Pillow, Zavala
- Website: anderson.austinschools.org

L.C. Anderson High School is a public high school located in the city of Austin, Texas, United States. It is a part of the Austin Independent School District. The school is named for Laurine Cecil (L.C.) Anderson who served as principal of Prairie View Normal Institute (now Prairie View A&M University), founded the Colored Teachers State Association of Texas (CTSAT) and served as principal of the original Anderson (then E.H. Anderson) from 1896 to 1929. L.C. Anderson opened at its current location on Mesa Dr. in 1973.

== Extracurricular activities ==
=== State titles ===
- Boys' Golf
  - Team: 1994 (4A), 1995 (4A), 1997 (4A), 1998 (4A), 2022 (5A)
- Girls' Golf
  - Team: 2022 (5A)
- Boys' Swimming & Diving
- Girls' Swimming & Diving
  - Team: 1974, 1982
- Girls' Lacrosse
  - 2022 (5A)

== Original Anderson High School ==
The school was originally named after Earnest H. Anderson, who served as principal of Prairie View Normal Institution from 1879 to 1885. In 1938, it was renamed for his brother, L. C. Anderson, who served as the school's principal from 1896 to 1929.

The school served as Austin's East Side high school, serving the city's African American population from 1889 until 1971. The original Anderson was housed at four different locations before it was closed in 1971 as part of desegregation efforts, the current high school was opened in 1973 at its present site.

Previous locations:

- 1889–1908: Corner of San Marcos St and East 11th St
- 1908–1913: Olive St (became an elementary school until late 1940s)
- 1913–1953: Corner of Pennsylvania Ave and Comal St (site of present day Kealing Middle School, building burned in the 1980s)
- 1953–1971: 900 Thompson St (later served as AISD's Alternative Learning Center, building was demolished and reopened as the new site of Eastside Early College High School in 2021

== Athletics ==
The Yellow Jackets won the PVIL Football State Championship in 1942, 1956, 1957 and 1961 and finished runner-up in 1940 and 1945.

=== State titles ===
- Football
  - 1942 (PVIL 2A), 1956 (PVIL 3A), 1957 (PVIL 3A), 1961 (PVIL 4A)

== Notable alumni ==
- Rasmus Bach (2013) – basketball player
- Mehcad Brooks (1999) – actor
- Jeremiah Byers (2019) – NFL football player
- Kris Clack (1995) – basketball player
- Ben Fricke (1994) – NFL football player
- Thomas "Hollywood" Henderson (transferred) – Former NFL football player
- Alex Jones (1993) – radio host and conspiracy theorist
- Dick "Night Train" Lane – Former NFL football player
- Bobby Micho – Former NFL football player
- Ron Nirenberg – San Antonio mayor
- Justin Ruggiano (2000) – former Major League Baseball player
- Ed Small (2025) – college football wide receiver for the TCU Horned Frogs
- Lee Tunnell – former Major League Baseball player
- Willie Wells – Negro league baseball player
