= Joyce Yerwood =

African American physician

Ursula Joyce Yerwood
- Born: January 1909; Victoria, Texas
- Died: October 2, 1987 (aged 78)
- Education: Samuel Huston College; Meharry Medical College
- Occupation: Physician
- Known for: Founding the Yerwood Center
- Relatives: Connie Yerwood Connor (sister); Ada Simond (stepmother)

Ursula Joyce Yerwood (January 1909 – October 2, 1987) was the first female African American physician in Fairfield County, Connecticut, and founder of the Yerwood Center, the first community center for African Americans in Stamford, Connecticut.

== Biography ==
=== Early life ===
Joyce Yerwood was born in Victoria, Texas, to Melissa Brown Yerwood and Charles Yerwood. Melissa Yerwood was a teacher and died shortly after Yerwood's birth. Charles Yerwood was a physician, one of fewer than twenty African American physicians in Texas. Charles Yerwood brought Joyce and her sister Connie with him on house calls, which inspired both of them to study medicine. Charles later remarried Ada Simond, who became Joyce's stepmother.

=== Education ===
Yerwood attended the Eliza Dee Home, a finishing school for African American girls. She graduated from Samuel Huston College, in Austin, Texas, in 1928. With her sister, Connie, Yerwood went on to study at Meharry Medical College, in Nashville, Tennessee, where they were the only two female students in their first year. During their time at Meharry, the Yerwoods experienced discrimination against women. When they were sophomores, their teacher told them that he did not believe in women doctors.

Yerwood graduated cum laude in 1933. She completed her internship at the Kansas City General Hospital in Kansas City, Kansas. She completed her residency in Philadelphia, Pennsylvania. Yerwood specialized in pediatrics.

In 1936, Yerwood married Dr. Joseph Carwin, and they moved to Stamford, Connecticut.

=== Career ===
In 1937, Yerwood opened a medical practice in Port Chester, New York, where she treated underserved populations for 18 years. In 1955, she moved her office to Stamford, Connecticut, becoming the first female African American physician in Fairfield County. Over the course of her career, she delivered over 2,000 babies.

Yerwood retired from her practice in 1981. In retirement, she became the medical director of the Methadone Clinic of Stamford's Liberation Program.

=== Civic engagement ===
Yerwood was a social justice advocate, promoting educational and cultural opportunities for African American youth in her community. In 1939, she founded the Little Negro Theater performing arts group. As the group grew, she bought a storefront in Stamford, which became Stamford Negro Community Center in 1943. The center moved to its current location in 1975, and it was renamed the Yerwood Center.

Yerwood served as the chairman of the Board of Trustees of the Union Baptist Church. With her husband, she helped found the Greenwich Chapter of the NAACP. She was also a member of Eastern Star, Alpha Kappa Alpha sorority, the Girl Friends, Inc., the Soroptimists Club, the Stamford Medical Society, the National Medical Association, the Stamford Hospital Corporation, and the World Medical Association.

Over the course of her life, Yerwood received the Stamford Mayor's Award, the Alpha Kappa Alpha Heritage Award, and the Hannah G. Solomon Award.

Yerwood was inducted into the Connecticut Women's Hall of Fame in 2016.
