= Connie Yerwood Connor =

American physician

Connie Yerwood Conner (c. 1908 – June 11, 1991) was a Texas physician and the first black doctor to serve on the Texas Department of Health.

== Biography ==
Conner was born in Victoria, Texas, and grew up in Austin. Early on, she decided she wanted to be a doctor. Conner's father was a physician and as a young woman, she and her sister Joyce Yerwood spent time with her father on the job. In 1925, she graduated from Samuel Huston College. Then Conner graduated cum laude from Meharry Medical College in 1933. Conner's residency was in pediatrics, but she eventually became more interested in public health and so went back to school on scholarship to study at the University of Michigan.

Conner became the first black woman to work for the Texas Department of Health in 1937. She was involved in training midwives in East Texas and set up wellness clinics in rural Texas. Conner was passed over for promotions regularly until the Civil Rights Act of 1964 was passed. She was the first black woman director of the Maternal and Child Health in Texas. By the time she retired in 1977, she had been promoted to the director of health services in Texas.

Conner died on June 11, 1991, in Austin. She is buried in Evergreen Cemetery in Austin, Texas.
