= Colored Teachers State Association of Texas =

American educators' association

The Colored Teachers State Association of Texas (CTSAT) was created in 1884 to unite black educators across the state of Texas. The main goals were to create equality in the public school system under Jim Crow laws and to establish a black institution of higher education as outlined in the Texas Constitution of 1876. The organization operated for eighty-two years until its voluntary dissolution in December 1966.

The association was founded in 1884 at Prairie View Normal and Industrial College by L. C. Anderson, Prairie View's principal, David Abner, an educator, and ten others. At that time, Prairie View was the only school of higher education for black students in the state of Texas, which operated under the Hampton-Tuskegee model. It was the only option for black students seeking a liberal arts education with no options in the state of Texas. The Colored Teachers State Association of Texas pushed for better educational opportunities, arguing against the belief that black minds were only suited for industrial training. In 1901, college-level courses were finally added to the Prairie View curriculum.

In 1921, the Colored Teachers State Association of Texas began publishing the Texas Standard, the organization's official publication.

In 1943, Colored Teachers State Association of Texas began filing suits for equal pay for colored teachers. The first case was won in Dallas with Houston following suit two months later. Equal pay throughout the entire state was not realized until 1961 when state regulations mandated minimum starting wages and experiential increases.

Colored Teachers State Association of Texas helped to provide legal support to Heman Sweatt in his case to gain entrance into the [University of Texas] law school in the influential Sweatt v. Painter case. The decision in favor of Sweatt in 1950 began breaking down the walls of segregation in higher education in Texas and helped lay the foundation for later cases against "Jim Crow" laws, helping to lead to the overturning of Plessy v. Ferguson in Brown v. Board of Education in 1954.

In August 1966, the Colored Teachers State Association of Texas decided to voluntarily dissolve on December 30 of that year, merging into the Texas State Teachers Association.
