= Alvin Luedecke =

United States Air Force general

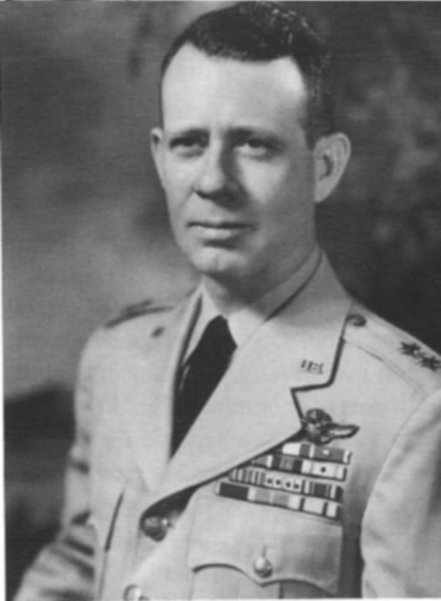
- Major General Alvin R. Luedecke c. 1954
- Born: 1 October 1910; Eldorado, Texas, U.S.
- Died: 9 August 1998 (aged 87) San Antonio, Texas, U.S.
- Buried: Fort Sam Houston National Cemetery, San Antonio, Texas
- Allegiance: United States
- Branch: United States Army; United States Air Force
- Service years: 1932–1958
- Rank: Major General
- Commands: Joint Task Force 7; Armed Forces Special Weapons Project
- Conflicts: World War II: Burma 1943–44; China 1944–45
- Awards: See list
- Education: A&M College of Texas
- Other work: General Manager of the United States Atomic Energy Commission; Deputy Director of the Jet Propulsion Laboratory; Acting President of Texas A&M University

Alvin Roubal Luedecke (; 10 October 1910 – 9 August 1998) was a United States Army Air Forces general during World War II. He commanded the Armed Forces Special Weapons Project after the war. After retiring from the Air Force in 1958, he became the General Manager of the United States Atomic Energy Commission. He was appointed deputy director of the Jet Propulsion Laboratory in 1964 and was the acting president of Texas A&M University from 30 March 1970, to 1 November 1970.

== Early life and career ==
Alvin Roubal Luedecke was born in Eldorado, Texas, on 1 October 1910, the oldest of eight children of John H. Luedecke, a rancher and farmer, and his wife Lizzie. He grew up on the family ranch. He earned a Bachelor of Science degree in chemical engineering from the Agricultural and Mechanical College of Texas in 1932.

Luedecke was commissioned as a second lieutenant in the field artillery reserve on 28 May 1932, and was posted to Camp Bullis, Texas, on Reserve Officers' Training Corps duty. He became a flying cadet on 21 February 1933. After completing his flight training at the Primary Flying School at Randolph Field, Texas, and the Advanced Flying School Bomber course at March Field, California, and Hamilton Field, California, he received a reserve commission as a second lieutenant in the United States Army Air Corps on 20 February 1935.

Luedecke was posted to the 11th Bombardment Squadron at Hamilton Field. The next year he became group operations and intelligence officer of the 7th Bombardment Group there. On 1 October 1938 he was commissioned as a regular second lieutenant in the Army Air Corps, and was posted to the 25th Bombardment Squadron at France Field in the Panama Canal Zone.

== World War II ==
Luedecke was assistant military attaché for Air to Costa Rica, Guatemala, Honduras, El Salvador, Panama and Nicaragua from 23 January 1940 to 19 August 1942. He then became executive air officer at the field office of the Military Intelligence Services, Quarry Heights in the Panama Canal Zone. There he was promoted to captain on 1 February 1942, major on 19 November 1942, and lieutenant colonel on 5 January 1943. That month he returned to the United States as chief of the Operations Branch, Air Control Group, American Intelligence Command at Miami Beach, Florida. The next month he became chief of the Latin American Branch, American Intelligence Command. For his service in Central America, he was awarded the Colombian Order of Boyaca.

On 12 May 1943 he was appointed deputy commander of the 39th Bombardment Group, based at Davis-Monthan Field, Arizona. He became executive officer of the 16th Bombardment Operations Training Wing there on 27 June, with a promotion to colonel on 22 July 1943. In August 1943 he was appointed Chief of the Operations and Training Section of the Army Air Forces in the India-Burma Sector of the China-Burma-India Theater. On 18 August 1944 he was promoted to brigadier general at the age of 33. He became Deputy Chief of Staff in November 1944. In July 1945 he was made Assistant Chief of Air Staff for Plans, Operations, Training and Intelligence in the China Theater. For his service in China, he was awarded the Chinese Order of the Cloud and Banner. He was also given a British mention in despatches and made a Commander of the Order of the British Empire. He was awarded the Legion of Merit on 8 January 1944, with an oak leaf cluster on 25 October 1945, the Bronze Star Medal on 19 November 1945, and the Commendation Ribbon on 29 May 1946. In 1946, Luedecke was awarded the Chinese Air Force Order of Chi'en Yuan by Soong Mei-Ling herself. He was also awarded an honorary Legum Doctor (LL.D.) degree by the A&M College of Texas, now Texas A&M University, in 1946.

== Cold War ==
Luedecke returned to the United States in February 1946, and was assigned to the Joint War Plans Committee in Washington, D.C., as the senior Army Air Force member. On 22 October 1947 he became assistant director of the Joint Strategic Plans Group. On 14 June 1949 he was posted to the Military Liaison Committee of the United States Atomic Energy Commission as executive military secretary. On 16 March 1951 he became the Air Force Deputy Chief of the Armed Forces Special Weapons Project. After the Chief of the Armed Forces Special Weapons Project, Major General Herbert B. Loper, had a heart attack and was forced to retire, Luedecke stepped up to become chief, with the rank of major general.

Starting with Operation Crossroads in 1946, the practice had been to form a joint task force to plan and conduct each series of nuclear weapons tests in the Pacific. When they became more frequent, the Joint Chiefs created Joint Task Force Seven as a permanent body. Luedecke assumed command of Joint Task Force Seven on 1 April 1957. He commanded the task force when it was in charge of nuclear tests on Eniwetok and Johnston Island. On 10 June he was succeeded as Chief of the Armed Forces Special Weapons Project by Rear Admiral Edward N. Parker, but remained commander of Joint Task Force 7. As such, he was responsible for the planning, preparation and conduct of Operation Hardtack I and Operation Hardtack II. For his services, he was awarded the Air Force Distinguished Service Medal.

== Later life ==
Luedecke retired from the Air Force in 1958 to replace Kenneth D. Nichols as General Manager of the Atomic Energy Commission. In 1964 Luedecke was appointed deputy director of the Jet Propulsion Laboratory. Over the next three years he worked on the unmanned Ranger, Mariner, Surveyor and Voyager space exploration programs. For his services to NASA, he was awarded the NASA Exceptional Service Medal in 1968.

That year he returned to Texas A&M University as an associate dean of engineering, engineering research coordinator and associate director of the Texas A&M Engineering Experiment Station. He became acting president for seven months after the death of James Earl Rudder in 1970. He then served as executive vice president for six years. A science building on the campus was named in his honor in 1994.

He died in San Antonio, Texas, on 9 August 1998 and was buried at Fort Sam Houston National Cemetery in San Antonio. He was survived by his wife Isabelle, son, Alvin R. Luedecke Jr., daughters Jan Lee Maynard and Miriam Luedecke, and six sisters.

== Awards and honors ==
- c. 1940 Order of Boyacá (Colombia)
- 1944 Legion of Merit (1945 with bronze oak leaf cluster)
- 1945 Bronze Star Medal
- c. 1945 Commander of the Order of the British Empire
- c. 1945 Mentioned in Despatches (UK)
- c. 1945 Order of the Cloud and Banner (Republic of China)
- 1946 Air Force Order of Chi'en Yuan, Republic of China Air Force
- 1946 Navy Commendation Ribbon
- 1946 Honorary LL.D. degree, A&M College of Texas
- c. 1960 Air Force Distinguished Service Medal
- 1967 Distinguished Alumnus Award, Texas A&M University
- 1968 NASA Exceptional Service Medal

== Notes ==
Academic offices
Preceded by James Earl Rudder	Acting President of Texas A&M University; 1970	Succeeded by Jack Kenny Williams
Military offices
Preceded by Herbert B. Loper	Chief of the Armed Forces Special Weapons Project; 1953–1957	Succeeded by Edward N. Parker
