= Armed Forces Special Weapons Project =

U.S. nuclear weapons agency until 1947

- Armed Forces Special Weapons Project patch
- Active: 1 January 1947 – 6 May 1959
- Country: United States
- Branch: United States Army; United States Air Force; United States Navy
- Role: Special Project
- Part of: Department of Defense
- Garrison/HQ: Washington, D.C.

Commanders
- Notable commanders: Leslie Groves; Kenneth Nichols; Herbert Loper; Alvin Luedecke

Insignia
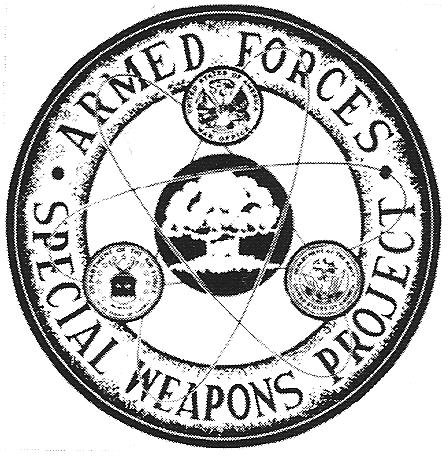
- Seal

The Armed Forces Special Weapons Project (AFSWP) was a United States military agency responsible for those aspects of nuclear weapons remaining under military control after the Manhattan Project was succeeded by the Atomic Energy Commission on 1 January 1947. These responsibilities included the maintenance, storage, surveillance, security and handling of nuclear weapons, as well as supporting nuclear testing. The AFSWP was a joint organization, staffed by the United States Army, United States Navy and United States Air Force; its chief was supported by deputies from the other two services. Major General Leslie R. Groves, the former head of the Manhattan Project, was its first chief.

The early nuclear weapons were large, complex, and cumbersome. They were stored as components rather than complete devices and required expert knowledge to assemble. The short life of their lead-acid batteries and modulated neutron initiators, and the heat generated by the fissile cores, precluded storing them assembled. The large quantity of conventional explosive in each weapon demanded special care be taken in handling. Groves hand-picked a team of regular Army officers, who were trained in the assembly and handling of the weapons. They in turn trained the enlisted soldiers, and the Army teams then trained teams from the Navy and Air Force.

As nuclear weapons development proceeded, the weapons became mass-produced, smaller, lighter, and easier to store, handle, and maintain. They also required less effort to assemble. The AFSWP gradually shifted its emphasis away from training assembly teams, and became more involved in stockpile management and providing administrative, technical, and logistical support. It supported nuclear weapons testing, although after Operation Sandstone in 1948, this was increasingly in a planning and training capacity rather than a field role. In 1959, the AFSWP became the Defense Atomic Support Agency (DASA), a field agency of the Department of Defense.

== Origins ==
Nuclear weapons were developed during World War II by the Manhattan Project, a major research and development effort led by the United States, with participation from the United Kingdom and Canada. From 1942 to 1946, it was under the direction of Major General Leslie R. Groves Jr., of the US Army Corps of Engineers. It created a network of production facilities, most notably for uranium enrichment at Oak Ridge, Tennessee, plutonium production at Hanford, Washington, and weapons research and design at the Los Alamos Laboratory in Los Alamos, New Mexico. The nuclear weapons that were developed were used in the atomic bombings of Hiroshima and Nagasaki in August 1945.

After the war ended, the Manhattan Project supported the nuclear weapons testing at Bikini Atoll as part of Operation Crossroads in 1946. One of Secretary of the Navy James Forrestal's aides, Lewis Strauss, proposed this series of tests to refute "loose talk to the effect that the fleet is obsolete in the face of this new weapon". The nuclear weapons were handmade devices, and a great deal of work remained to improve their ease of assembly, safety, reliability and storage before they were ready for production. There were also many improvements to their performance that had been suggested or recommended, but not possible under the pressure of wartime development.

Groves's biggest concern was about people. Soldiers and scientists wanted to return to their peacetime pursuits, and there was a danger that wartime knowledge would be lost, leaving no one who knew how to handle and maintain nuclear weapons, much less how to improve the weapons and processes. The military side of the Manhattan Project had relied heavily on reservists, as the policy of the Corps of Engineers was to assign regular officers to field commands. The reservists were now eligible for separation. To replace them, Groves asked for fifty West Point graduates from the top ten percent of their classes to man bomb-assembly teams at Sandia Base, where the assembly staff and facilities had been moved from Los Alamos and Wendover Field in September and October 1945. He felt that only such high-quality personnel would be able to work with the scientists who were currently doing the job. They were also urgently required for many other jobs in the postwar Army. When General Thomas T. Handy turned down his request, Groves raised the matter with the Chief of Staff of the Army, General of the Army Dwight D. Eisenhower, who similarly did not approve it. Groves then went over his head too, and took the issue to the Secretary of War, Robert P. Patterson, who agreed with Groves. The personnel manned the 2761st Engineer Battalion (Special), which became a field unit under the Armed Forces Special Weapons Project (AFSWP).

Groves hoped a new, permanent agency would be created to take over the responsibilities of the wartime Manhattan Project in 1945, but passage of the Atomic Energy Act of 1946 through Congress took much longer than expected, and involved considerable debate about the proper role of the military with respect to the development, production and control of nuclear weapons. The act that was signed by President Harry S. Truman on 1 August 1946 created a civilian agency, the United States Atomic Energy Commission (AEC), to take over the functions and assets of the Manhattan Project, but the commissioners were not appointed until October, and AEC did not assume its role until 1 January 1947. In the meantime, the Military Appropriation Act of 1946 gave the Manhattan Project $72.4 million for research and development, and $19 million for housing and utilities at Los Alamos and Oak Ridge.

The Atomic Energy Act provided for a Military Liaison Committee to advise the AEC on military matters, so Patterson appointed Lieutenant General Lewis H. Brereton, who became chairman, along with Major General Lunsford E. Oliver and Colonel John H. Hinds as Army members of the Military Liaison Committee; Forrestal appointed Rear Admirals Thorvald A. Solberg, Ralph A. Ofstie and William S. Parsons as its naval members.

== Organization ==
Chiefs of the Armed Forces Special Weapons Project

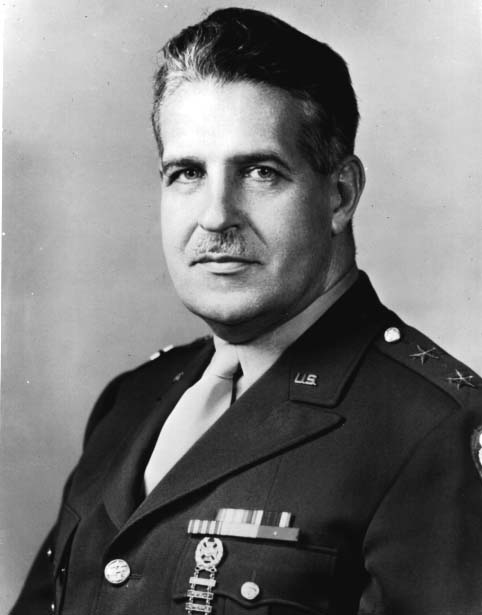
Major General Leslie R. Groves Jr. (1947–1948)

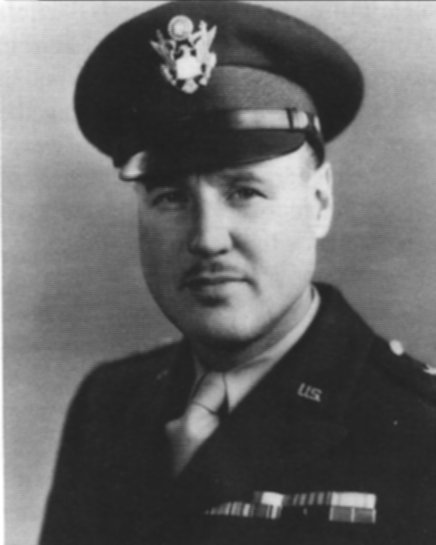
Major General Kenneth D. Nichols (1948–1951)

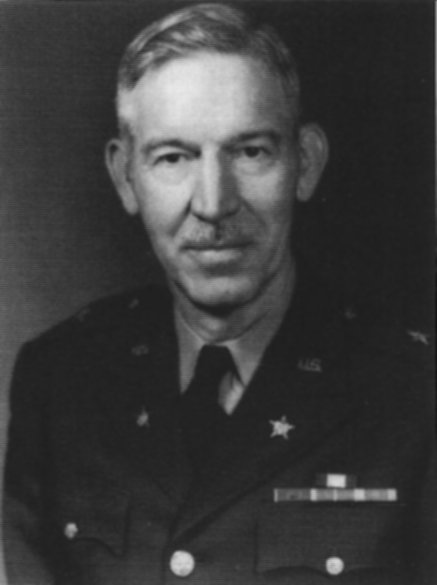
Major General Herbert B. Loper (1952–1953)

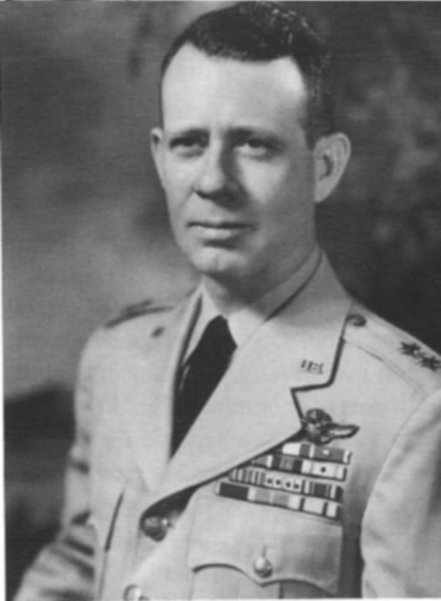
Major General Alvin R. Luedecke (1953–1957)

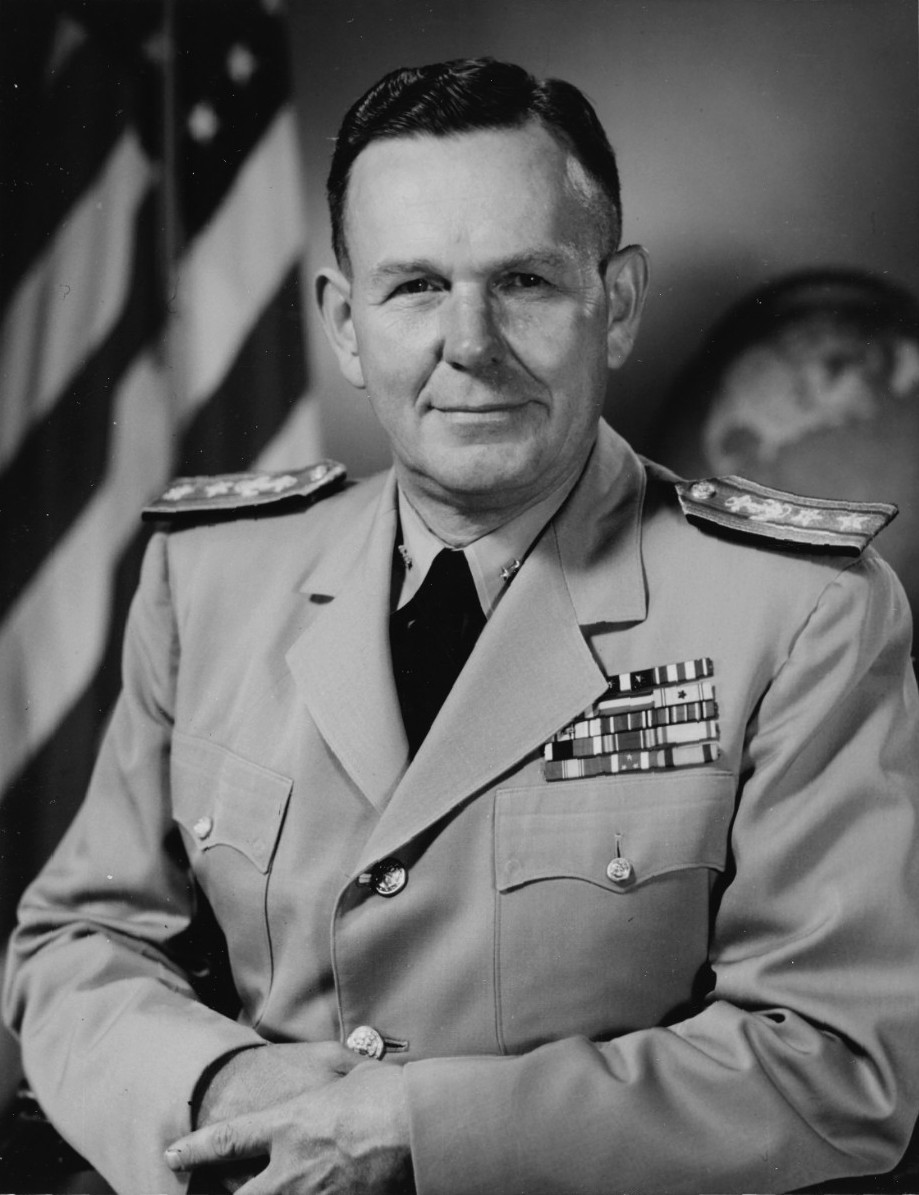
Rear Admiral Edward N. Parker (1957–1959)

Patterson asked Groves to create a new agency to take over responsibility for the aspects of nuclear weapons that still remained under the military. It was to be jointly staffed by the Army and Navy, and on 29 January 1947, Patterson and Forrestal issued a memorandum that formally established the AFSWP. Its chief would be appointed jointly by the Chief of Staff of the Army and the Chief of Naval Operations, along with a deputy from the opposite service. Both would be members of the Military Liaison Committee, because the Atomic Energy Act stipulated that the Military Liaison Committee was the sole military body that dealt with the AEC. In February 1947, Eisenhower and Chief of Naval Operations Fleet Admiral Chester W. Nimitz appointed Groves as head of the AFSWP, with Parsons as his deputy. Accordingly, Groves was appointed to the Military Liaison Committee, although the newly appointed AEC chairman, David E. Lilienthal, told Patterson he did not think it was a good idea, because Groves had run the Manhattan Project by himself for four years, and was not used to having to compromise.

Groves and Parsons drafted a proposed organization and charter for the AFSWP, which they sent to Eisenhower and Nimitz for approval in July 1947. Groves did not get everything he asked for; he wanted a status equal to that of a deputy to the Chief of Staff and Chief of Naval Operations, but the most Eisenhower and Nimitz would allow was a status equal to that of the heads of a technical service, although Groves still reported directly to them. They also characterized his role as a staff post rather than a command, although Groves was already exercising the functions of a commander at Sandia. After the National Security Act of 1947 created an independent Air Force, Groves reported to the Chief of Staff of the Air Force as well, and was given a second deputy chief from the Air Force, Major General Roscoe C. Wilson, who had worked on the Silverplate project during the war.

Groves initially established the headquarters of the AFSWP in the old offices of the Manhattan Project on the fifth floor of the New War Department Building in Washington, DC, but on 15 April 1947 it moved to the Pentagon. As AFSWP headquarters expanded, it filled up its original accommodation, and began using office space in other parts of the building, which was not satisfactory from a security point of view. In August 1949, it moved to 18,000 square feet (1,700 m^{2}) of new offices inside the Pentagon. This included space for a soundproof conference room, a darkroom, and vaults where its records and films were stored.

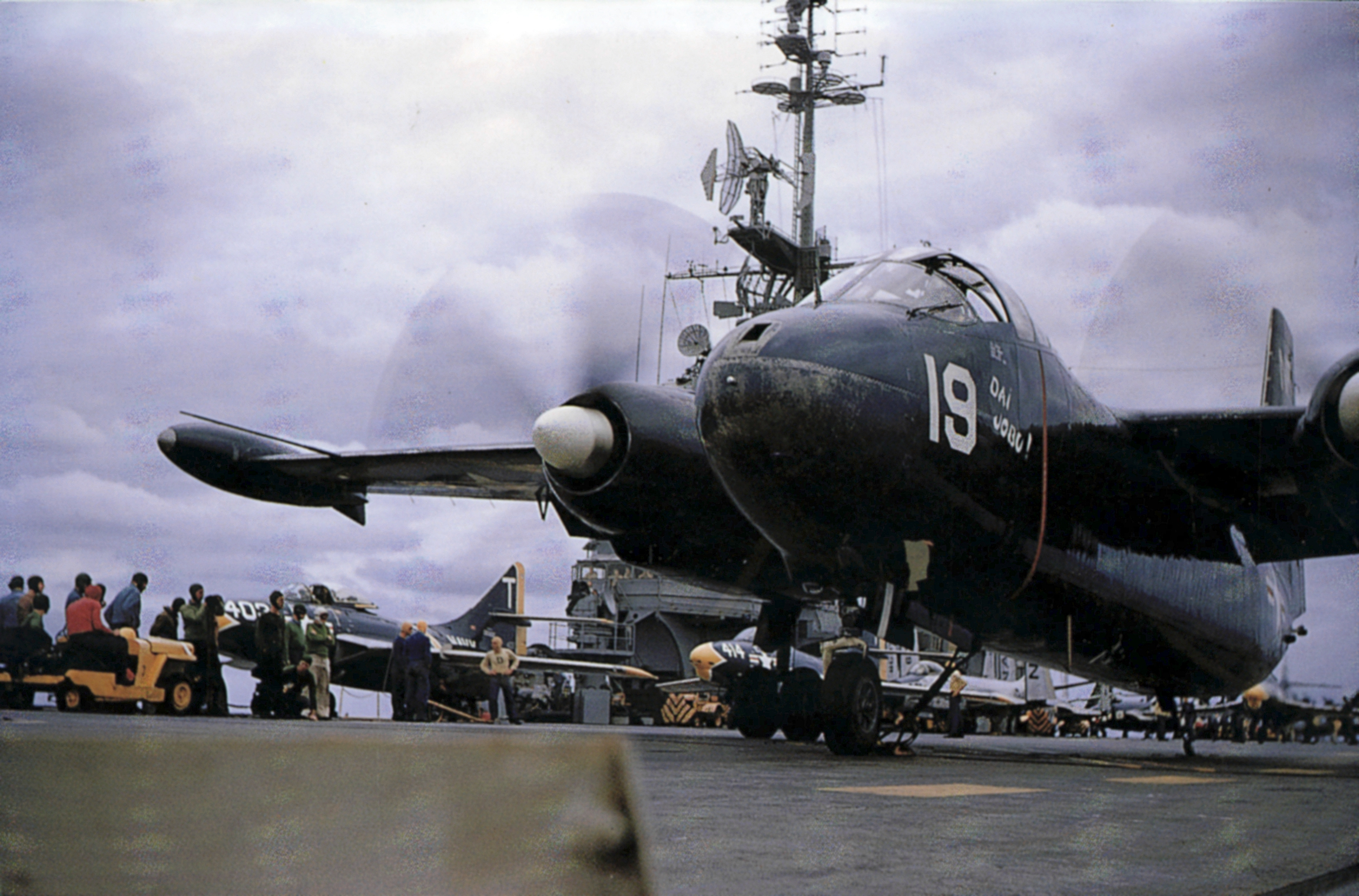
A nuclear capable AJ Savage launching from the aircraft carrier USS Midway in 1955.

The 2761st Engineer Battalion (Special) at Sandia was commanded by Colonel Gilbert M. Dorland, and consisted of a headquarters company, a security company (Company A), a bomb assembly company (Company B) and a radiological monitoring company (Company C), although Company C was never fully formed. For training purposes, Company B was initially divided into command, electrical, mechanical and nuclear groups, but the intention was to create three integrated 36-man bomb assembly teams.

To free the bomb assembly teams from having to train newcomers, a Technical Training Group (TTG) was created under Lieutenant Colonel John A. Ord, a Signal Corps officer with a Doctor of Science degree from Carnegie Institute of Technology who had directed the training of thousands of radar technicians at the Southern Signal Corps School during the war. The battalion was redesignated the 38th Engineer Battalion (Special) in April 1947, and in July it became part of the newly created AFSWP Field Command, under the command of Brigadier General Robert M. Montague. The TTG was soon reporting directly to Montague as well.

The first bomb assembly team was formed in August 1947, followed by a second in December and a third in March 1948. Experience with assembling the bombs convincingly demonstrated the requirement, in Sandia if not in Washington, for a much larger unit. Groves reluctantly approved a 109-man special weapons unit, and Montague converted the three lettered companies of the 38th Engineer Battalion into special weapons units. In 1948, they began training a Navy special weapons unit, as the Navy foresaw delivery of nuclear weapons with its new North American AJ Savage bombers from its Midway-class aircraft carriers. This unit became the 471st Naval Special Weapons Unit on its certification in August 1948. Two Air Force units were created in September and December 1948, which became the 502d and 508th Aviation Squadrons. An additional Army special weapons unit was created in May 1948, and in December, the 38th Engineer Battalion (Special) became the 8460th Special Weapons Group, with all seven special weapons units under its command. The four Army units were then renamed the 111th, 122d, 133d and 144th Special Weapons Units. During the late 1940s the Air Force gradually became the major user of nuclear weapons, and by the end of 1949 it had twelve assembly units and another three in training. The Army had only four and the Navy three, one for each of the Midway-class aircraft carriers.

In March 1948, the Chief of Staff of the Air Force, General Carl Spaatz, proposed that the Air Force take over the AFSWP, on the grounds that the Key West Agreement had given it responsibility for strategic bombing. This would have simplified command of the AFSWP, as it would have been answerable to only one service chief instead of three. The Army cautiously supported the proposal, but the Navy was strongly opposed, fearing that the Air Force's confusion of atomic bombing and strategic bombing would impede or even prevent the Navy from having access to nuclear weapons, which it felt was necessary to accomplish its primary maritime mission. Another series of talks was held at the Naval War College in Newport, Rhode Island, from 20 to 22 August 1948, which resulted in the Newport Agreement, under which the Navy agreed to drop its opposition to the AFSWP being placed under the Air Force temporarily, in return for the Air Force recognizing the Navy's requirement for nuclear weapons. When the Air Force moved to make the temporary arrangement permanent in September 1948, the Army and Navy objected, and the Military Liaison Committee directed that the AFSWP should remain a tri-service organization answerable to the three service chiefs.

== Field operations ==
Groves and the wartime director of the Los Alamos Laboratory, Robert Oppenheimer, had begun the move of ordnance functions to Sandia in late 1945. The laboratory's ordnance-engineering division, known as Z Division, after its first director, Jerrold R. Zacharias, was split between Los Alamos and Sandia. Between March and July 1946, Z Division relocated to Sandia, except for its mechanical engineering (Z-4) section, which followed in February 1947. Z Division worked on improving the mechanical and electrical reliability of the Mark 3 Fat Man bomb, but this work was disrupted by the Crossroads tests.

Mark 3 Fat Man external components: 1. AN 219 contact fuze (four); 2. Archie radar antenna; 3. Plate with batteries (to detonate charge surrounding nuclear components); 4. X-Unit, a firing set placed near the charge; 5. Hinge fixing the two ellipsoidal parts of the bomb; 6. Physics package (see details below); 7. Plate with instruments (radars, baroswitches and timers); 8. Barotube collector; 9. California Parachute tail assembly (0.20-inch (5.1 mm) aluminium sheet)

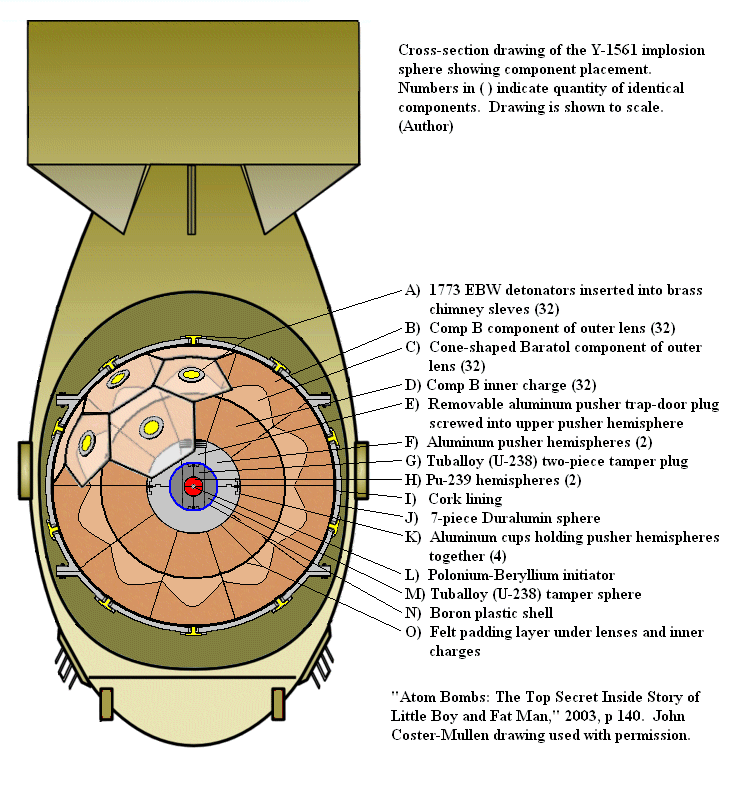
Mark 3 Fat Man internal components.

The 1947 nuclear stockpile consisted of nuclear weapons components, not weapons. Meeting with Truman in April 1947, Lilienthal informed him that not only were there no assembled weapons, there were only a few sets of components and no fully trained bomb-assembly teams. By August 1946, Sandia Base held electrical and mechanical assemblies for about 50 Fat Man bombs, but there were only nine fissile cores in storage. The stockpile of cores grew to 13 in 1947, and 53 in 1948. Oppenheimer noted that the bombs were "still largely the haywire contraptions that were slapped together in 1945". With a half-life of only 140 days, the polonium-beryllium modulated neutron initiators had to be periodically removed from the plutonium pits, tested, and, if necessary, replaced. The cores had to be stored separately from the high-explosive blocks that would surround them in the bomb because they generated enough heat to melt the plastic explosive over time. The heat could also affect the cores themselves, provoking a phase transition to a different allotrope of plutonium. They had to be periodically inspected by technicians wearing gloves and respirators. The bomb's electrical power for its radar fuzes and detonators came from a pair of lead-acid batteries similar to those used in cars. These had to be charged 24 hours before use. After a few days the bomb had to be partially disassembled so they could be re-charged (and, only three days after that, replaced).

The 38th Engineer Battalion's electrical group studied the batteries, the electrical firing systems and the radar fuzes which detonated the bomb at the required altitude. The mechanical group dealt with the exploding-bridgewire detonators and the explosive lenses. The nuclear group moved to Los Alamos to study the cores and initiators. As part of their training, they attended lectures by Edward Teller, Hans Bethe, Lise Meitner and Enrico Fermi. The electrical and mechanical groups at Sandia, although not the nuclear group, completed their training around the end of October 1946 and spent the next month devising the best methods of assembling a Fat Man, drawing up detailed checklists so later bomb assembly teams could be trained. They also drew up a proposed table of organization and equipment for an assembly team. It took two weeks for them to assemble their first bomb in December 1946.

Most of 1947 was spent planning for a field exercise in which a bomb team would deploy to a base and assemble weapons under field conditions. A 20-foot (6.1 m) by 100-foot (30 m) portable building was acquired and outfitted as field workshops that could be loaded onto a C-54 or C-97 transport aircraft. In November 1947, the 38th Engineer Battalion carried out its first major field exercise, Operation Ajax. It drew bomb components, except for fissile cores, from the AEC, and deployed by air to Wendover Field, Utah. This was the home of the 509th Bombardment Group, which was the only unit operating Silverplate B-29 bombers, and therefore the only B-29 group capable of delivering nuclear weapons. To simulate operational conditions, they took a roundabout route via New England and Seattle. Over the following ten days, they assembled bombs and flew training missions with them, including a live drop at the Naval Ordnance Test Station at Inyokern, California.

This was followed by other exercises. In one exercise in March 1948, the base personnel successfully fought off an "attack" by 250 paratroopers from Fort Hood, Texas. In another exercise in November 1948, the 471st Special Weapons Unit flew to Norfolk, Virginia, and practiced bomb assembly on board the Midway-class aircraft carriers.

== Nuclear testing ==
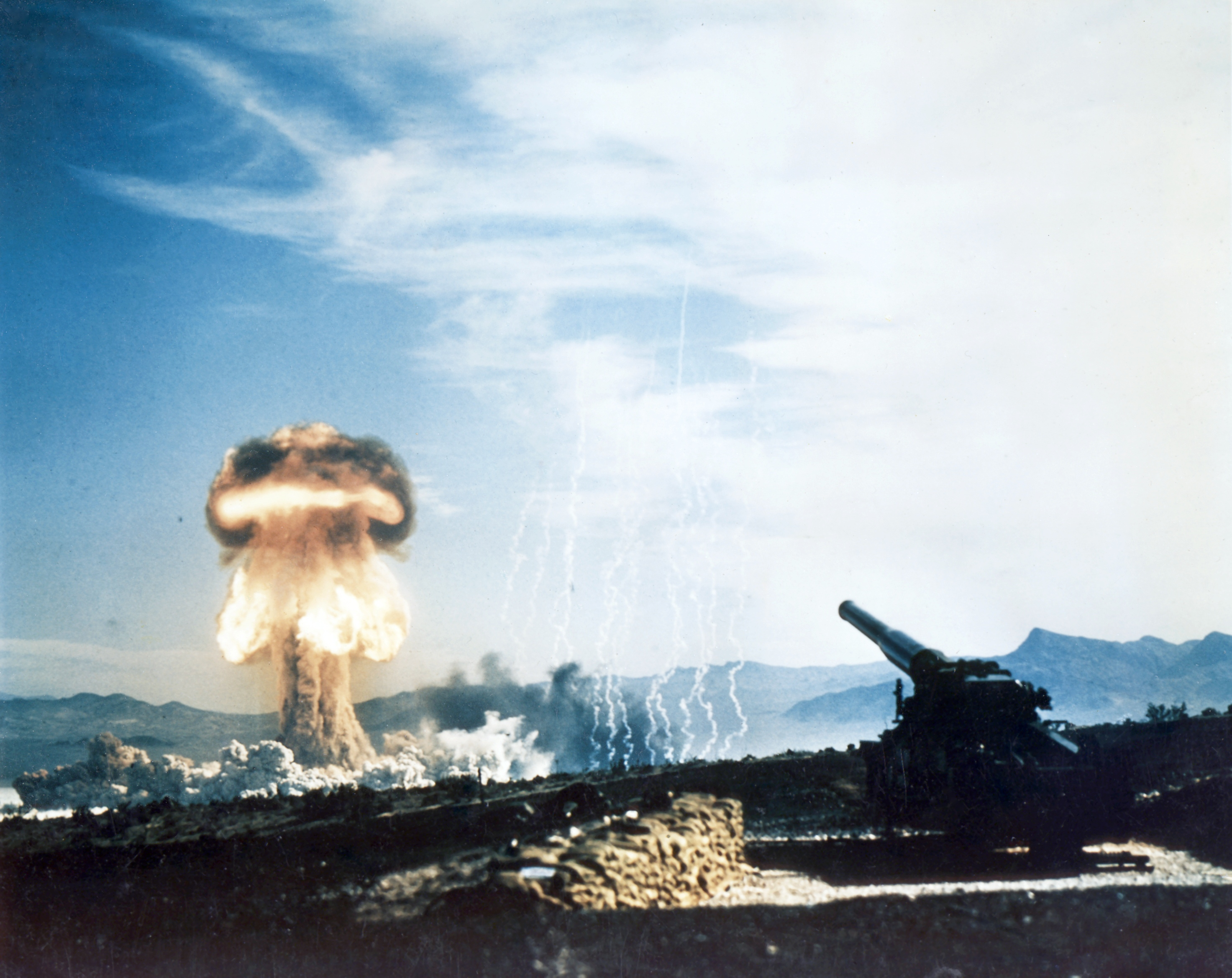
An M65 Atomic Cannon firing during Operation Upshot–Knothole Grable in May 1953.

In addition to assembly of weapons, the AFSWP supported nuclear weapons testing. For Operation Sandstone in 1948, Groves ordered Dorland to fill every possible job with his men. He did this so well that Strauss, now an AEC commissioner, became disturbed at the number of AFSWP personnel who were participating, and feared that the Soviet Union might launch a sneak attack on Enewetak to wipe out the nation's ability to assemble nuclear weapons. The successful testing in Operation Sandstone was a major leap forward. The new Mark 4 nuclear bomb the AEC began delivering in 1949 was a production design that was much easier to assemble and maintain, and enabled a bomb-assembly team to be reduced to just 46 men. Kenneth D. Nichols, the wartime commander of the Manhattan District, now "recommended that we should be thinking in terms of thousands of weapons rather than hundreds".

After Operation Sandstone, only relatively small numbers of AFSWP personnel were involved in nuclear testing. The AFSWP was heavily involved in the planning, preparation and coordination of tests, but it had limited participation in the tests themselves, where the bomb-assembly function was usually undertaken by scientists. During Operation Buster-Jangle, AFSWP personnel showed films and gave lectures to 2,800 military personnel who had been selected to witness the test, explaining what would occur and the procedures to be followed. This was expanded to cater for the more than 7,000 personnel who were involved in Operation Upshot–Knothole in 1953.

== Custody of nuclear weapons ==
When the AEC was formed in 1947 it acquired custody of nuclear components from the Manhattan Project on the understanding that the matter would be reviewed. In November 1947, the Military Liaison Committee requested that custody of the nuclear stockpile be transferred to the military, but Lilienthal believed AEC custody of the stockpile was an important aspect of civilian control of nuclear weapons. He was disturbed that the AFSWP had not informed the AEC in advance of Operation Ajax. For his part, Groves suspected the AEC was not keeping bomb components in the condition in which the military wanted to receive them, and Operation Ajax only confirmed his suspicions. Reviewing the exercise, Montague reported that "under the existing law, with the AEC charged with procurement and custody of all atomic weapons, there was no adequate logistic support for the weapon." He recommended a larger role for the military, a recommendation with which Groves concurred, but was powerless to implement.

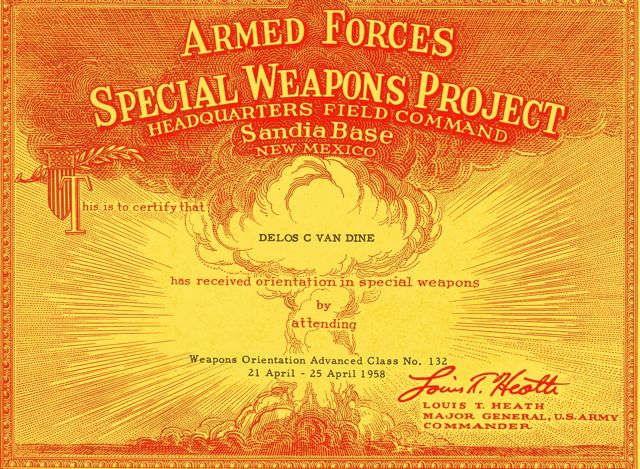
Armed Forces Special Weapons Project certificate for attending Weapons Orientation Advanced Class No. 132 in April 1958.

Groves retired at the end of February 1948, and Nichols was designated as his successor with the rank of major general. At the same time, Forrestal, now the Secretary of Defense, reorganized the Military Liaison Committee. A civilian, Donald F. Carpenter, replaced Brereton as chairman, and there were now two members from each of the three services. On 11 March, Truman summoned Lilienthal, Nichols and Secretary of the Army Kenneth C. Royall to his office, and told them he expected the AFSWP and the AEC to cooperate.

Nichols's position was the same as Groves's and Montague's: that nuclear weapons needed to be available in an emergency, and the men who had to use them in battle needed to have experience with their maintenance, storage and handling. Norris Bradbury, who had replaced Oppenheimer as the director of the Los Alamos Laboratory in December 1945, argued that rapid transfer could be accomplished by improved procedures and that the other difficulties could best be resolved by further development, mostly from the scientists. Forrestal and Carpenter took the matter up with Truman, who issued his decision on 21 July 1948: "I regard the continued control of all aspects of the atomic energy program, including research, development and the custody of atomic weapons as the proper functions of the civil authorities."

With the outbreak of the Korean War in 1950, air transport resources were put under great strain, and it was decided to reduce the requirement for it by pre-positioning non-nuclear components at locations in Europe and the Pacific. That way, in an emergency, only the nuclear components would have to be flown out. In June, Truman ordered the transfer of 90 sets of non-nuclear Mark 4 components to the AFSWP for training purposes. In December, he authorized the carriage of non-nuclear components on board the Midway-class carriers. In April 1951, the AEC released nine Mark 4 weapons to the Air Force in case the Soviet Union intervened in the war in Korea. These were flown to Guam, where they were maintained by the Air Force special weapons unit there. Thus, at the end of 1951, there were 429 weapons in AEC custody and nine held by the Department of Defense.

In the light of this, a new AEC-AFSWP agreement on "Responsibilities of Stockpile Operations" was drawn up in August 1951, but in December, the Joint Chiefs of Staff began a new push for weapons to be permanently assigned to the armed forces, so as to ensure a greater degree of flexibility and a higher state of readiness. On 20 June 1953, Eisenhower, now as president, approved the deployment of nuclear components in equal numbers to non-nuclear components, and the Atomic Energy Act of 1954 amended the sections of the old act that gave exclusive custody to the AEC. By 1959, the nuclear stockpile had grown to 12,305 weapons of which 3,968 were in AEC custody and the remaining 8,337 were held by the Department of Defense. The total yield of the stockpile was now in excess of 19,000 megatons of TNT (79,000 PJ).

As Bradbury had promised, with research and development, nuclear weapons became smaller, simpler and lighter. They also became easier to store, assemble, test and maintain. Thus, while under Eisenhower's New Look policy the Armed Forces became more heavily involved with aspects of nuclear weapons than ever, the role of the AFSWP diminished. It began moving away from training assembly teams, which were increasingly not required, as its primary mission, and became more involved in the management of the rapidly growing nuclear stockpile, and providing technical advice and logistical support. In 1953, the AFSWP Field Command had 10,250 personnel. On 16 October 1953, the Secretary of Defense charged the AFSWP with responsibility for "a centralized system of reporting and accounting to ensure that the current status and location" of all nuclear weapons "will be known at all times". The Atomic Warfare Status Center was created within the AFSWP to handle this mission.

== Conversion to Defense Atomic Support Agency ==
In April 1958, Eisenhower asked Congress for legislation to overhaul the Department of Defense. Over a decade had passed since the legislation which had established it, and he was concerned about the degree of inter-service rivalry, duplication and mismanagement that was evident in many programs. In ballistic missile development, the Soviet Sputnik program had demonstrated that country's technological lead over the United States. The Army and Air Force had rival programs, PGM-19 Jupiter and PGM-17 Thor respectively, and the additional cost to the taxpayers of developing two systems instead of one was estimated at $500 million.

The Defense Reorganization Act of 1958 was signed by Eisenhower in August 1958. It increased the authority of the Secretary of Defense, who was authorized to establish such defense agencies as he thought necessary "to provide for more effective, efficient and economical administration and operation". The first field agency established under the act was the Defense Atomic Support Agency (DASA). The new agency reported to the Secretary of Defense through the Joint Chiefs of Staff, and was given responsibility for the supervision of all Department of Defense nuclear sites. Otherwise, Top Secret military expeditionary installations such as Sandia Base, Manzano Base, Bossier Base Clarksville Base, Killeen Base and Lake Mead Base to name a few, its role and organization remained much the same, and its commander, Rear Admiral Edward N. Parker, remained as its first director. Eisenhower's proposed nuclear testing moratorium ultimately fundamentally changed DASA's mission, as nuclear testing was phased out, Cold War tensions eased, and nuclear disarmament became a prospect.
