= Edward N. Parker =

Edward Nelson Parker
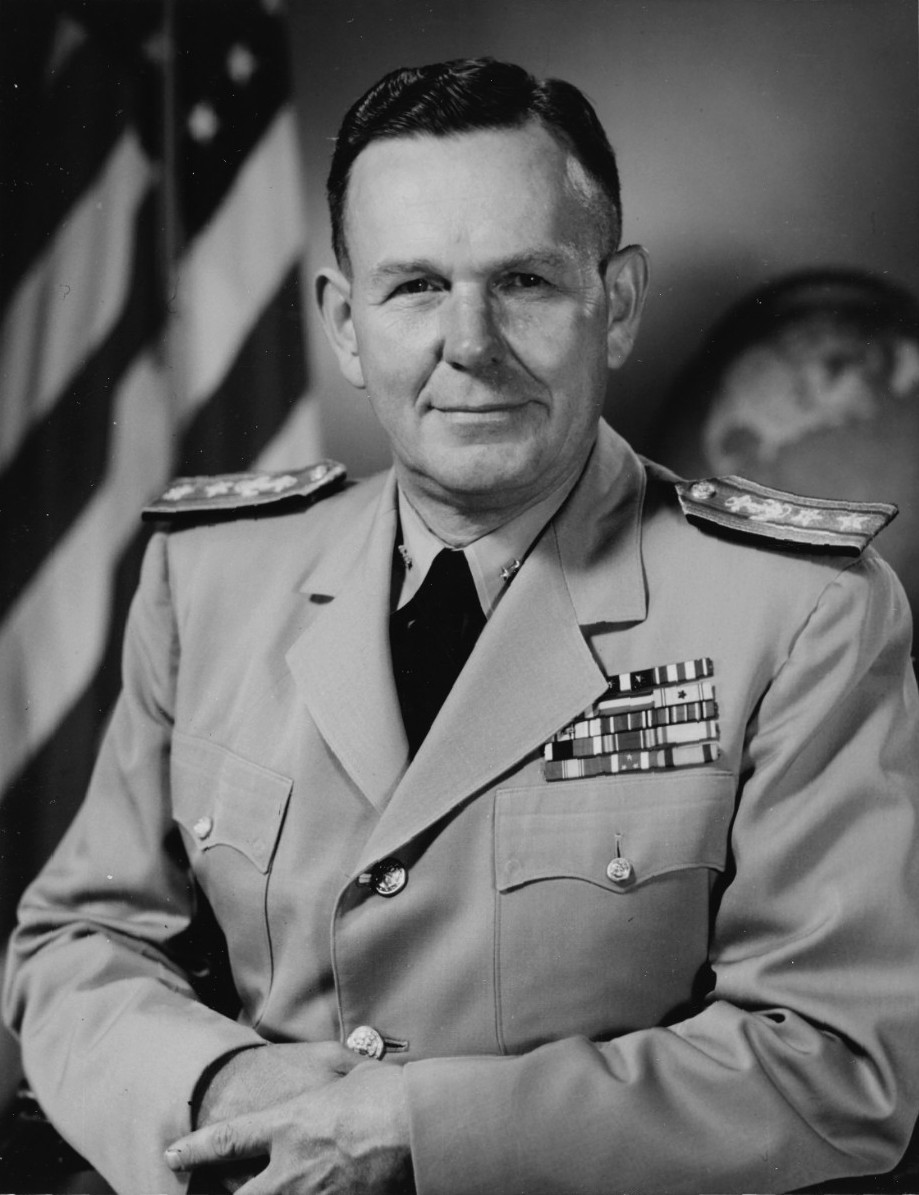
- Born: 26 July 1904; Avalon, Pennsylvania, US
- Died: 15 October 1989 (aged 85); Pompano Beach, Florida, US
- Burial place: United States Naval Academy Cemetery, Annapolis, Maryland, US
- Military career
- Allegiance: United States
- Branch: United States Navy
- Service years: 1925–1963
- Rank: Vice Admiral
- Nickname: Butch
- Service number: 0-59455
- Commands: Armed Forces Special Weapons Project; Cruiser Division 6; USS Newport News; Destroyer Division 15; Destroyer Division 59; USS Parrott
- Conflicts: World War II; Dutch East Indies campaign; Battle of Balikpapan; Battle of Badung Strait; Battle of the Java Sea; Guadalcanal campaign; Naval Battle of Guadalcanal; Chinese Civil War
- Awards: Navy Cross (3); Navy Distinguished Service Medal; Silver Star; Legion of Merit; Commendation Ribbon (2)

Edward Nelson Parker (26 July 1904 – 15 October 1989) was a United States Navy vice admiral. A graduate of the United States Naval Academy at Annapolis, Maryland, class of 1925, he was awarded the Navy Cross three times during World War II. He commanded the Armed Forces Special Weapons Project and its successor, the Defense Atomic Support Agency, from 1957 to 1960, and was Deputy Director, Strategic Target Planning, at Offutt Air Force Base in Nebraska from August 1960 to January 1962 in charge of the development of Single Integrated Operational Plan (SIOP), the joint-service plan for the targeting of nuclear weapons in the event of a war with the Soviet Union. He then served as the first Assistant Director of the Weapons Evaluation and Control Bureau in the Arms Control and Disarmament Agency from January 1962 to November 1962, where he was responsible for organizing and initiating Project Cloud Gap, which tested the feasibility of arms control and disarmament measures.

== Early life ==
Edward Nelson Parker was born in Avalon, Pennsylvania, on 26 July 1904. He was educated at schools in New Orleans, Louisiana, and Louisville, Kentucky, and entered the United States Naval Academy at Annapolis, Maryland, in 1921. He graduated with the class of 1925, and was commissioned as an ensign. He was nicknamed "Butch".

== World War II ==
At time of the Japanese bombing of Pearl Harbor that brought the United States into World War II, Parker, was a lieutenant commander, and the skipper of the destroyer USS Parrott, which was part of the Asiatic Fleet. He was awarded the Navy Cross for his part in the Battle of Balikpapan. His citation read:

The President of the United States of America takes pleasure in presenting the Navy Cross to Lieutenant Commander Edward Nelson Parker (NSN: 0-59455), United States Navy, for extraordinary heroism and distinguished service in the line of his profession as Commanding Officer of the Destroyer USS Parrott (DD-218), and for extreme disregard of personal safety, devotion to duty, courage, leadership and alertness in successfully delivering a determined attack with torpedoes and gunfire during action with the enemy. On the night of 24–25 January 1942, the Parrot, together with the USS Paul Jones (DD-230) and USS John D. Ford (DD-228), delivered an attack upon enemy surface ships off Balikpapan, Borneo, Netherlands East Indies. The composition of the enemy's concentration was known to consist of cruisers, destroyers, and various types of transports and cargo ships. Although sorely outnumbered, the element of surprise was used to compensate for the numerical inequality of forces. By utter disregard of enemy challenges and skillful and precision-like maneuvering, the attacking force was able to so confuse the enemy as to gain admittance to his concentration, sinking and considerably damaging a great part of it by repeated torpedo and gunfire attacks. After remaining in close contact with the enemy for over an hour, and after having expended all torpedoes, an orderly retirement was effected. Lieutenant Commander Parker's skillful handling of the USS Parrott and the manifestly high morale and state of training of his command reflect most favorably on his ability as a commanding Officer and his qualities as a leader. His actions were in keeping with the highest traditions of the United States Naval Service.

The following month he earned a second Navy Cross in the Battle of Badung Strait. His citation read:

The President of the United States of America takes pleasure in presenting a Gold Star in lieu of a Second Award of the Navy Cross to Lieutenant Commander Edward Nelson Parker (NSN: 0-59455), United States Navy, for extraordinary heroism and distinguished service in the line of his profession as Commander, Destroyer Division FIFTY-NINE, in action against enemy Japanese naval forces at Badoeng Straits off the Island of Bali, Netherlands East Indies, on the night of 19–20 February 1942. With the vessels under his command illuminated by the enemy, and under heavy gunfire from enemy Japanese cruisers and destroyers, Lieutenant Commander Parker's capable leadership and skill in coordinating and delivering the attack resulted in scoring several gun hits and at least two torpedo hits on the opposing forces. Following the attack, he displayed excellent judgment and fine seamanship in withdrawing his division from a situation of grave peril without serious damage to his command. Lieutenant Commander Parker's conduct throughout was an inspiration to his officers and men and in keeping with the highest traditions of the United States Naval Service.

A week later he earned the Silver Star in the Battle of the Java Sea. His citation read:

The President of the United States of America takes pleasure in presenting the Silver Star to Captain [then Lieutenant Commander] Edward Nelson Parker (NSN: 0-59455), United States Navy, for conspicuous gallantry and intrepidity as Commander Destroyer Division FIFTY-NINE and in Command, Second Section Destroyer Division FIFTY-EIGHT, during the battle of the Java Sea, 27 February 1942, and in offensive daylight action against the Japanese Battle Line of heavy and light cruisers. Courageous and daring in the face of severe enemy fire, Captain Parker fought his ships boldly throughout this hazardous engagement, going in unsupported and, as a unit of Destroyer Division FIFTY-EIGHT, delivering a successful torpedo attack against two hostile heavy cruisers and seven light cruisers which forced the Japanese to break off the attack and thereby enable the Allied Ships to regain their battle formation. Captain Parker's superb seamanship and outstanding professional skill and the valiant fighting spirit of the officers and men under his command reflect the highest credit upon the United States Naval Service.

In November, Parker earned a third Navy Cross in the Naval Battle of Guadalcanal. His citation read:

The President of the United States of America takes pleasure in presenting a Second Gold Star in lieu of a Third Award of the Navy Cross to Lieutenant Commander Edward Nelson Parker (NSN: 0-59455), United States Navy, for extraordinary heroism and distinguished service in the line of his profession as Commander, Destroyer Division FIFTEEN (DesDiv 15), aboard the Destroyer USS Cushing (DD-376), during an engagement with Japanese naval forces near Savo Island on the night of 12–13 November 1942. The force to which he was attached engaged at close quarters and defeated a superior enemy force. Commander Parker's daring and determination contributed materially to the victory which prevented the enemy from accomplishing his purposes. Lieutenant Commander Parker's inspiring leadership and the valiant devotion to duty of his command contributed in large measure to the outstanding success of these vital missions and reflect great credit upon the United States Naval Service.

This was followed in February 1943 by duty ashore in the Bureau of Ordnance in Washington, D.C., as the head of the Ship Characteristics and Fleet Requirement Section, and then as head of the Planning Engineering Section. He was Assistant Director of the Research and Development Division from February to July 1945, for which he was awarded a Commendation Ribbon.

== Post-war ==
After the war ended, Parker returned to sea duty in the Pacific in November 1945, leading a destroyer squadron in the Allied occupation of Korea and North China until April 1946. Later that year he participated in the Operation Crossroads nuclear test, for which he received a second Commendation Ribbon. In April 1947, Parker, now a captain, became the logistics officer on the staff of the Commander Marianas in Guam, subsequently becoming the chief of staff there. He returned to the United States in September 1948, where he served in the Office of the Chief of Naval Operations in Washington, D.C., until August 1950, when he assumed command of the cruiser, USS Newport News. On 1 September 1952, he was promoted to rear admiral, and became the deputy chief of Armed Forces Special Weapons Project (AFSWP). He returned to sea duty as commander of Cruiser Division 6 in November 1954. He then became special assistant to the Deputy Chief of Naval Operations for Plans and Policies in May 1956.

In June 1957, Parker became the chief of the chief of the AFSWP. He was the first Naval officer appointed to the position. The AFSWP became the Defense Atomic Support Agency (DASA) in May 1959, and Parker became its first director. He was promoted to vice admiral in 1960, and served as the Deputy Director, Strategic Target Planning, at Offutt Air Force Base in Nebraska from August 1960 to January 1962. In this role he was in charge of the development of the Single Integrated Operational Plan (SIOP), the joint-service plan for the targeting of nuclear weapons in the event of a war with the Soviet Union. He then served as the first Assistant Director of the Weapons Evaluation and Control Bureau in the Arms Control and Disarmament Agency from January 1962 to November 1962. He responsible for organizing and initiating Project Cloud Gap, which tested the feasibility of arms control and disarmament measures. He was awarded the Legion of Merit and the Navy Distinguished Service Medal for this service. He retired in 1963.

== Later life ==
The day after he retired, Parker set out for Florida with his wife, Elizabeth Denny née Hunter, in their 40-foot (12 m) cabin cruiser. Thereafter, they would spend their winters each year in Pompano Beach, Florida, and return to Annapolis in the spring. In 1969, they decided to stay Florida permanently, moving to Lighthouse Point, Florida. Parker became the commodore of the Lighthouse Point Yacht Club, and the president of the Pompano Beach Gold Coast Council of the Navy League. Elizabeth died in 1981, and he married Louise Wildanger Southworth the following year. He acquired a stepson and two stepdaughters through this marriage.

Parker died at his home in Lighthouse Point on 15 October 1989, and was buried in the United States Naval Academy Cemetery in Annapolis.
