= Project Cloud Gap =

Project Cloud Gap: Demonstrated Destruction of Nuclear Weapons was a program run by the United States Department of Defense and the Arms Control and Disarmament Agency from 1963 to 1967 (or 1969, according to other sources) whose purpose was to "test the technical feasibility of potential arms control and disarmament measures". Arms control agreements discussed between the United States and the Soviet Union would involve on-site inspections, and such techniques - which involved giant drilling rigs and helicopter overflights to detect secret underground testing - were field-tested by Cloud Gap. The program was abandoned after a helicopter crash during a mock inspection exercise killed several team members.

Cloud Gap's aborted work culminated in Field Test 34, "an extensive mock dismantlement exercise" which demonstrated two things: if any party to a treaty attempted to cheat, the risk of detection was significant, and the party that cooperated and allowed for on-site inspection would see "significant amounts of classified information be put at risk and invariably lost".
