= List of castles in Scania =

This is a list of castles in Scania, most of which were originally built between 1100 and 1600 while Scania was a Danish province. Since 1658, Scania has been a historic province of Sweden. Many of the castles were built or rebuilt in the 16th century and remodelled in the 19th century, often in Dutch Renaissance style.

== Alphabetical order ==
=== Castles and abbeys ===
- Alnarp Castle
- Bäckaskog Castle
- Barsebäck Castle
- Bellinga Castle
- Bjärsjöholm Castle
- Bjärsjölagård Castle
- Björnstorp Castle
- Bollerup Castle
- Borgeby
- Börringe Abbey
- Bosjö Abbey
- Charlottenlund Castle
- Christinehof Castle
- Dybäck Castle
- Ellinge Castle
- Gärsnäs Castle
- Glimmingehus
- Gyllebo Castle
- Häckeberga Castle
- Hanaskog Castle
- Herrevad Abbey
- Hjularöd Castle
- Högestad
- Hovdala Castle
- Jordberga Castle
- Kärnan
- Karsholm Castle
- Klågerup Castle
- Knutstorp Castle
- Krageholm Castle
- Krapperup Castle
- Kronovall Castle
- Kulla Gunnarstorp Castle
- Kvesarum Castle
- Landskrona Citadel
- Löberöd Castle
- Malmöhus Castle
- Maltesholm Castle
- Marsvinsholm Castle
- Näsbyholm Castle
- Örenäs Castle
- Örtofta Castle
- Örup Castle
- Osbyholm Castle
- Össjö Castle
- Övedskloster Manor
- Ovesholm Castle
- Pålsjö Castle
- Råbelöv Castle
- Rönneholm Castle
- Rosendal Castle, Helsingborg
- Rössjöholm Castle
- Sinclairsholm Castle
- Skarhult Castle
- Skabersjö Castle
- Smedstorp Castle
- Snogeholm Castle
- Sofiero Palace
- Sövdeborg Castle
- Svaneholm Castle
- Svenstorp Castle
- Tomarps Kungsgård Castle
- Toppeladugård Castle
- Torup Castle
- Tosterup Castle
- Trolle-Ljungby Castle
- Trolleholm Castle
- Trollenäs Castle
- Tunbyholm Castle
- Vannaröd Castle
- Vegeholm Castle
- Viderup Castle
- Vittskövle Castle
- Vrams Gunnarstorp Castle
- Wanås Castle

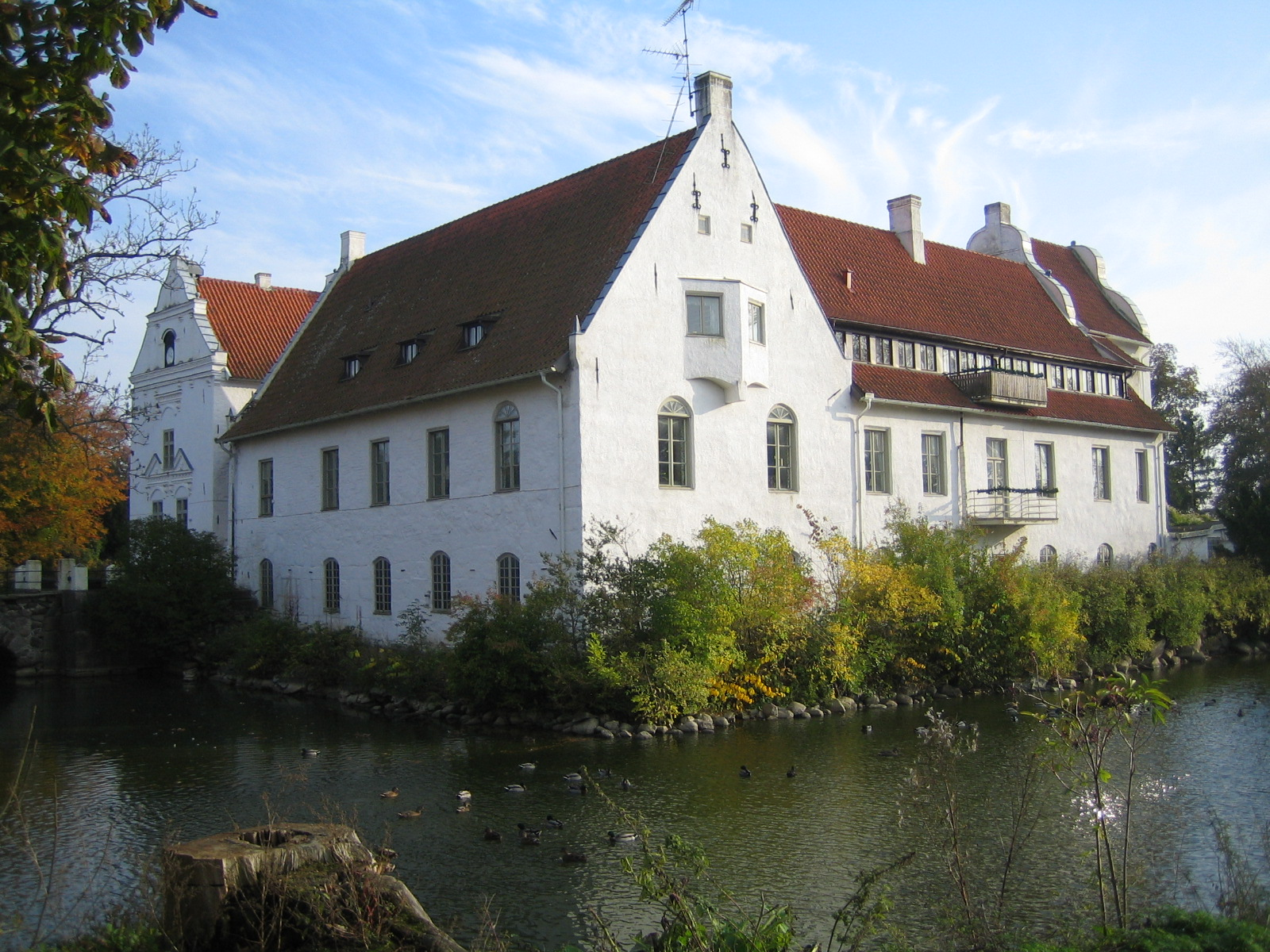
Dybäck Castle.

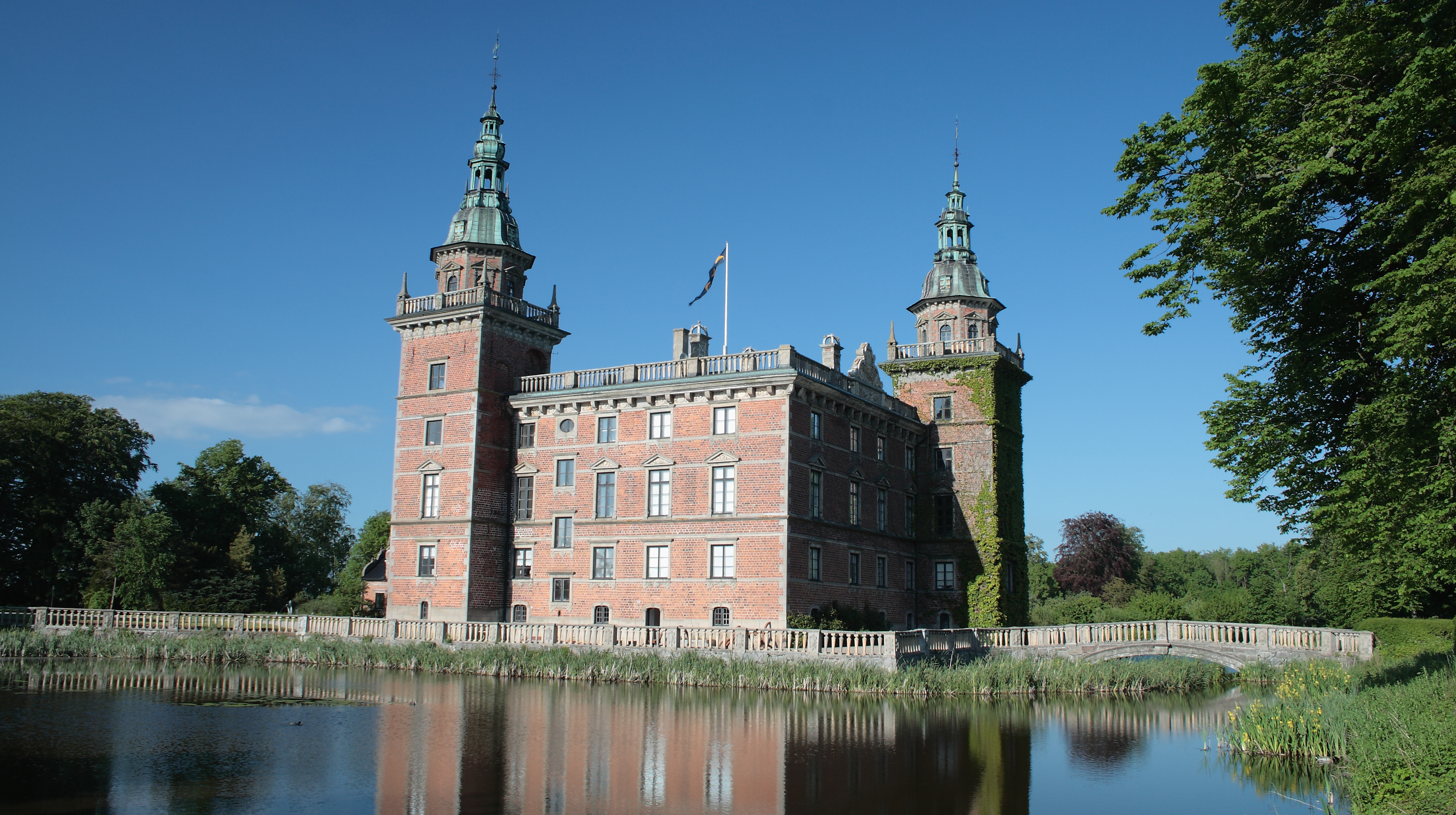
Marsvinsholm Castle.

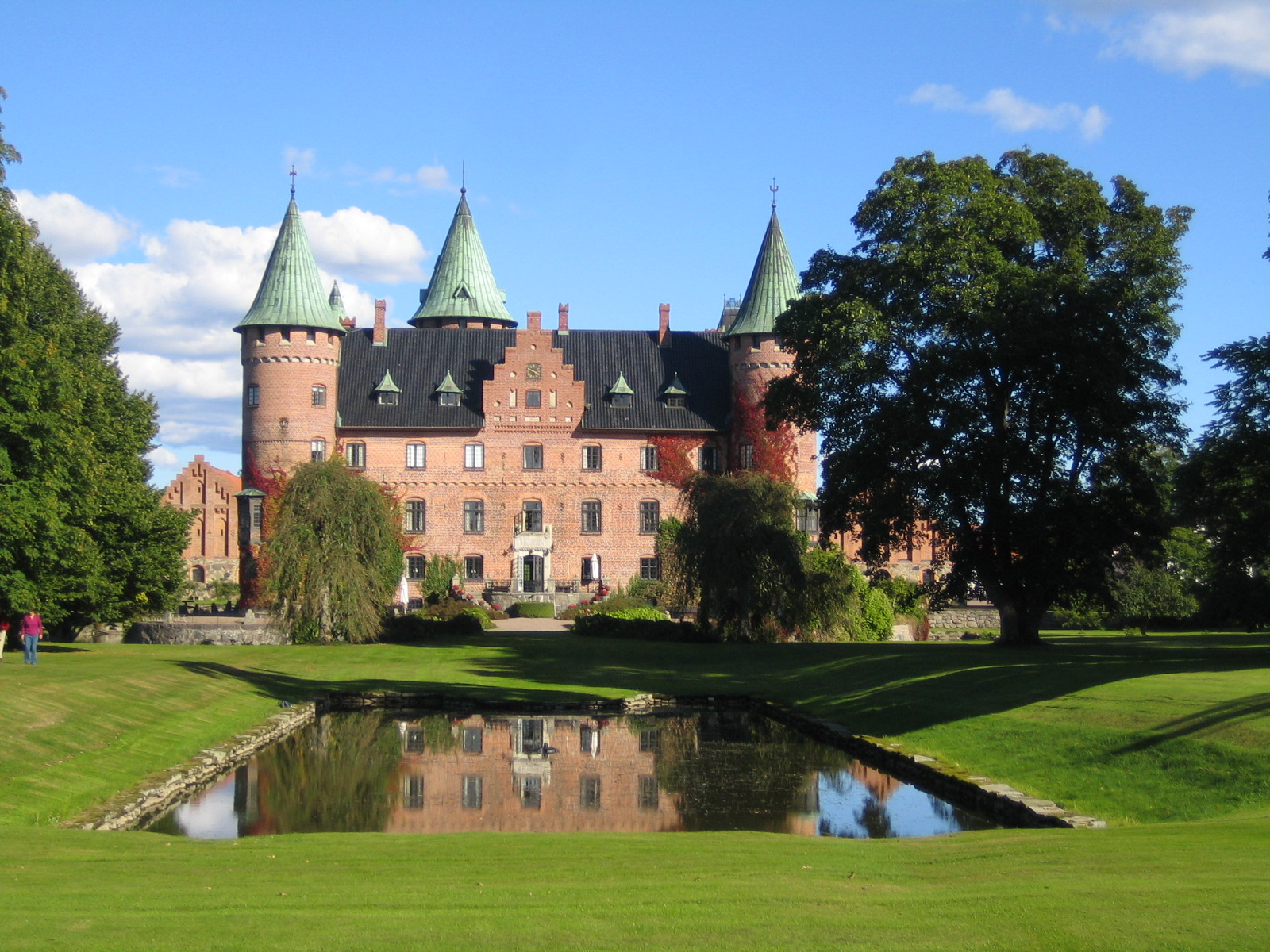
Trolleholm Castle.

=== Castle ruins ===
- Gladsaxehus
- Lillö Ruin
- Lindholmen Castle
- Månstorp Gables
- Uraniborg

== Ordered by municipality ==
Ängelholm Municipality

- Össjö Castle
- Rössjöholm Castle
- Vegeholm Castle

Åstorp Municipality

- Tomarps Kungsgård Castle

Bjuv Municipality

- Vrams Gunnarstorp Castle

Eslöv Municipality

- Ellinge Castle
- Hjularöd Castle
- Löberöd Castle
- Örtofta Castle
- Rönneholm Castle
- Skarhult Castle
- Trollenäs Castle
- Viderup Castle

Hässleholm Municipality

- Hovdala Castle
- Sinclairsholm Castle
- Vannaröd Castle

Helsingborg Municipality

- Kärnan
- Kulla Gunnarstorp Castle
- Pålsjö Castle
- Rosendal Castle
- Sofiero Palace

Höganäs Municipality

- Krapperup Castle

Höör Municipality

- Bosjökloster

Hörby Municipality

- Kvesarum Castle
- Osbyholm Castle

Kävlinge Municipality

- Barsebäck Castle

Klippan Municipality

- Herrevad

Kristianstad Municipality

- Bäckaskog Castle
- Karsholm Castle
- Lillö Ruin
- Maltesholm Castle
- Ovesholm Castle
- Råbelöv Castle
- Trolle-Ljungby Castle
- Vittskövle Castle

Landskrona Municipality

- Landskrona Citadel
- Örenäs Castle
- Uraniborg

Lomma Municipality

- Alnarp Castle
- Borgeby Castle

Lund Municipality

- Björnstorp Castle
- Häckeberga Castle
- Svenstorp Castle
- Toppeladugård Castle

Malmö Municipality

- Malmö Castle

Östra Göinge Municipality

- Hanaskog Castle
- Wanås Castle

Simrishamn Municipality

- Gärsnäs Castle
- Gladsaxehus
- Glimmingehus
- Gyllebo Castle

Sjöbo Municipality

- Bjärsjölagård Castle
- Övedskloster Manor
- Snogeholm Castle
- Sövdeborg Castle

Skurup Municipality

- Dybäck Castle
- Näsbyholm Castle
- Svaneholm Castle

Svalöv Municipality

- Knutstorp Castle
- Trolleholm Castle

Svedala Municipality

- Börringe
- Klågerup Castle
- Lindholmen Castle
- Skabersjö Castle
- Torup Castle

Tomelilla Municipality

- Bollerup
- Christinehof Castle
- Kronovall Castle
- Örup Castle
- Smedstorp Castle
- Tosterup Castle
- Tunbyholm Castle

Trelleborg Municipality

- Jordberga Castle

Vellinge Municipality

- Månstorp

Ystad Municipality

- Bellinga Castle
- Bjärsjöholm Castle
- Charlottenlund Castle
- Högestad Castle
- Krageholm Castle
- Marsvinsholm Castle

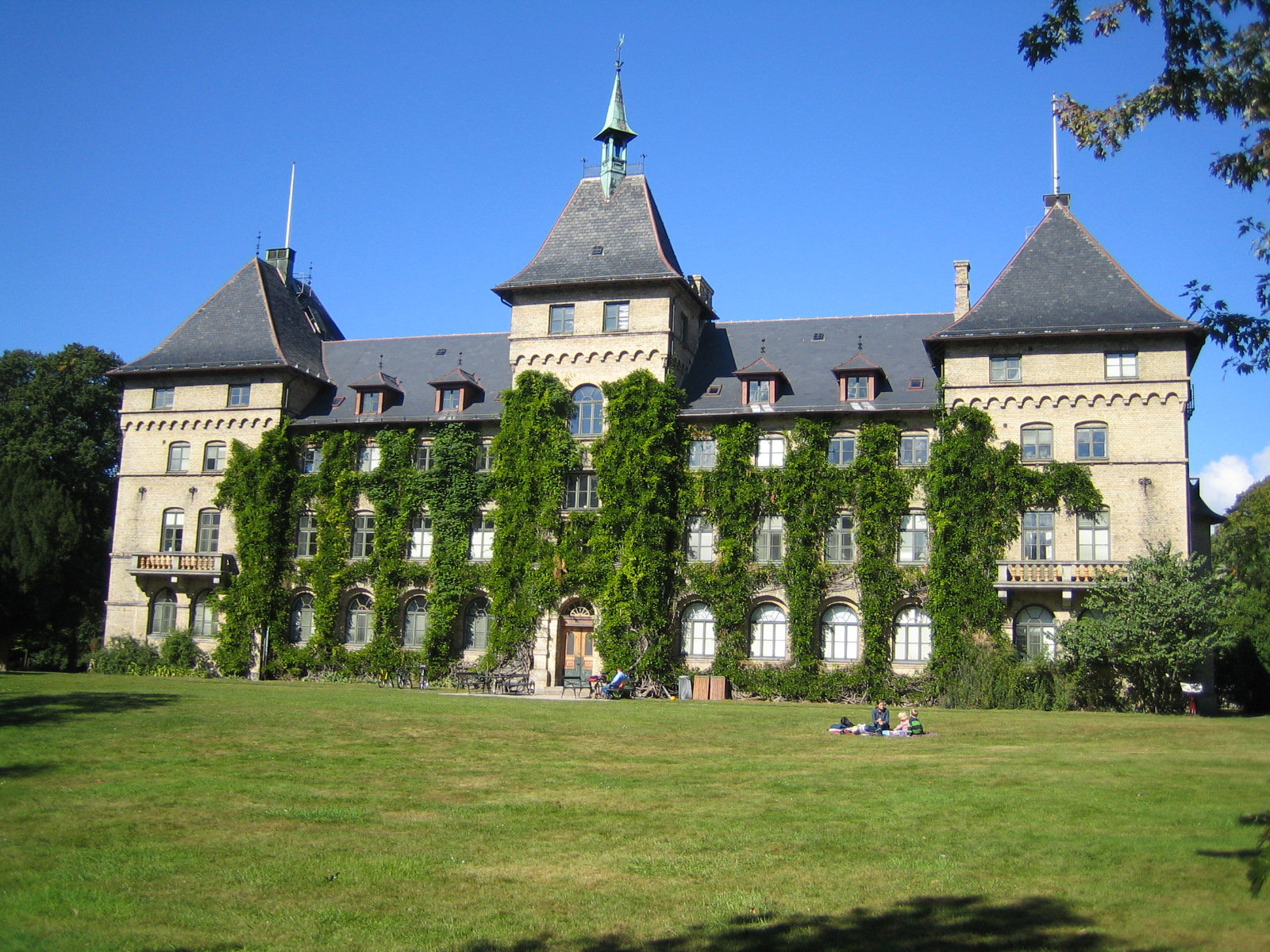
Alnarp Castle.

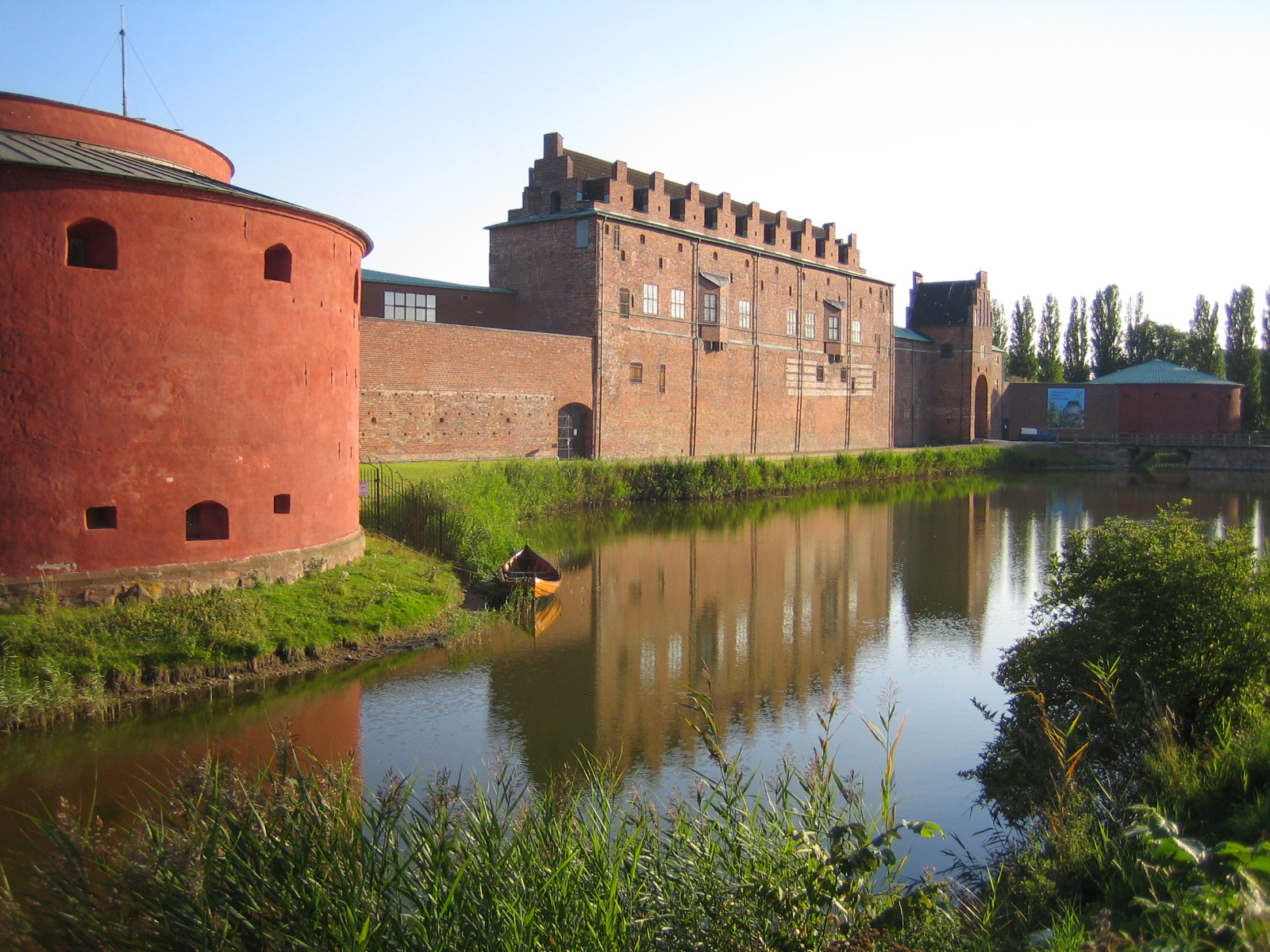
Malmöhus Castle.

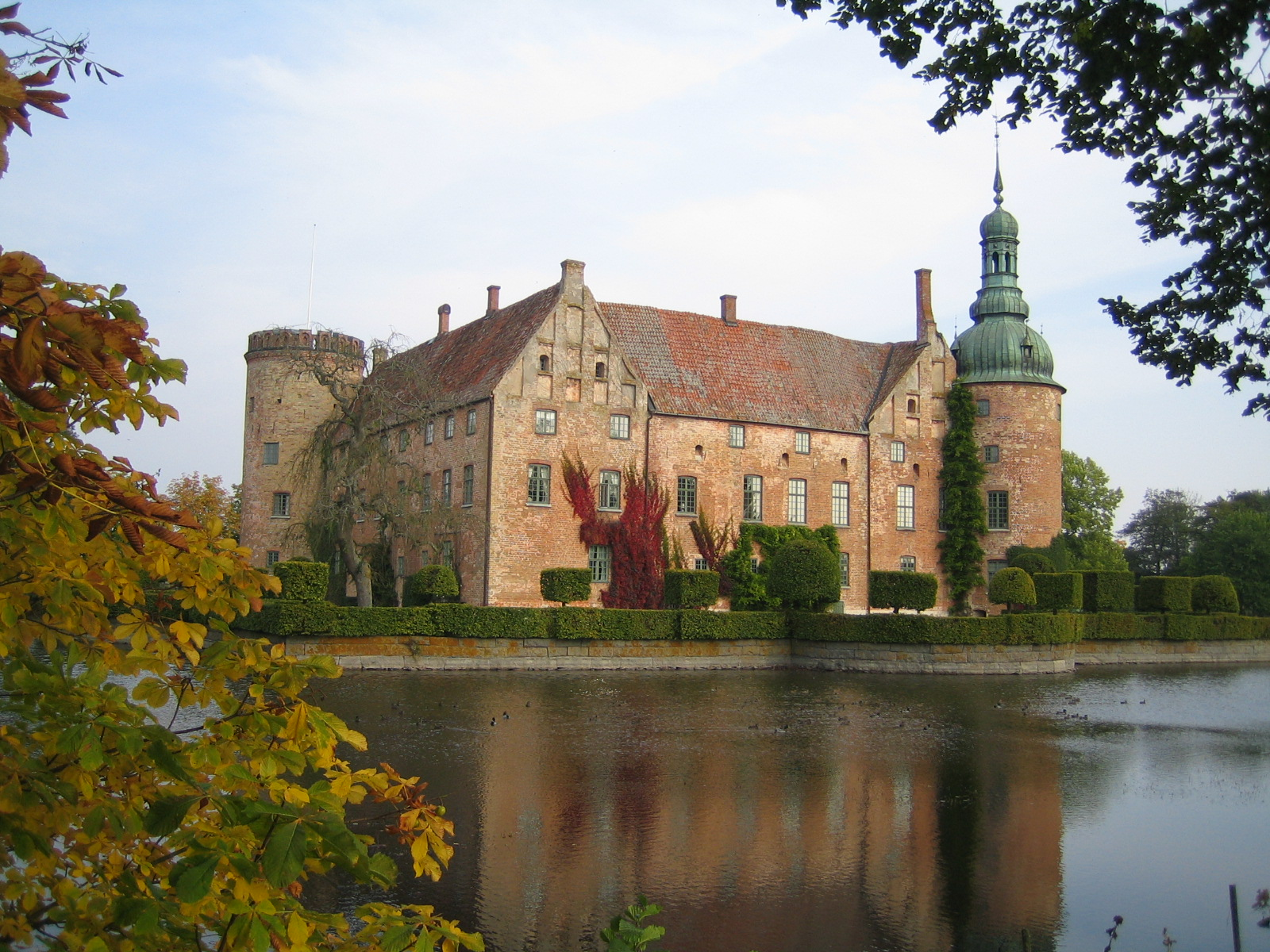
Vittskövle Castle.

== See also ==
List of castles in Sweden

== Gallery of Scanian castles ==
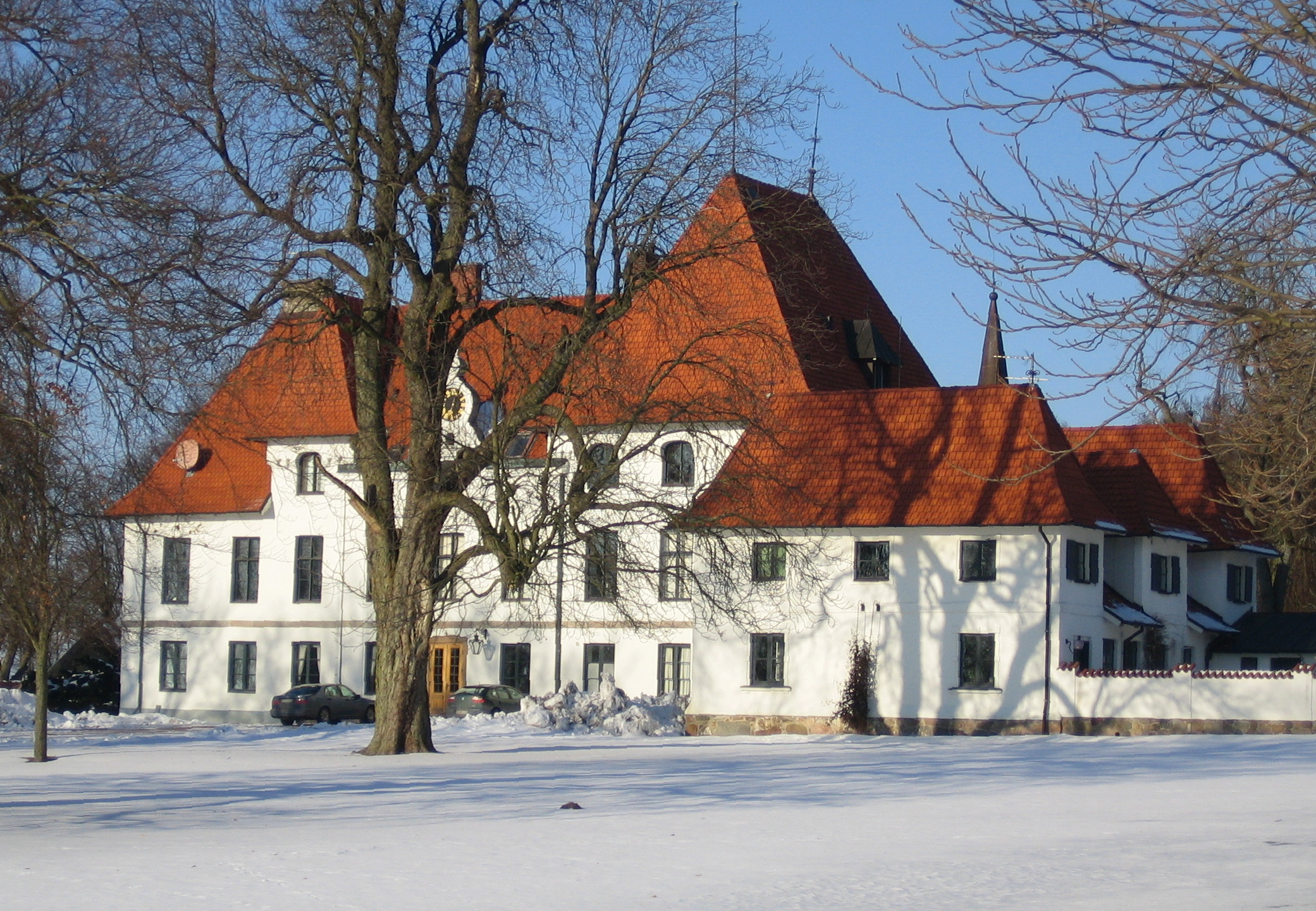
Björnstorp Castle

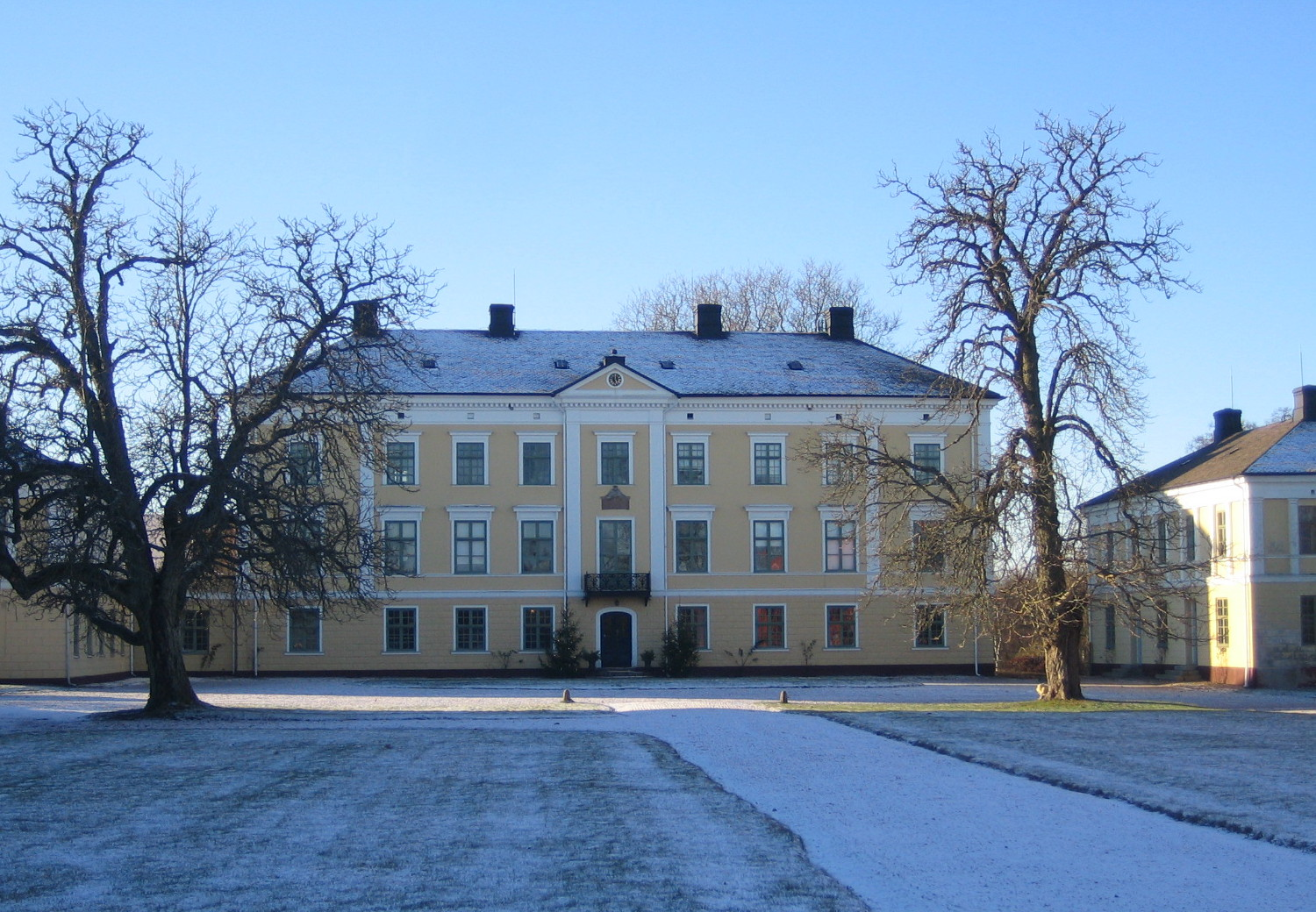
Börringe Abbey

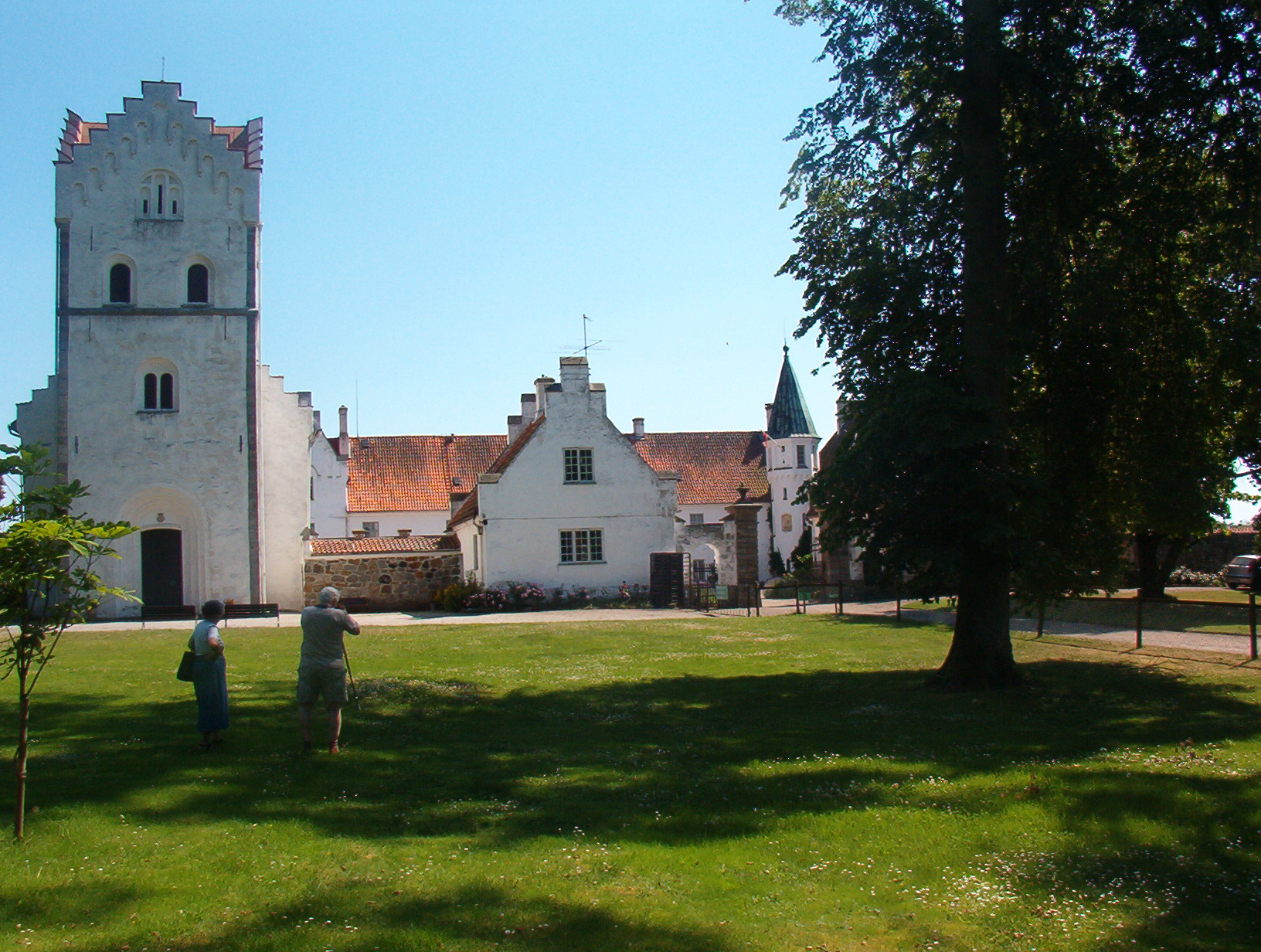
Bosjö Abbey

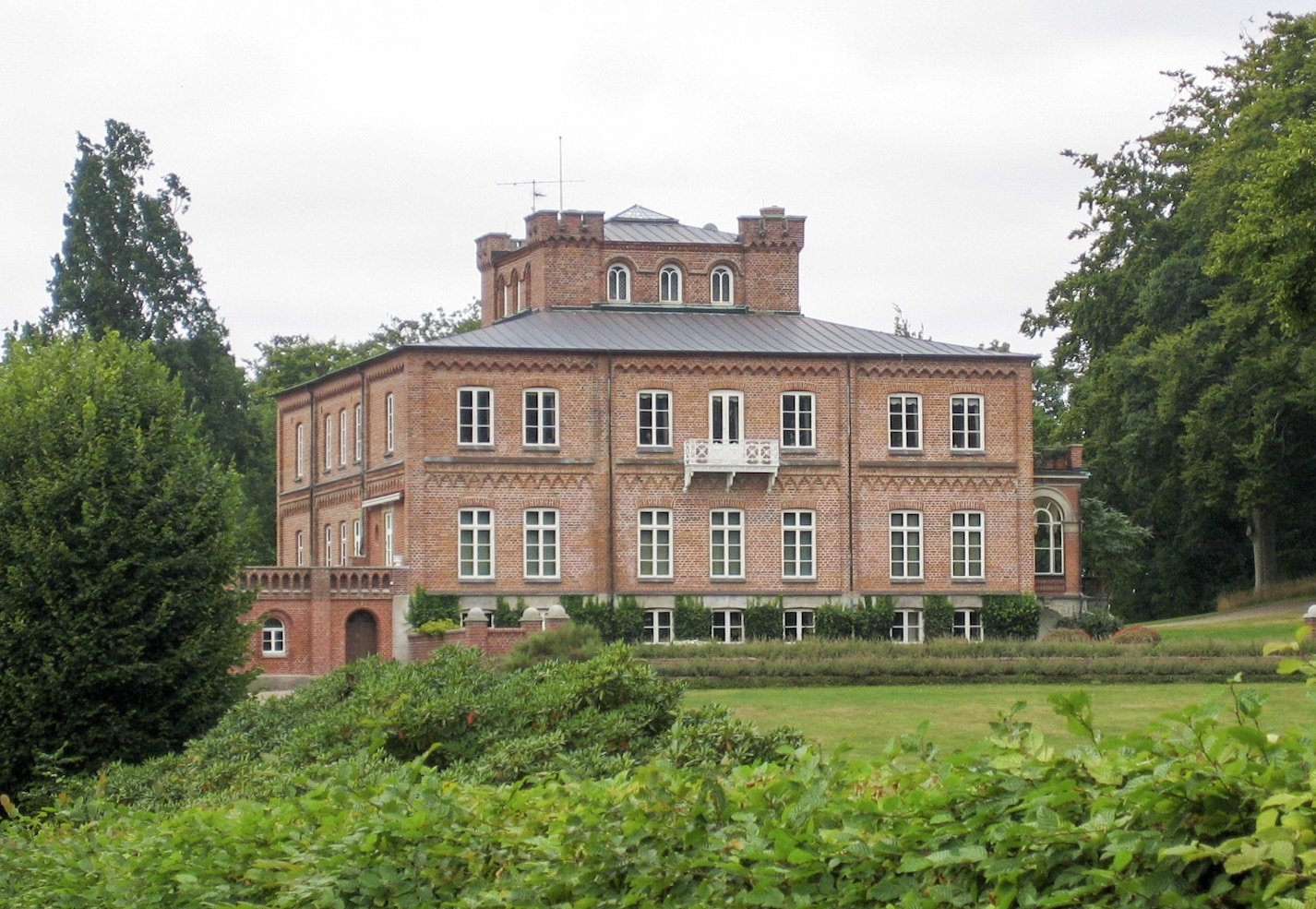
Charlottenlund Castle

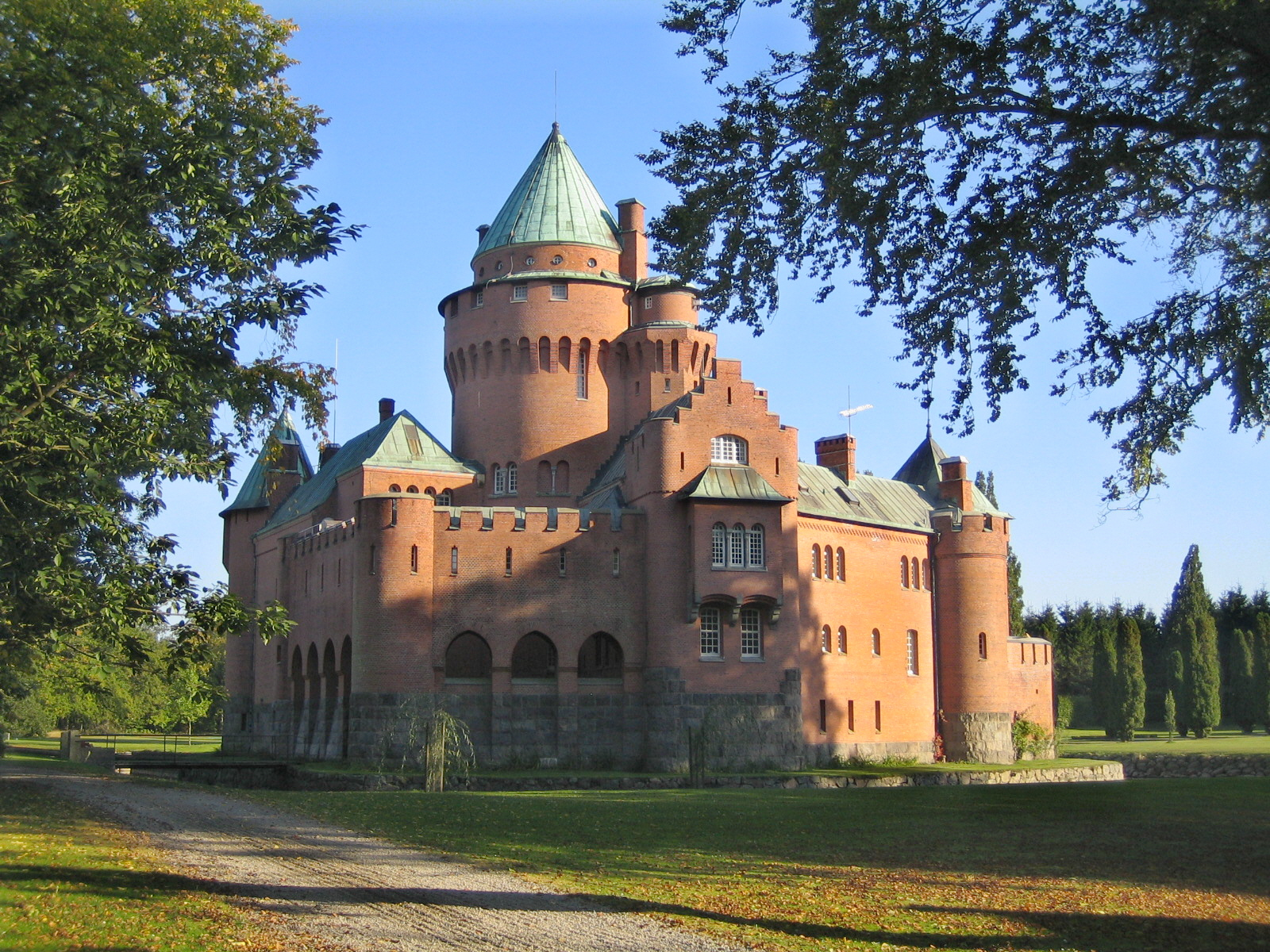
Hjularöd Castle

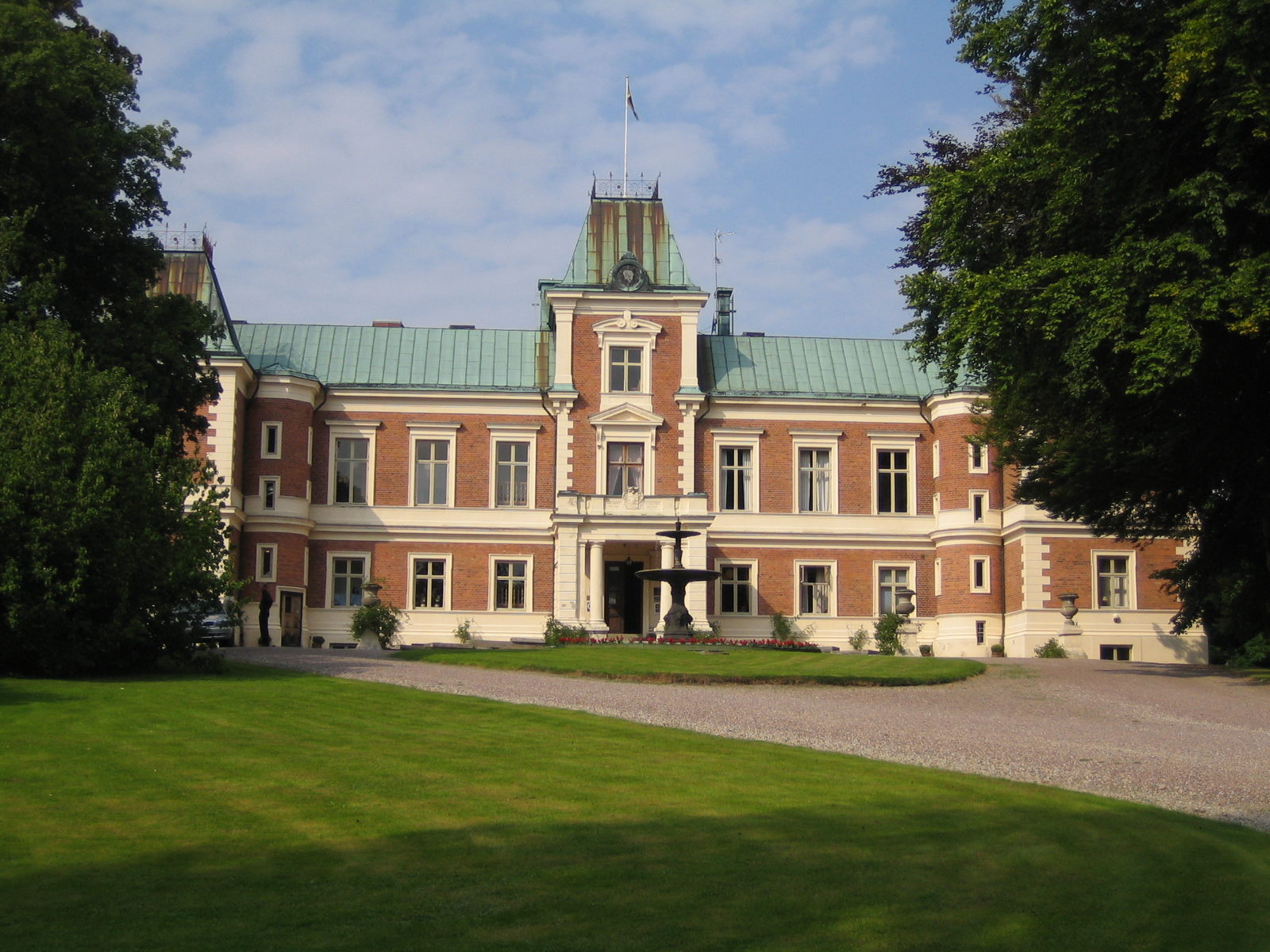
Häckeberga Castle

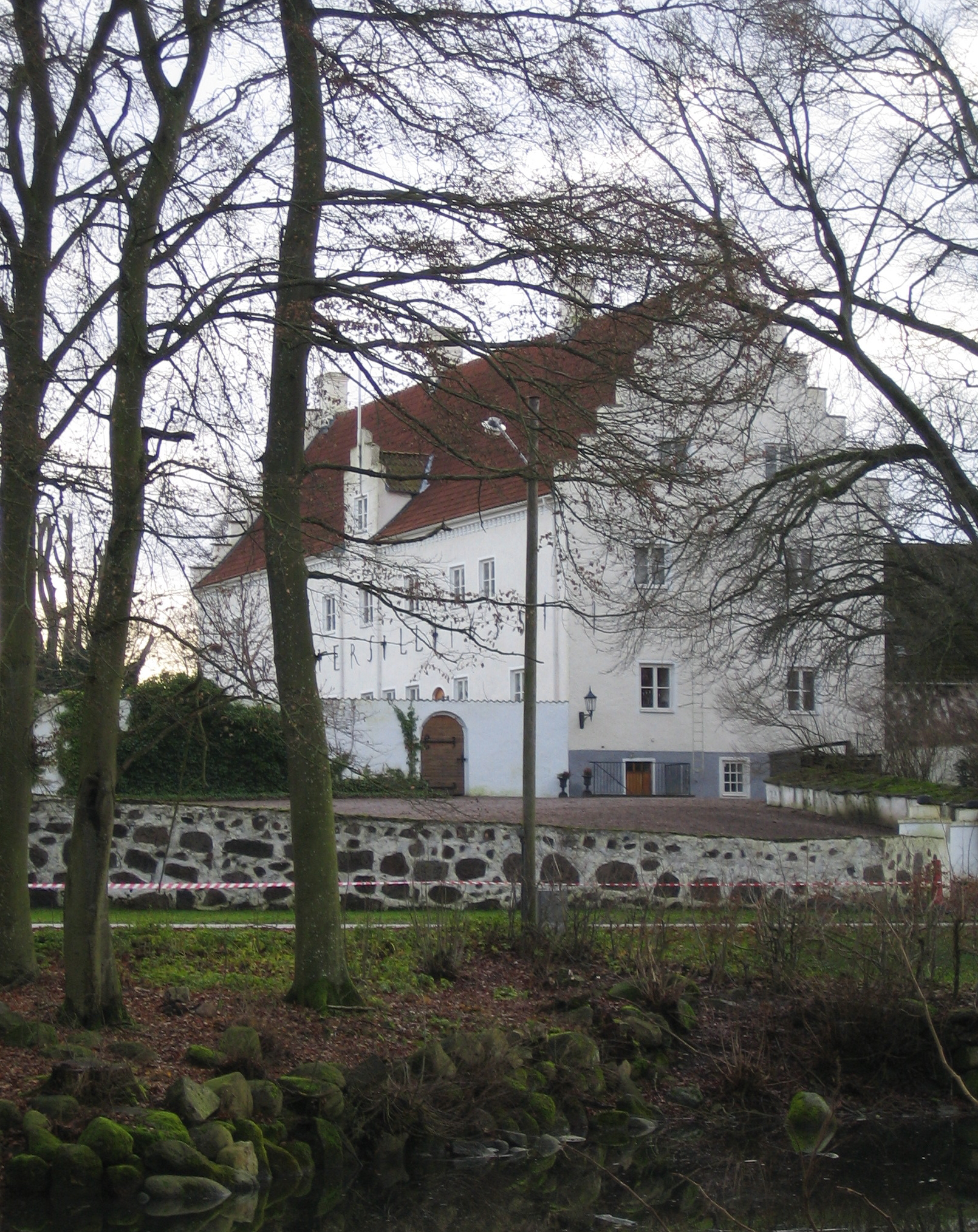
Högestad Castle

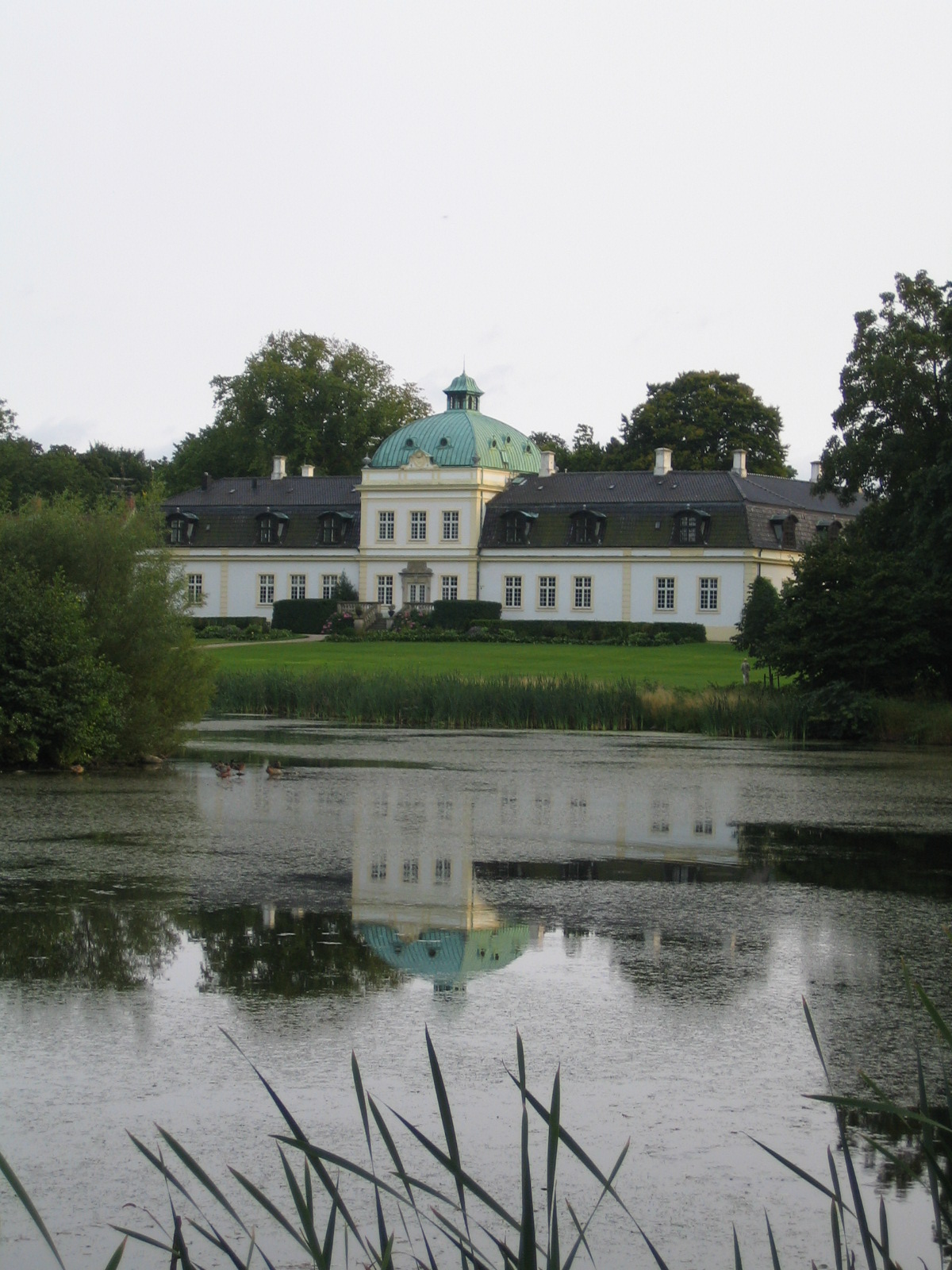
Jordberga Castle

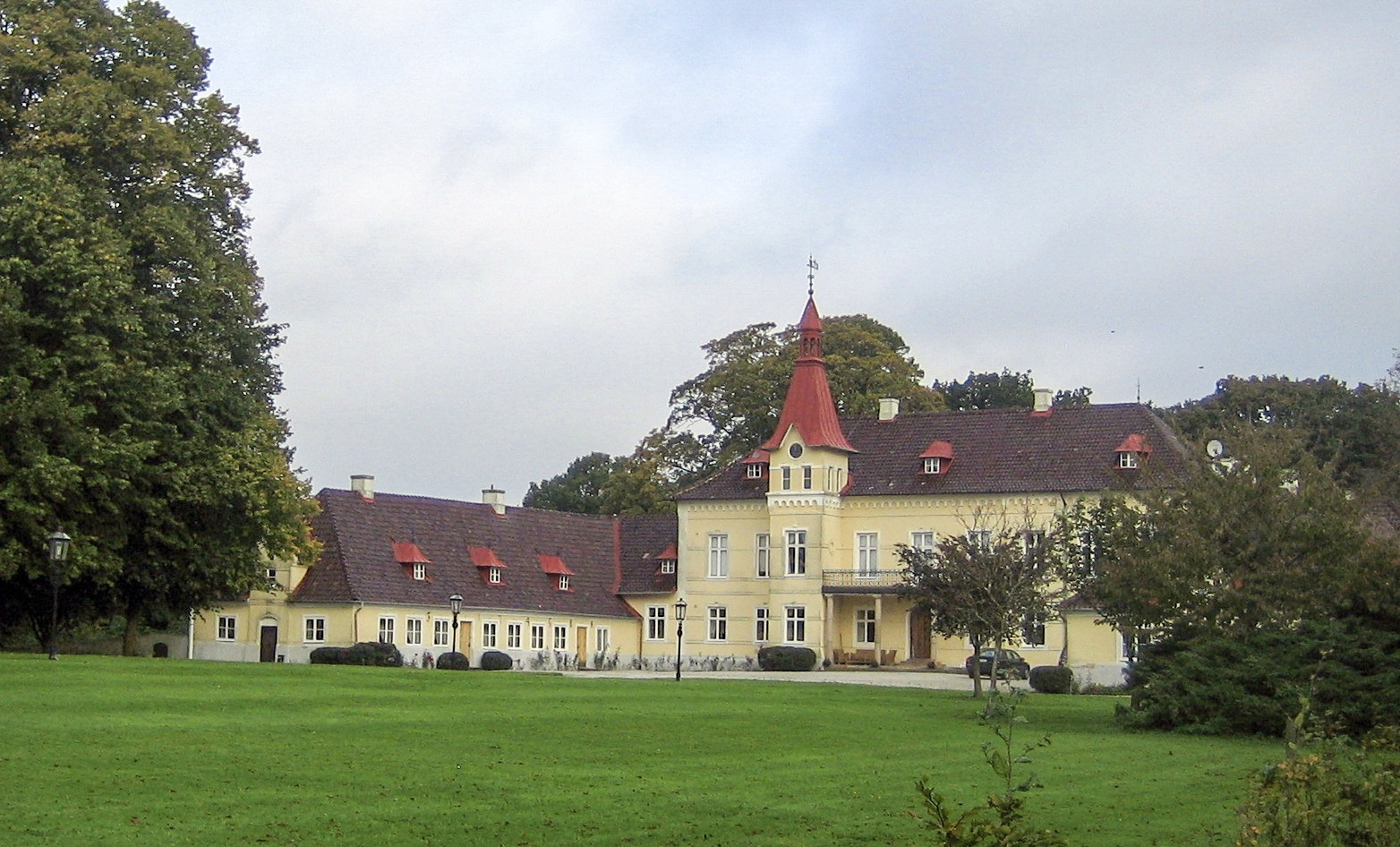
Klågerup Castle

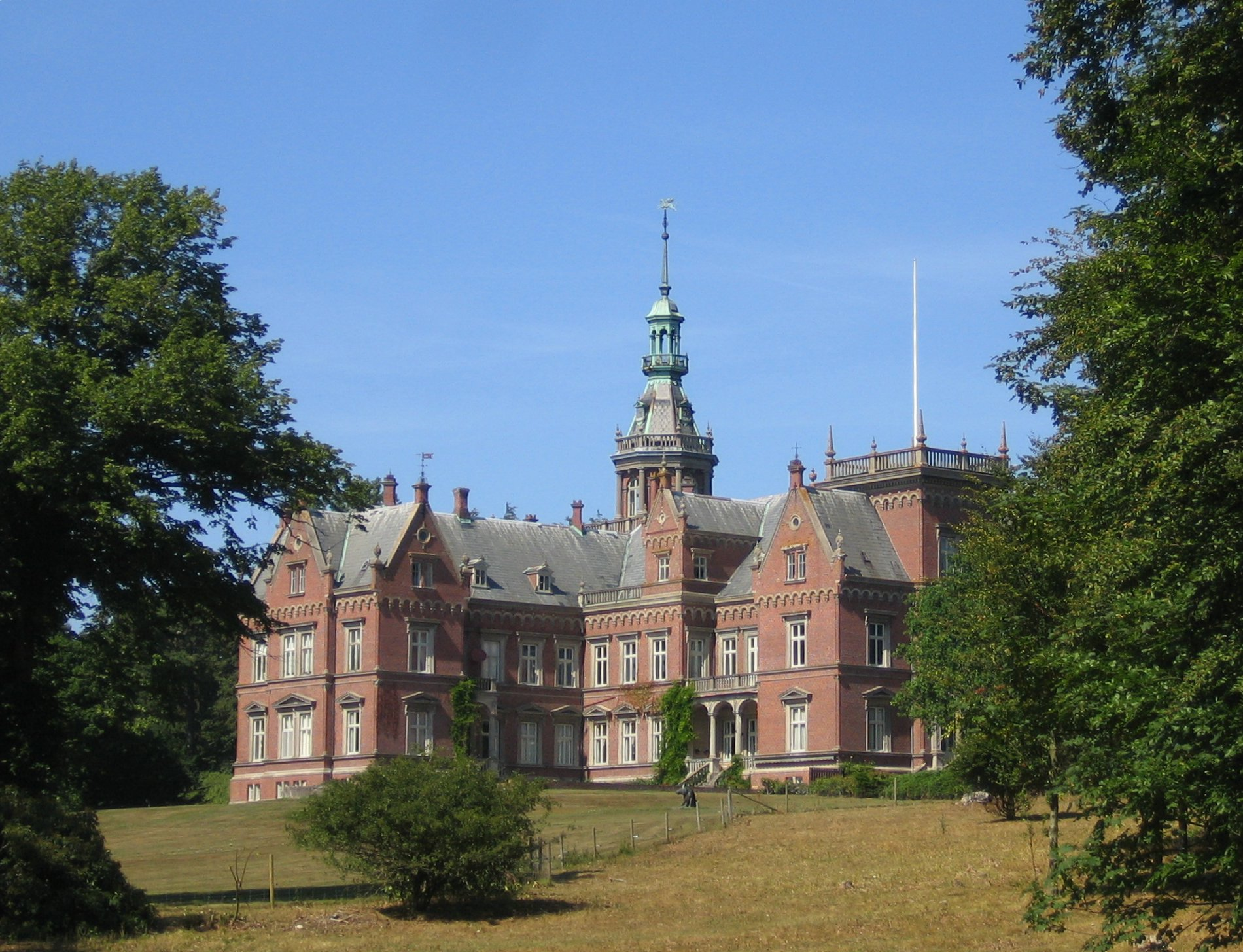
Kulla Gunnarstorp Castle

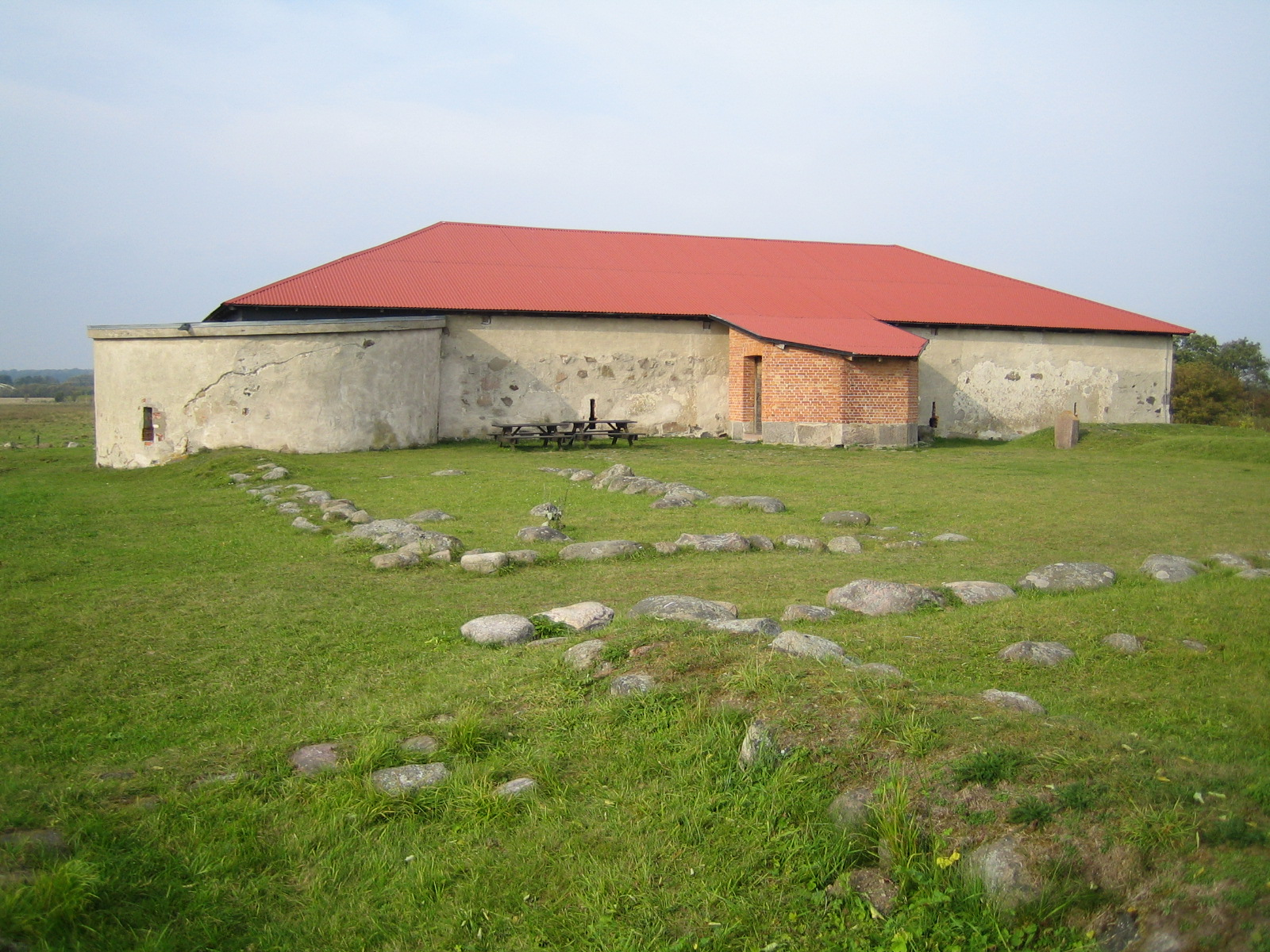
Lillö Ruin

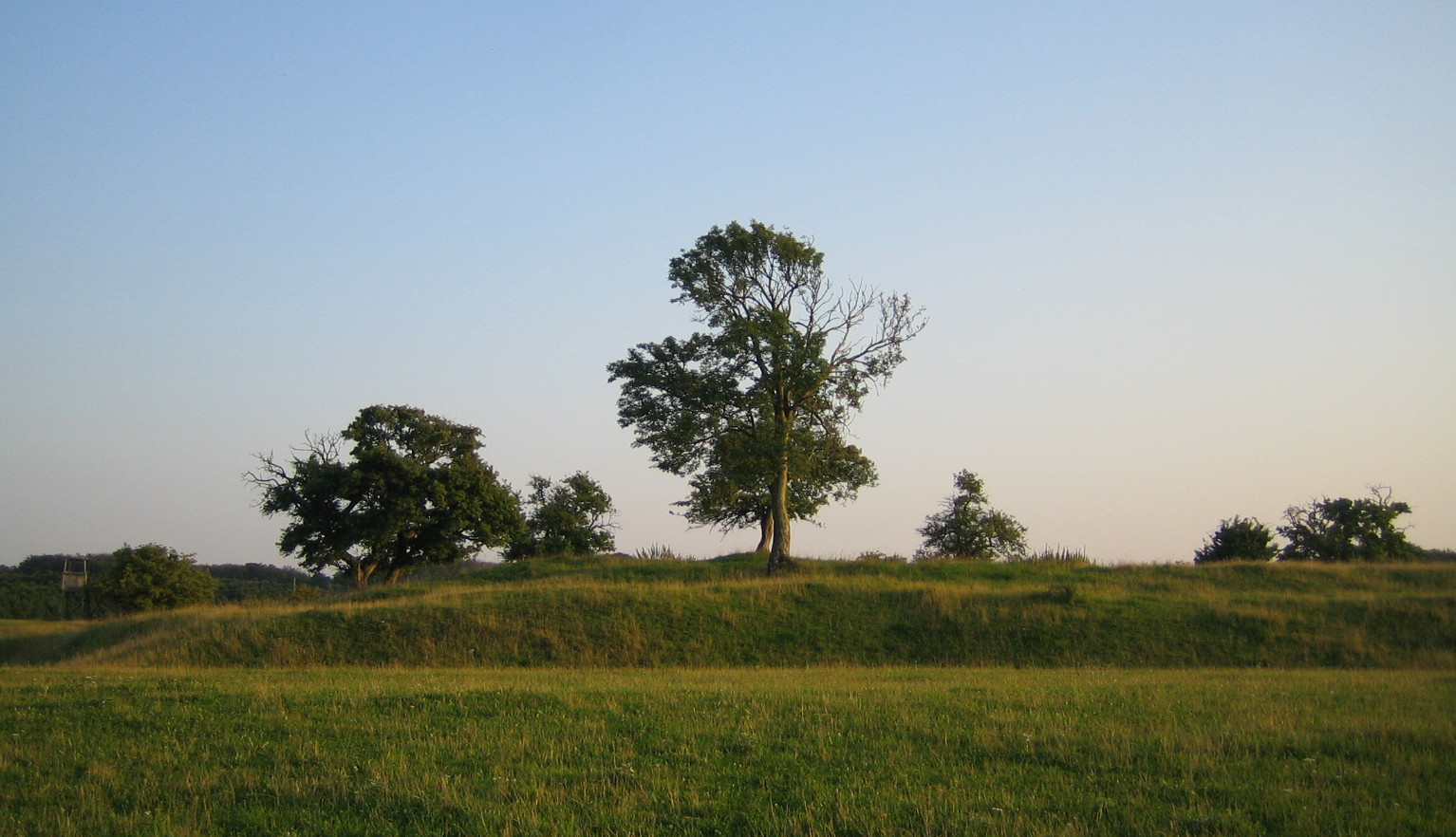
Lindholmen Castle

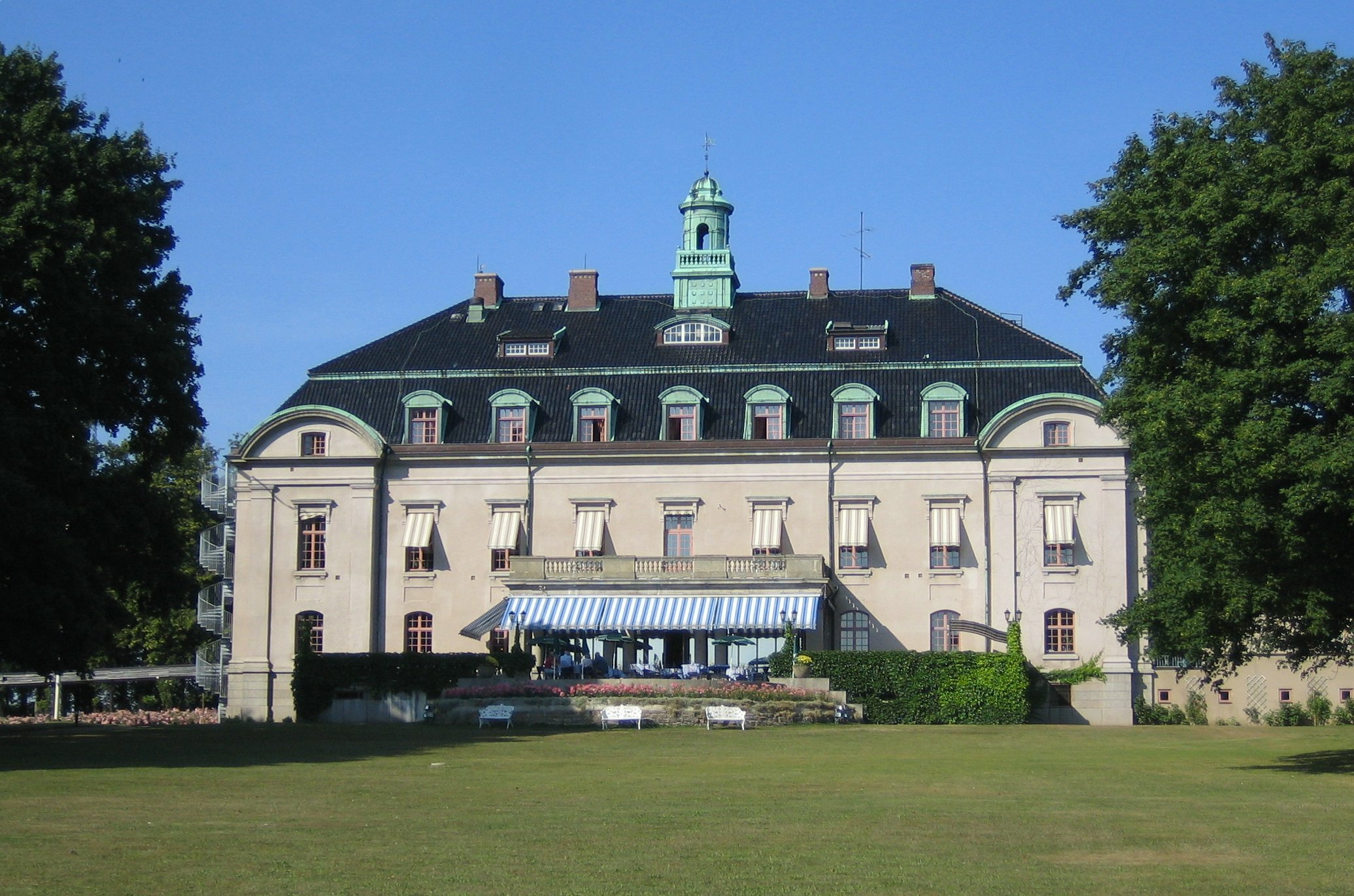
Örenäs Castle

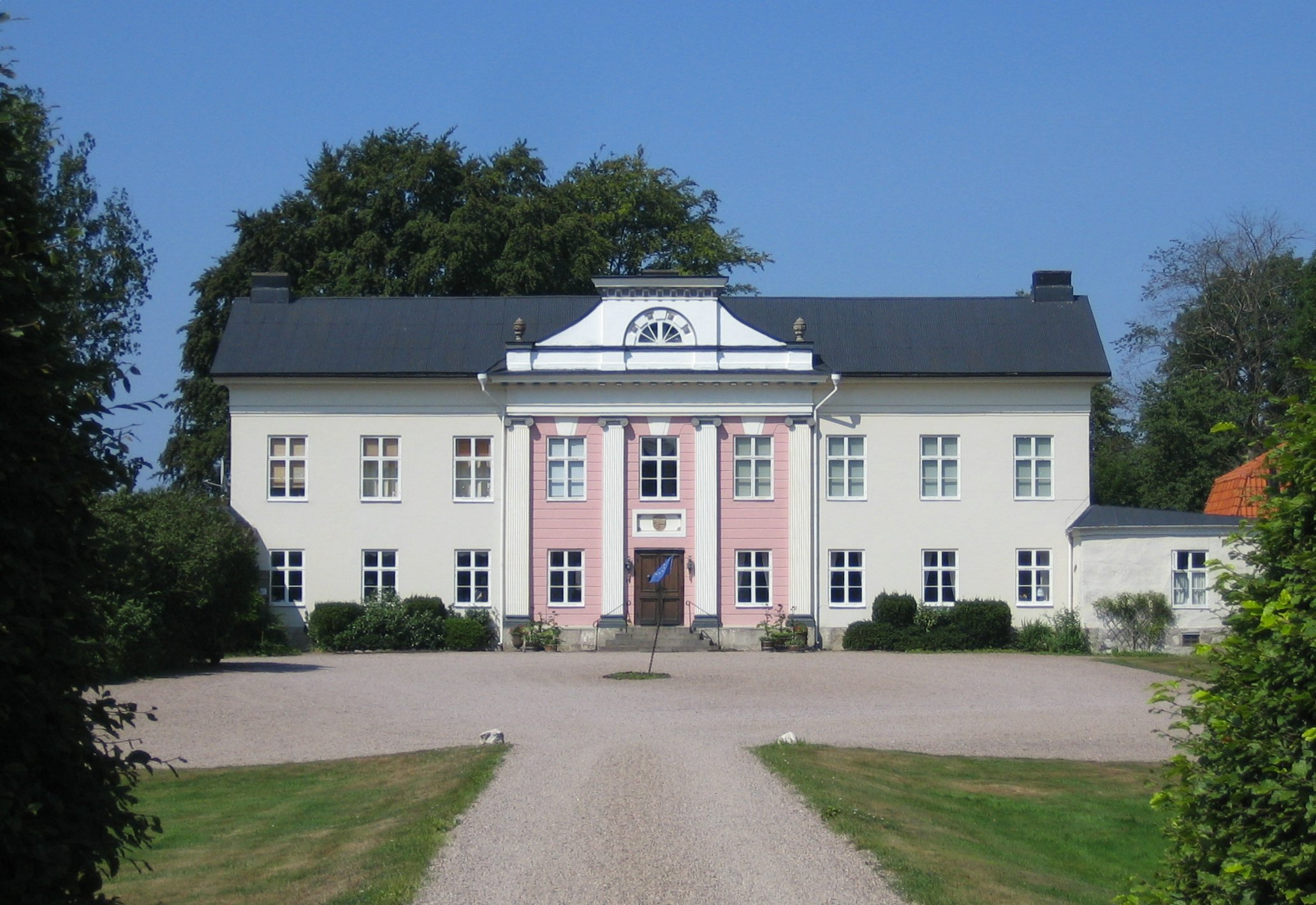
Össjö Castle

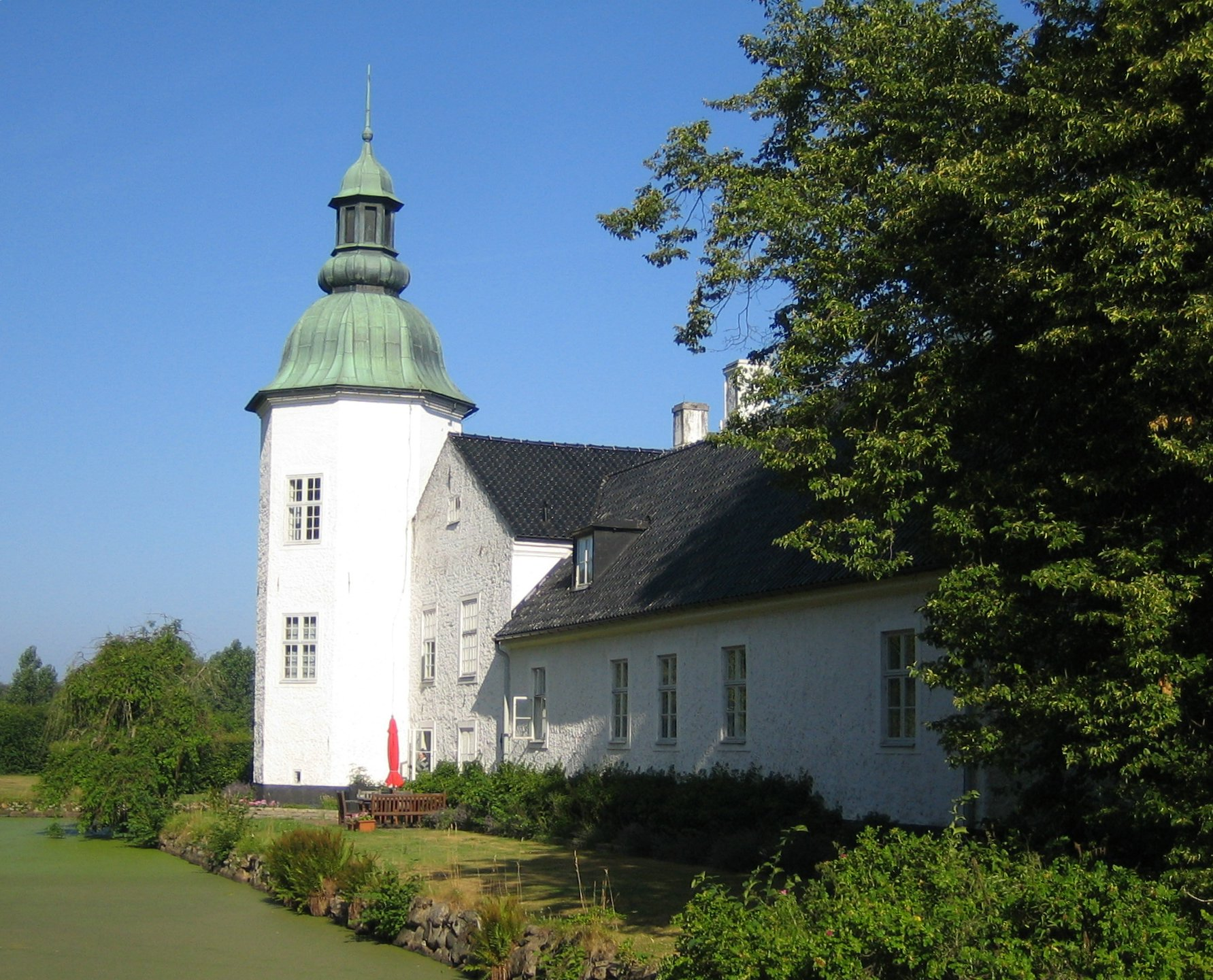
Osbyholm Castle

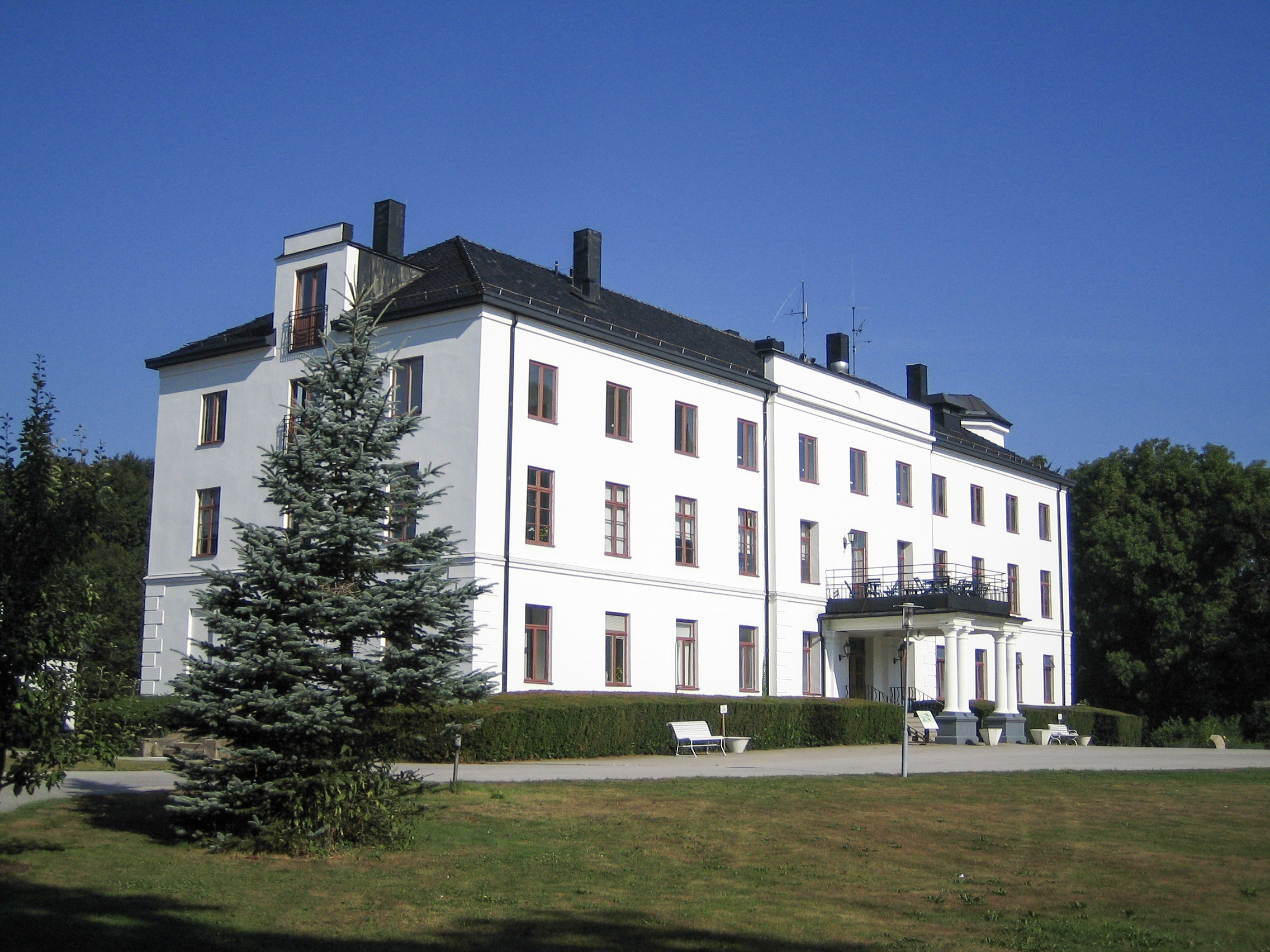
Rönneholm Castle

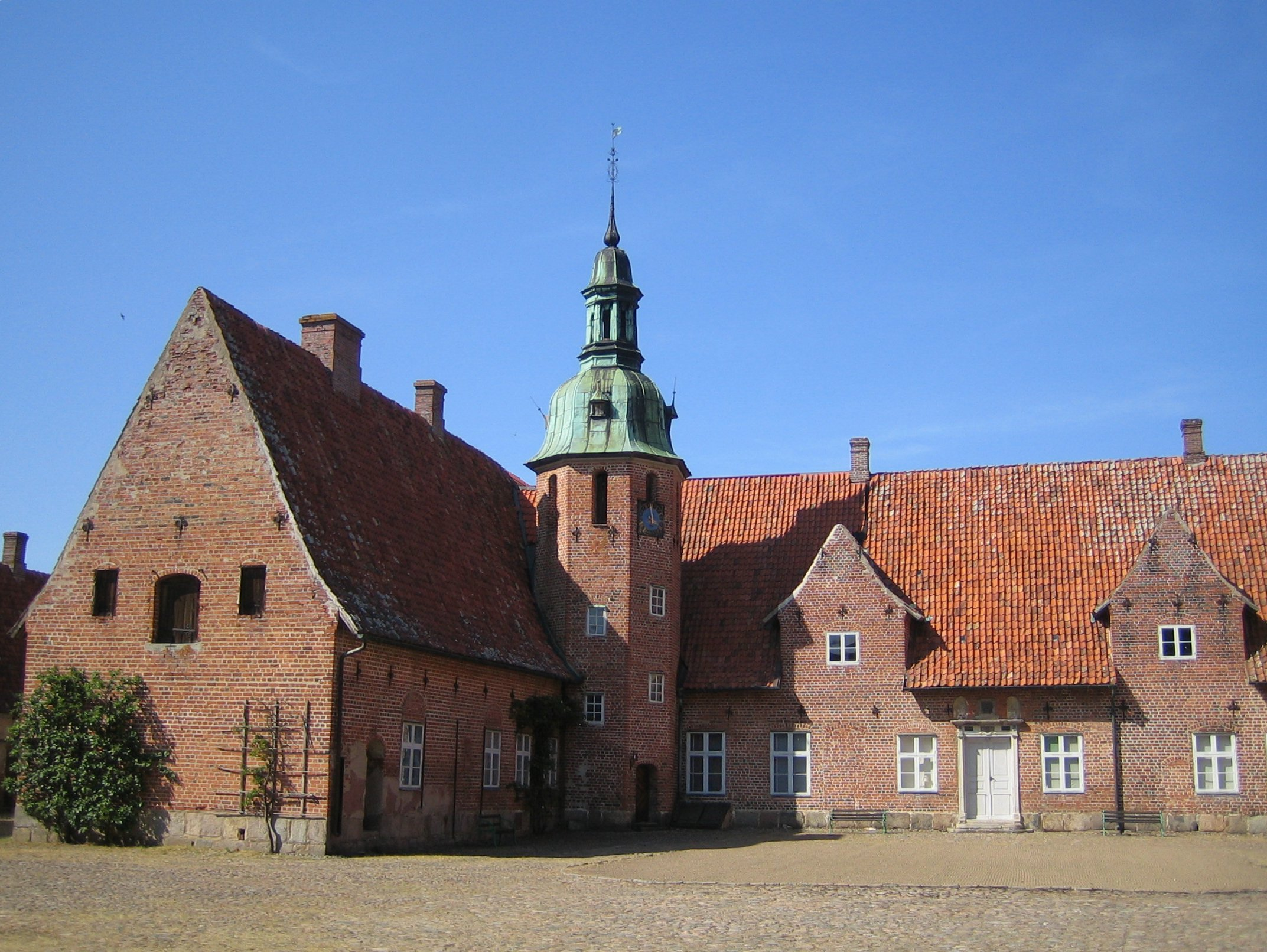
Rosendal Castle, Helsingborg

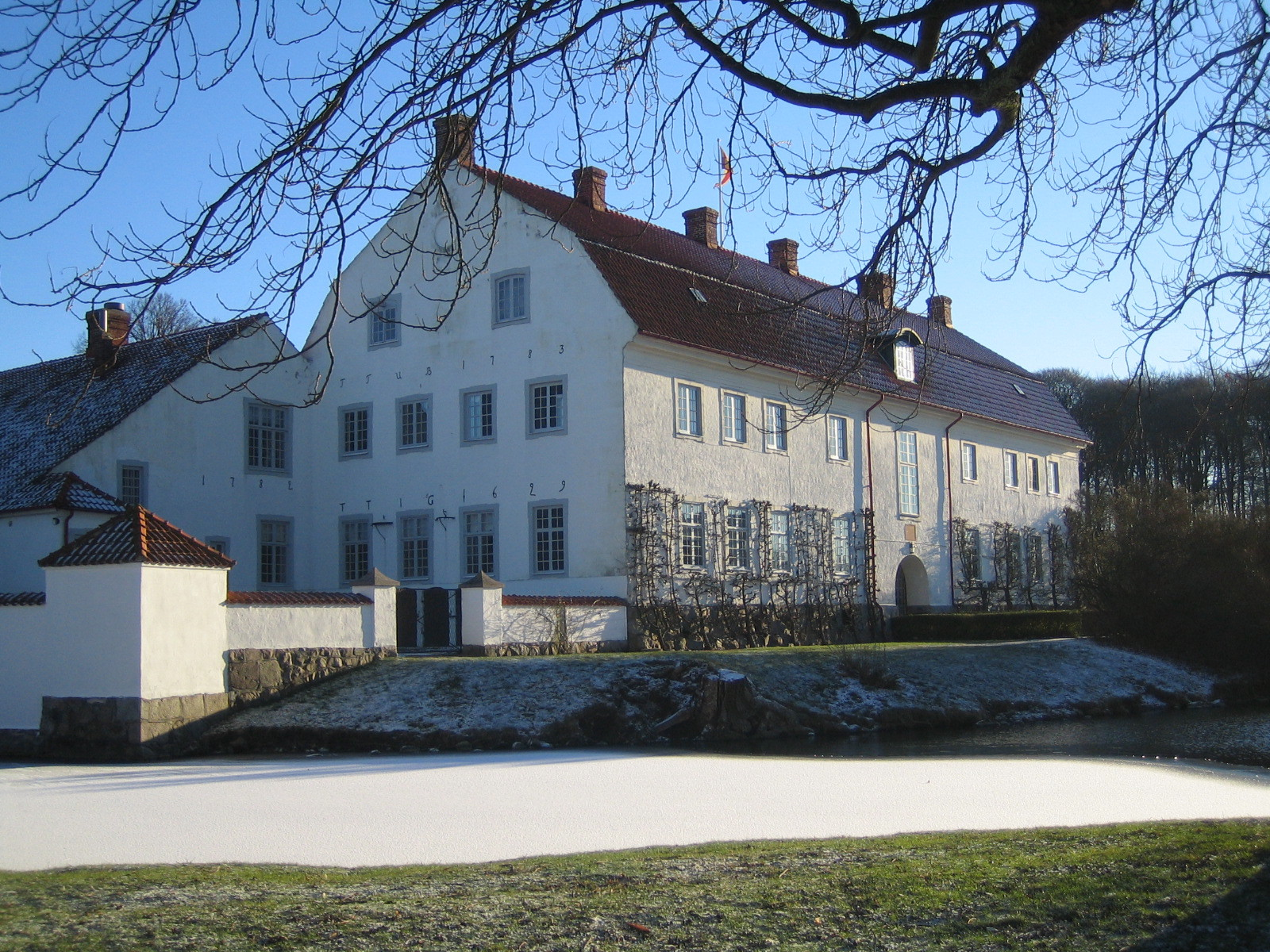
Skabersjö Castle

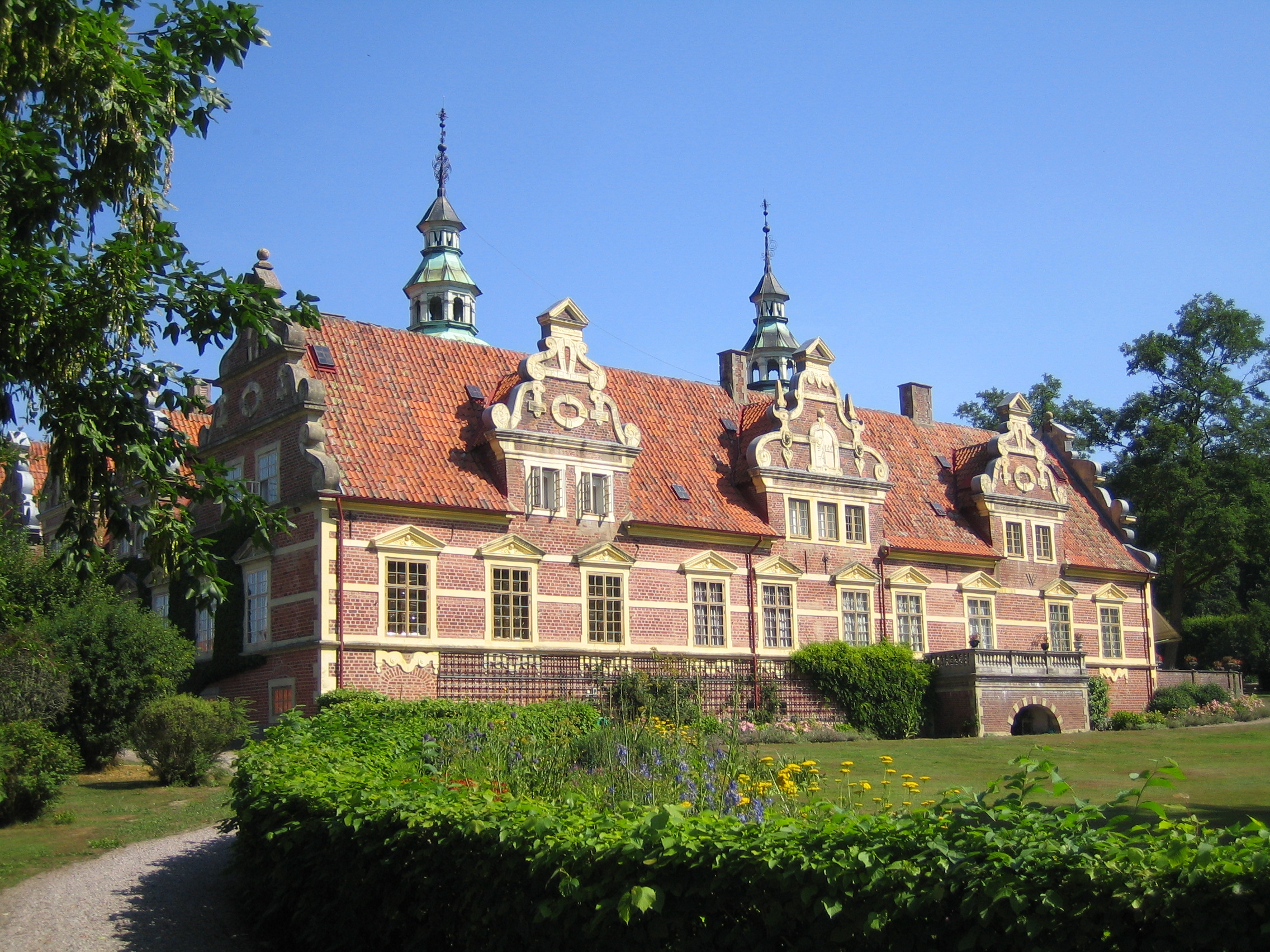
Vrams Gunnarstorp Castle

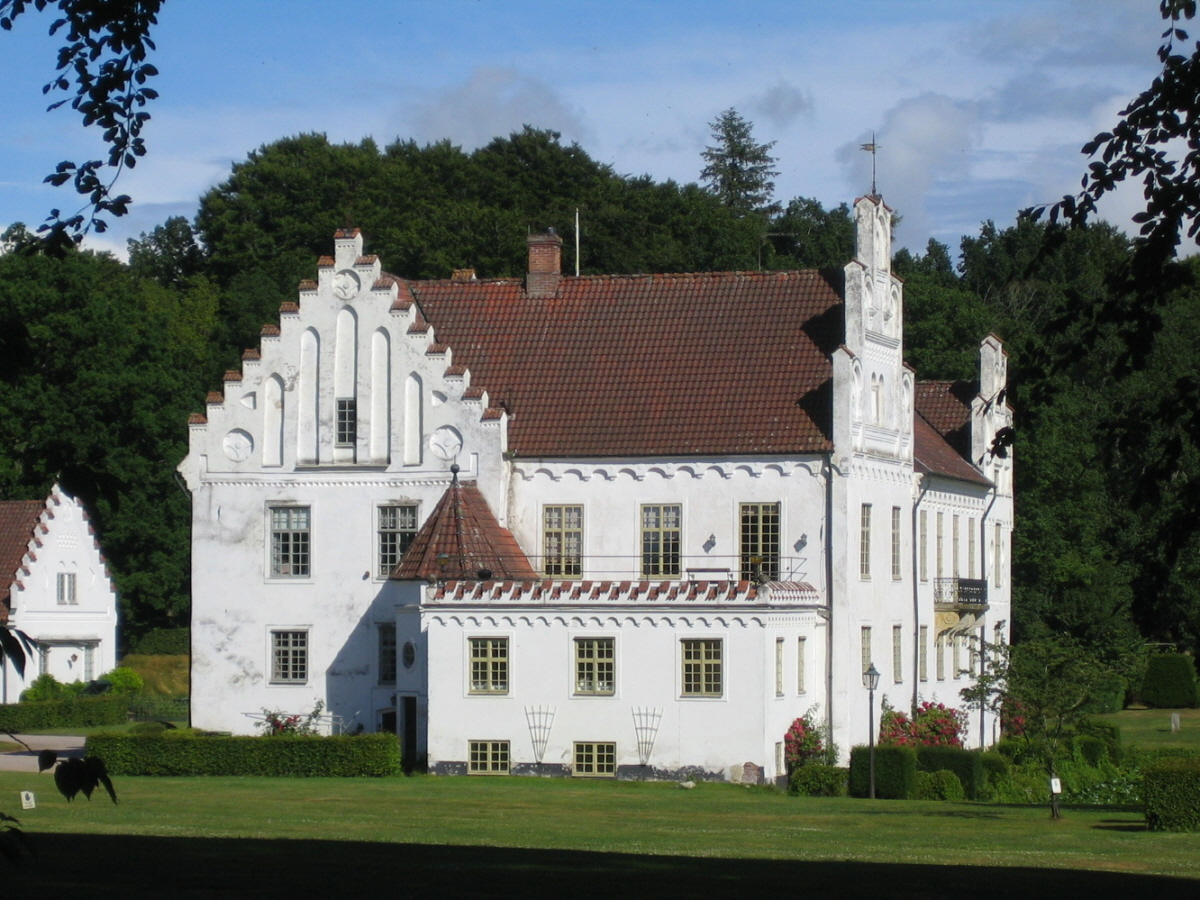
Wanås Castle
