= Dybäck Castle =

Castle in Scania, Sweden

- Dybäcks slott
- Skurup Municipality
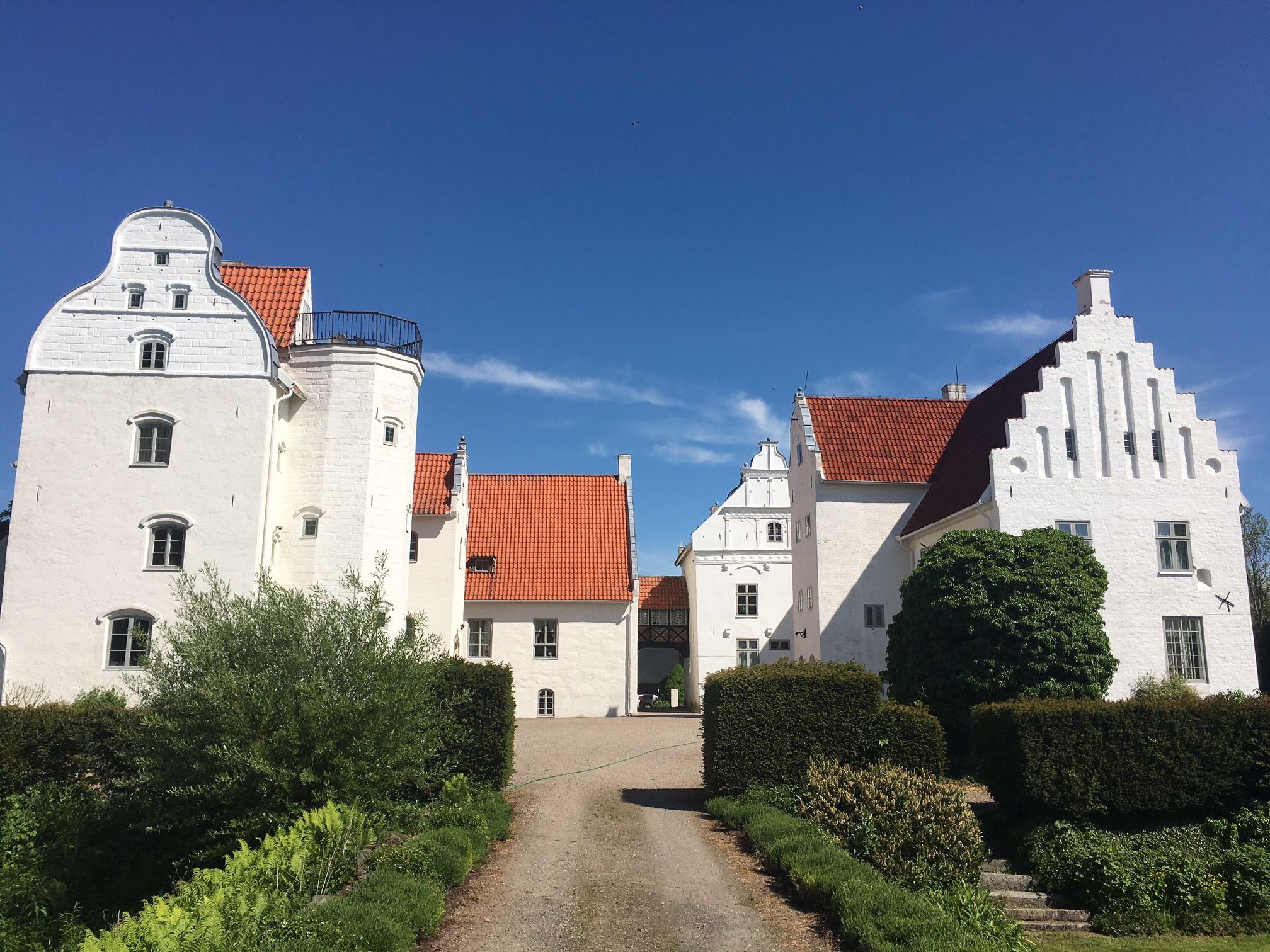
- Dybäck

Site information
- Type: Castle
- Open to the public: No

Location
- Scania, Sweden
- Location within Skåne
- Coordinates: 55.4012°N 13.5250°E

Site history
- Built: 1500-1700

Dybäck Castle (Swedish: Dybäcks slott) is a manor at Skurup Municipality in Scania, Sweden. The estate was known from the 14th century. The manor is actually a complex of several buildings. The oldest part of the manor was built in the late 15th century. Additions were made in the middle of the 16th century. The western parts with the stair tower were built in the 17th century.

It combines Gothic, Renaissance and Baroque styles.

== See also ==
- List of castles in Sweden
