= Pålsjö Castle =

Manor in Scania, Sweden

- Pålsjö slott
- Helsingborg Municipality
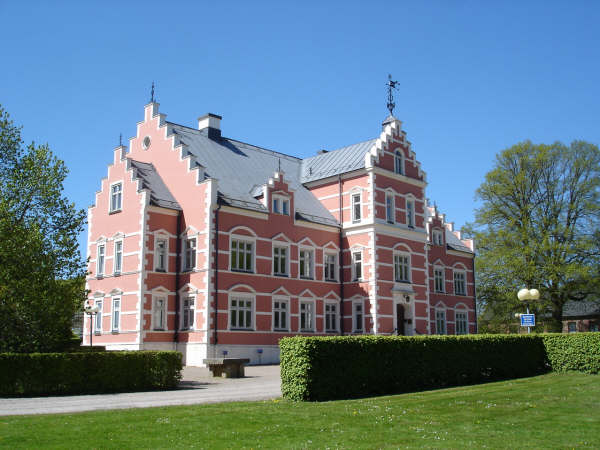
- Pålsjö Castle

Site information
- Open to the public: Unknown

Location
- Scania, Sweden
- Coordinates: 56.068889°N 12.68°E

Site history
- Built: 1676-1679; 347 years ago

Pålsjö Castle (Swedish: Pålsjö slott) is a manor from the 17th century at Helsingborg Municipality in Scania, Sweden.

== History ==
The first owner of record was Danish noble Steen Basse Bille (ca 1446–1520). Following the Treaty of Roskilde in 1658, Scania became a possession of the Swedish Crown. The current building was built in the period 1676-79 following the Scanian War (1676–1679) during which the estate was largely destroyed while the Danish army in Scania was defeated by the Swedish army. During the Battle of Helsingborg in 1710, Swedish field marshal Magnus Stenbock (1665–1717) had his headquarters at Pålsjö.

The French-style park was founded in the 1760s. During 1869–1873, the manor was reconstructed in Neo-Renaissance style. The city of Helsingborg bought the estate Pålsjö in 1908 and acquired the manor building with the surrounding park in 1957.

== See also ==
- List of castles in Sweden
