= Örtofta Castle =

Castle in Scania, Sweden

- Örtofta slott
- Eslöv Municipality
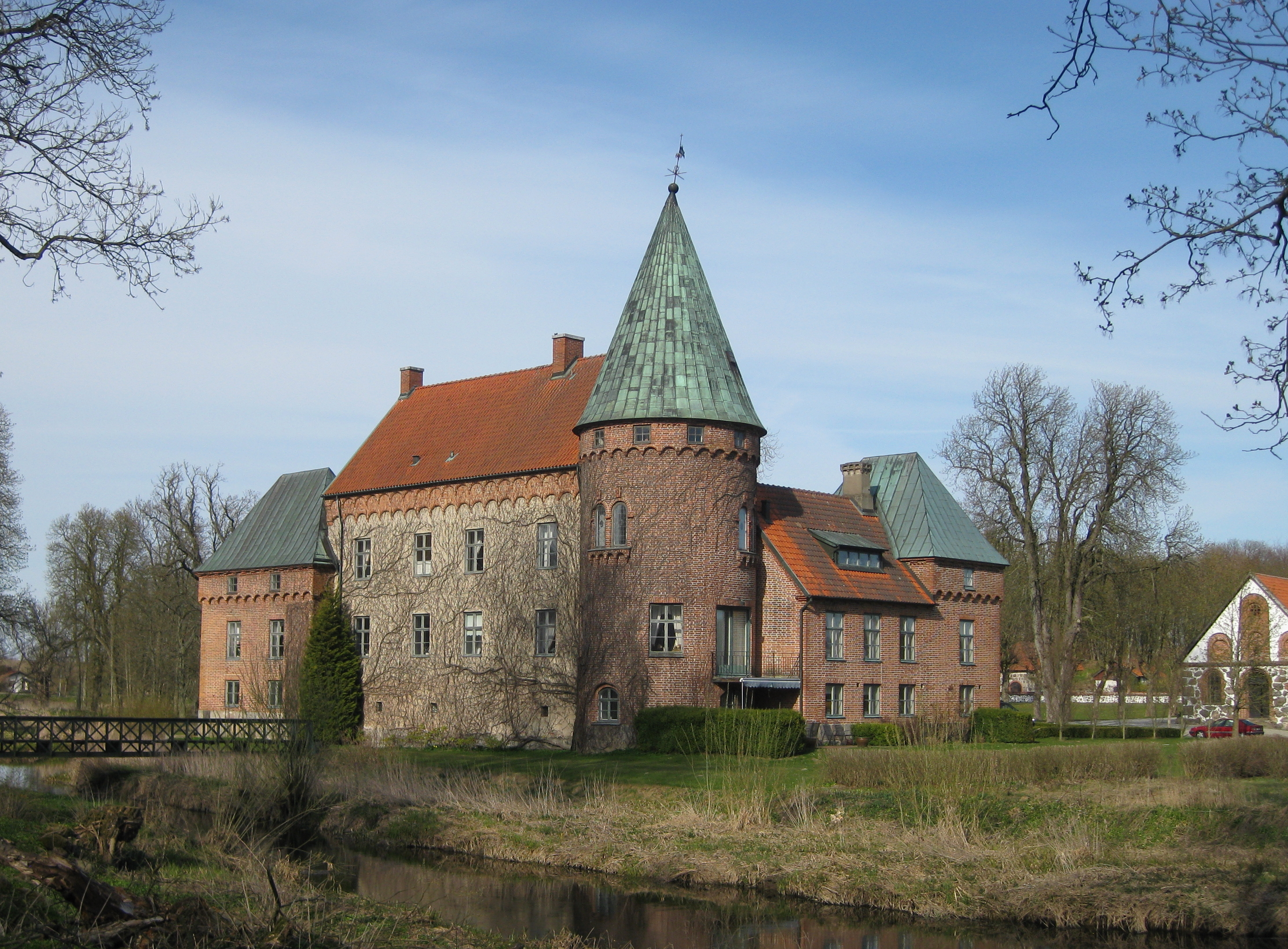
- Örtofta Castle

Site information
- Type: Castle
- Open to the public: No

Location
- Scania, Sweden
- Location within Skåne
- Coordinates: 55.7844°N 13.2453°E

Site history
- Built: 15th century

Örtofta Castle (Swedish: Örtofta slott) is a castle in Eslöv Municipality in Scania, Sweden.

== History ==
At the end of the 15th century, a castle-like main building was built, the remains of which are still part of the old part of the current structure. It was probably Tönne Vernersen Parsberg, who died in 1521, had the permanent structure built, of which remains are still included in the old part of the current castle. Through inheritance, Örtofta came to belong to members of several noble families including members of the Barnekow family. Renovation were made to the estate and surrounding the baroque park. During the 1860s, the castle and its outbuildings took on their current form.

== See also ==
- List of castles in Sweden
