= Karsholm Castle =

Building in Kristianstad Municipality, Skåne County, Sweden

- Karsholms slott
- Kristianstad Municipality
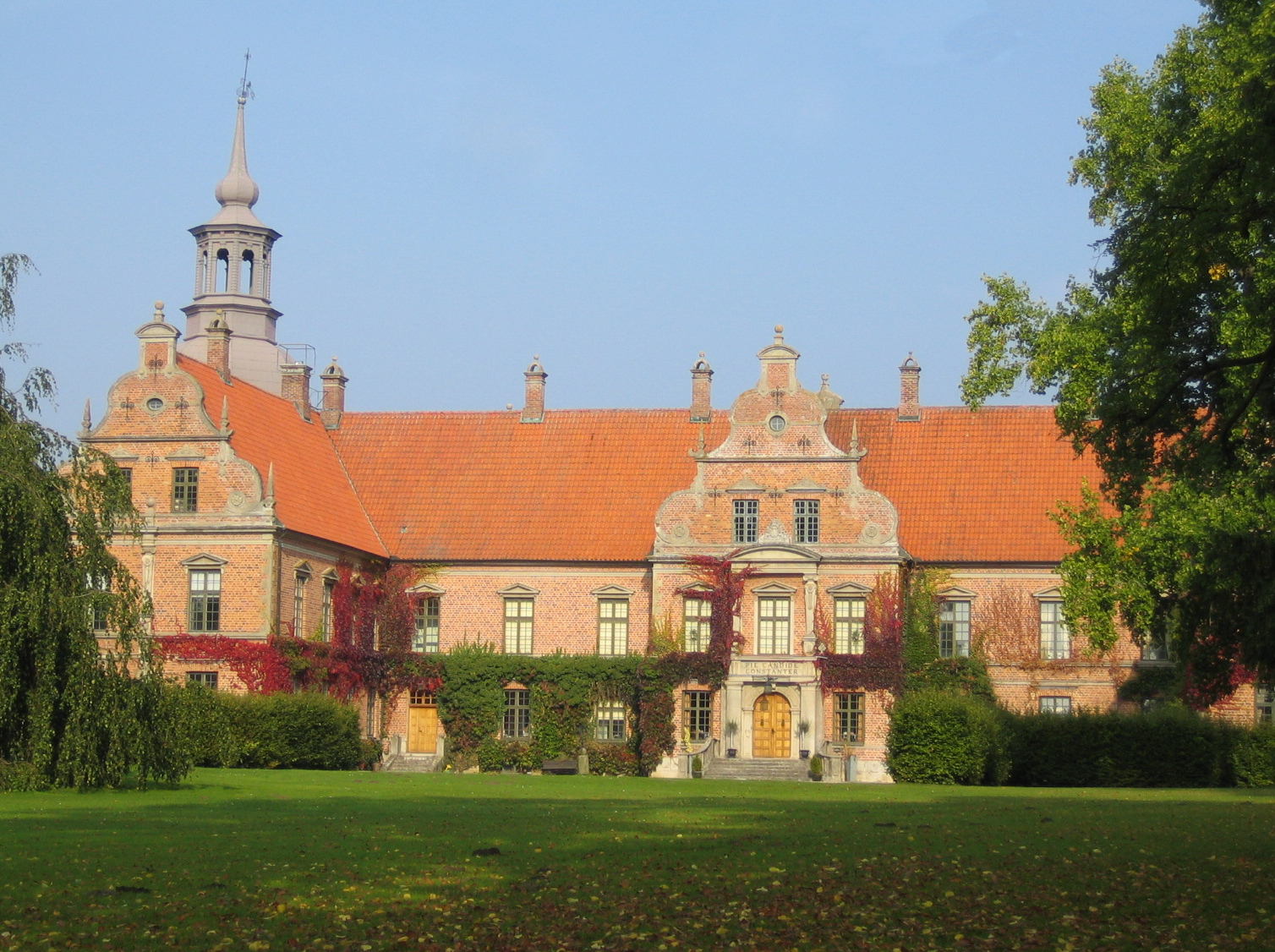
- Karsholm Castle

Site information
- Open to the public: No

Location
- Scania, Sweden
- Coordinates: 56.115833°N 14.3075°E

Site history
- Built: 1627

Karsholm Castle (Swedish: Karsholms slott) is an estate at Kristianstad Municipality in Scania Sweden.

== History ==
Karsholm was first mentioned in the 14th century. A four-length facility was completed around 1620. It passed over the centuries to various owners. In 1781 Karsholm was bought by Swedish count Fredrik Ulrik von Rosen (1731-1793). The main house underwent extensive renovation by Rudolf Hodder Stjernswärd, after he bought Karsholm in 1854. The current appearance was given to the main house in 1862, when it was rebuilt as a Dutch New Renaissance manor house under the direction of Danish architect Johan Christian Ferdinand Zwingmann (1827-1891).

Karsholm (Karsholms Gods) has been owned and operated since 1869 by members of the Treschow family.

== See also ==
- List of castles in Sweden
