= Lillö Ruin =

Ruin of a medieval castle in Scania, Sweden

- Lillö Borgruin
- Kristianstad Municipality
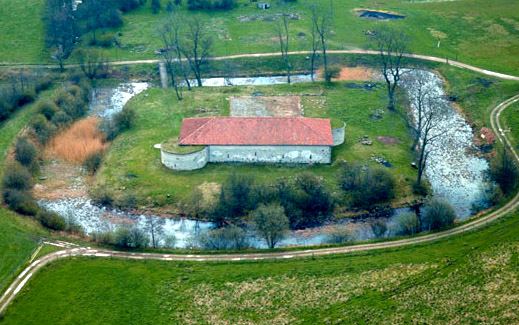
- Lillö Ruin

Site information
- Type: Ruin
- Open to the public: Yes

Location
- Scania, Sweden
- Coordinates: 56.035942°N 14.119640°E

Site history
- Demolished: 1658

Lillö Ruin is the ruin of a medieval castle, located in Kristianstad municipality, Scania, Sweden.

Not much is known of the earliest history of Lillö ("Little island"). A fortress was built there, probably as early as the late 13th century. The fortress was gradually improved to become more of a castle, Lillöhus. In the war of 1657 - 1658 Denmark lost the province of Scania to Sweden and Lillöhus was demolished. It has remained a ruin ever since. The fields and wetlands surrounding the ruin are rich in bird life.
