= Vannaröd Castle =

Building in Hässleholm Municipality, Skåne County, Sweden

- Vannaröds slott
- Hässleholm Municipality
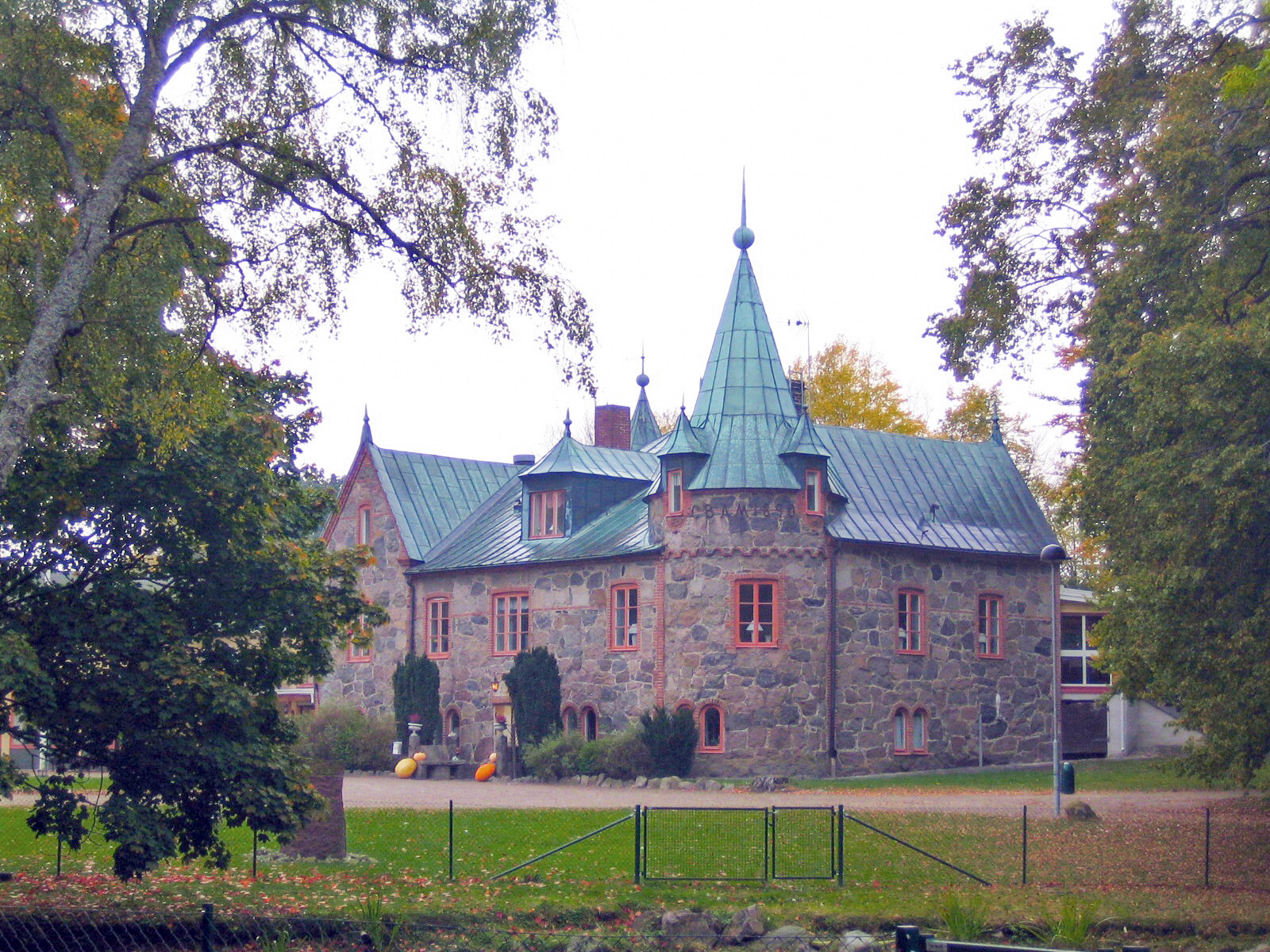
- Vannaröd Castle

Site information
- Type: Manor House
- Open to the public: Yes

Location
- Scania, Sweden
- Location within Skåne
- Coordinates: 56.0436°N 13.6739°E

Site history
- Built: 1890

Vannaröd Castle (Swedish: Vannaröds slott) is an estate at Hässleholm Municipality in Scania, Sweden. The manor house was built in Tudor style during 1890 by Gustaf Christian Edvard Barnekow (1837–1916) and his wife Agnes Sofia Montgomery (1848–1936). Barnekow had it built as a copy of his wife's ancestral home in Scotland. Vannaröd has been owned by Sösdalaortens Bygdegårdsföreningen since 1953. The main building is currently leased out to a restaurant operation.

== See also ==
- List of castles in Sweden
