= Bellinga Castle =

Castle in Ystad Municipality, Scania, Sweden

- Bellinga slott
- Ystad Municipality
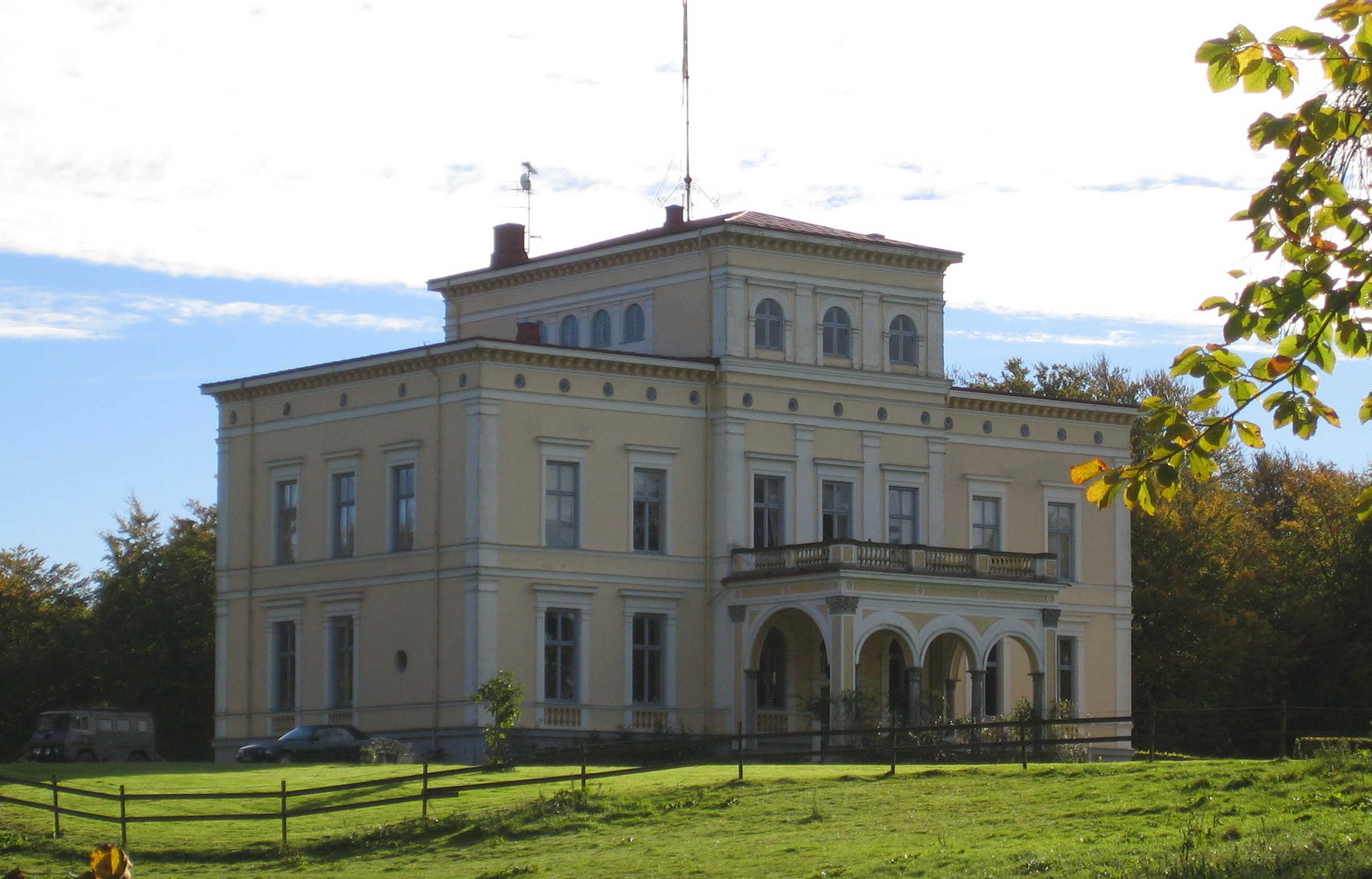
- Bellinga Castle

Site information
- Type: Manor House
- Open to the public: No

Location
- Scania Sweden
- Coordinates: 55.528056°N 13.716944°E

Site history
- Built: 1860s

Bellinga Castle (Swedish: Bellinga slott) is situated in Ystad Municipality, Scania, Sweden. The mansion was built in Italian Renaissance style in the 1860s, by Amelie Elisabet Charlotta Piper (1836–1921) and her husband Member of Parliament and Foreign Minister, Carl Fredrik Hochschild (1831-1898).

== See also ==
- List of castles in Sweden
