= Löberöd Castle =

Estate and manor house in Scania, Sweden

- Löberöds slott
- Eslöv Municipality
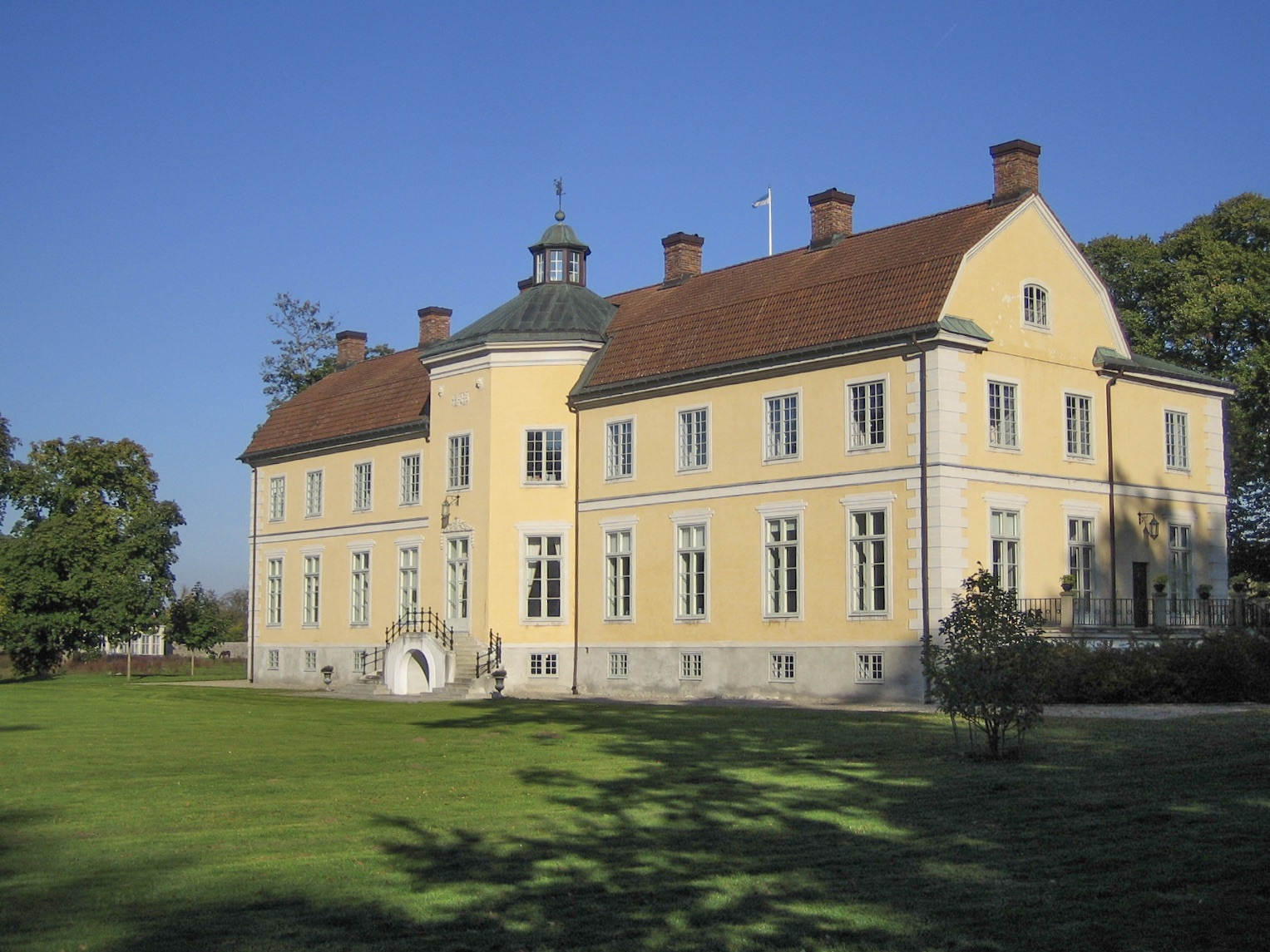
- Löberöd Castle

Site information
- Type: Castle
- Open to the public: Sometimes

Location
- Scania, Sweden
- Coordinates: 55.7728°N 13.4825°E

Site history
- Built: 17th century

Löberöd Castle (Swedish: Löberöds slott) is an estate and manor house at Eslöv Municipality in Scania, Sweden.

== History ==
The main building was built in 1798–1799 by Baron Hans Ramel (1724–1799). After Ramel's death his daughter, Countess Amalia Sparre (1753–1830), sold the estate to her daughter Christina Sparre af Söfdeborg and her husband Lieutenant General and diplomat Jacob De la Gardie (1768–1842).

== See also ==
- List of castles in Sweden
