= Ovesholm Castle =

Manor house in Scania, Sweden

- Ovesholms slott
- Kristianstad Municipality
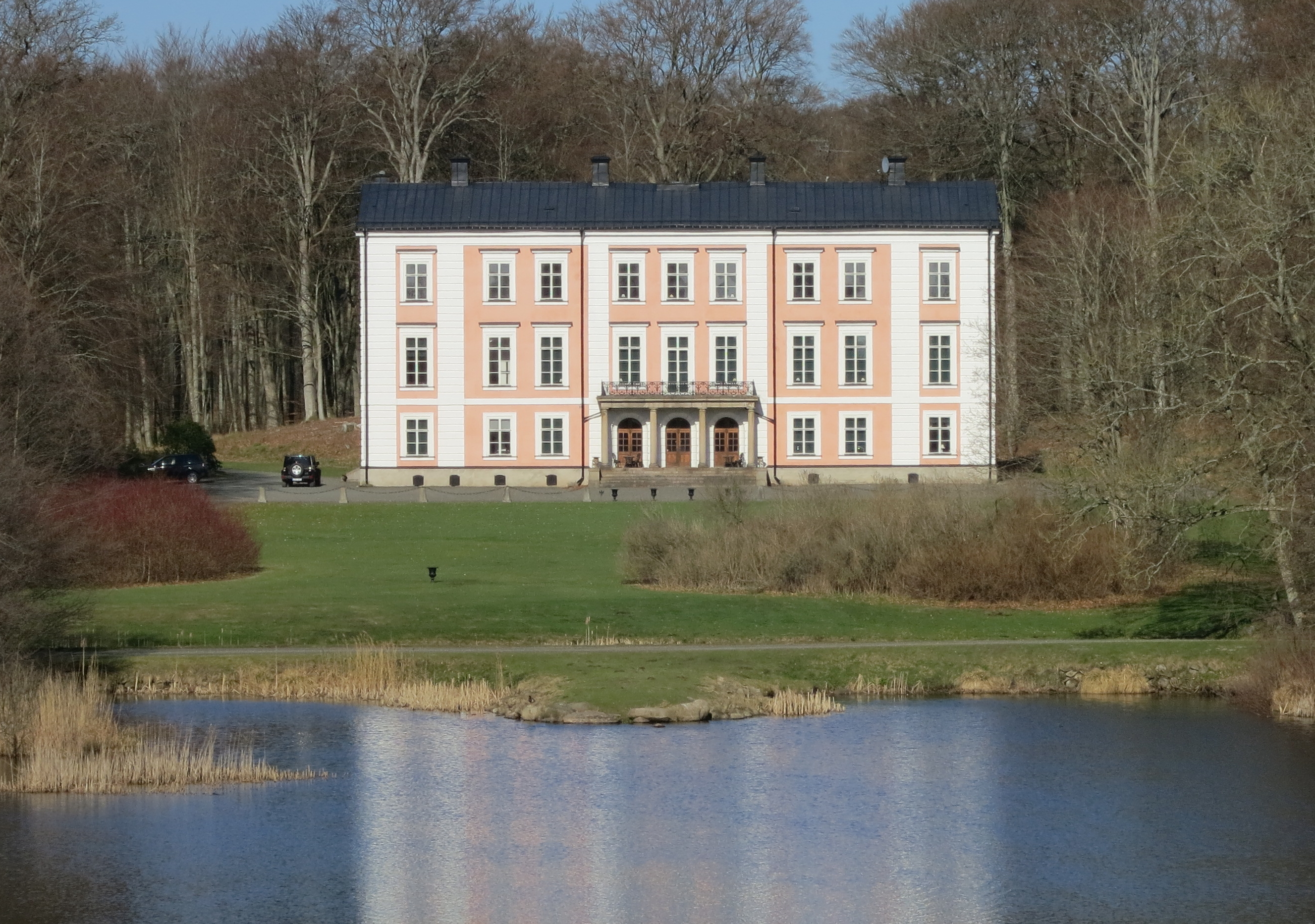
- Ovesholm Castle

Site information
- Open to the public: No

Location
- Scania, Sweden
- Location within Skåne
- Coordinates: 56.000485°N 14.001742°E

Site history
- Built: 17th century

Ovesholm Castle (Swedish: Ovesholm slott) is a manor house at Kristianstad Municipality in Scania, Sweden.

Carl Adam Wrangel (1748–1829), governor of Kristianstad, had the manor house built in 1792–1804. Count Axel Raoul Hamilton (1787–1875) had an extension built in 1857.

== See also ==
- List of castles in Sweden
