= Råbelöv Castle =

Manor house in Kristianstad Municipality, Scania, Sweden

- Råbelövs slott
- Kristianstad Municipality
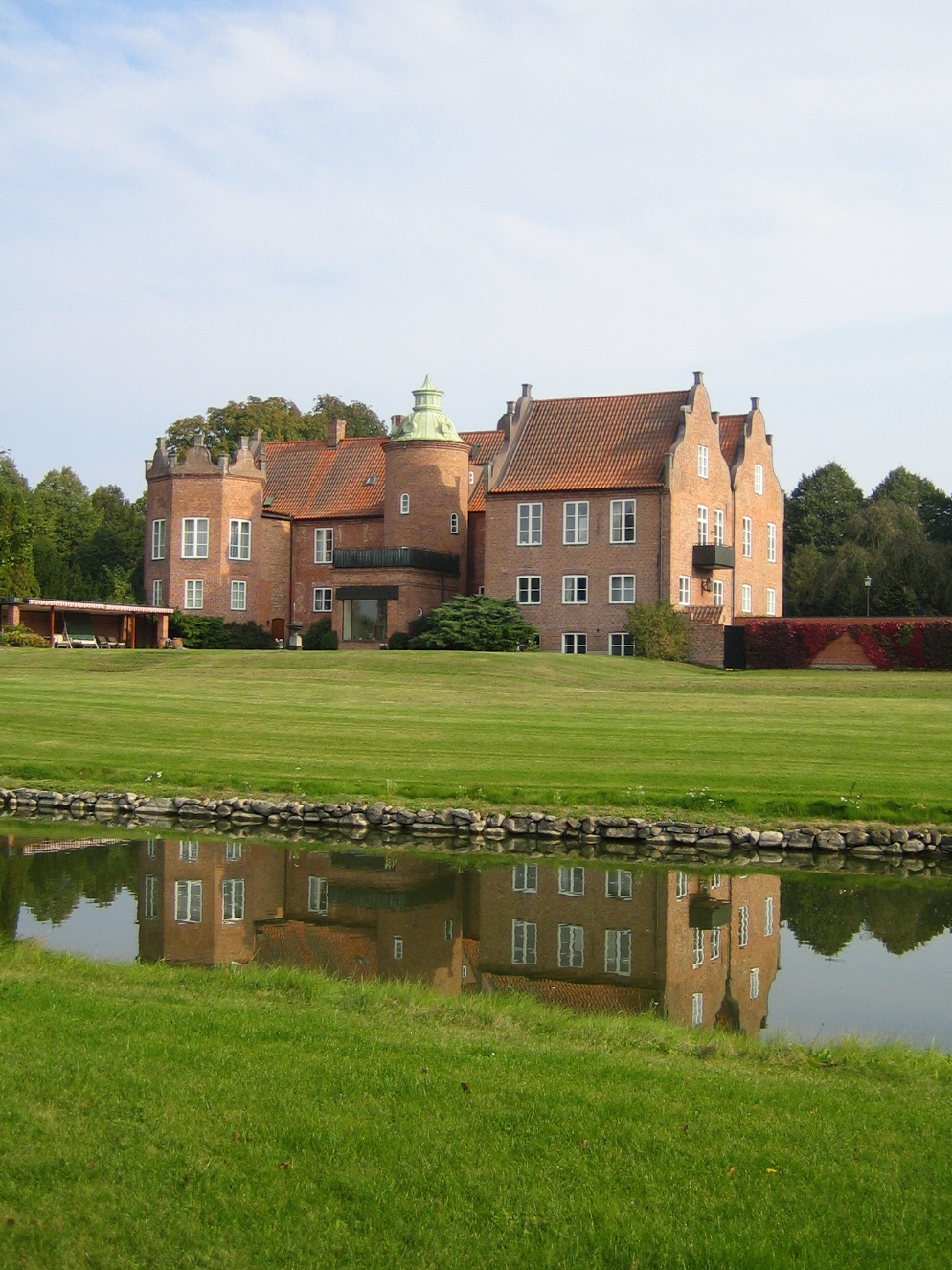
- Råbelöv

Site information
- Type: manor house
- Owner: Johan Murray
- Open to the public: No

Location
- Scania, Sweden
- Coordinates: 56.079167°N 14.190556°E

Site history
- Built: after 1782
- Materials: Stone

Råbelöv Castle (Swedish: Råbelövs slott) is a manor house in Kristianstad Municipality in Scania, Sweden.

== History ==
The estate was named after the village Råby, where rå stands for a troll, and by stands for a village; löv is an ornamental addition meaning a leaf. Danish councilor and war commissioner in Scania Christoffer Ulfeldt (1583–1653) had the main building built in 1637. The estate passed to his son Ebbe Christoffersen Ulfeldt (1616–1682) in 1663. After Ulfeldt's death in 1682, Råbelöv passed to his brother-in-law, Swedish military officer Carl Gustaf Skytte (1647–1717). In 1782, the estate burned down and the main building was severely damaged. Completely new buildings were subsequently built.

== See also ==
- List of castles in Sweden
