= Örenäs Castle =

Stately mansion in Scania, Sweden

- Örenäs slott
- Ålabodsvägen 193; Landskrona Municipality
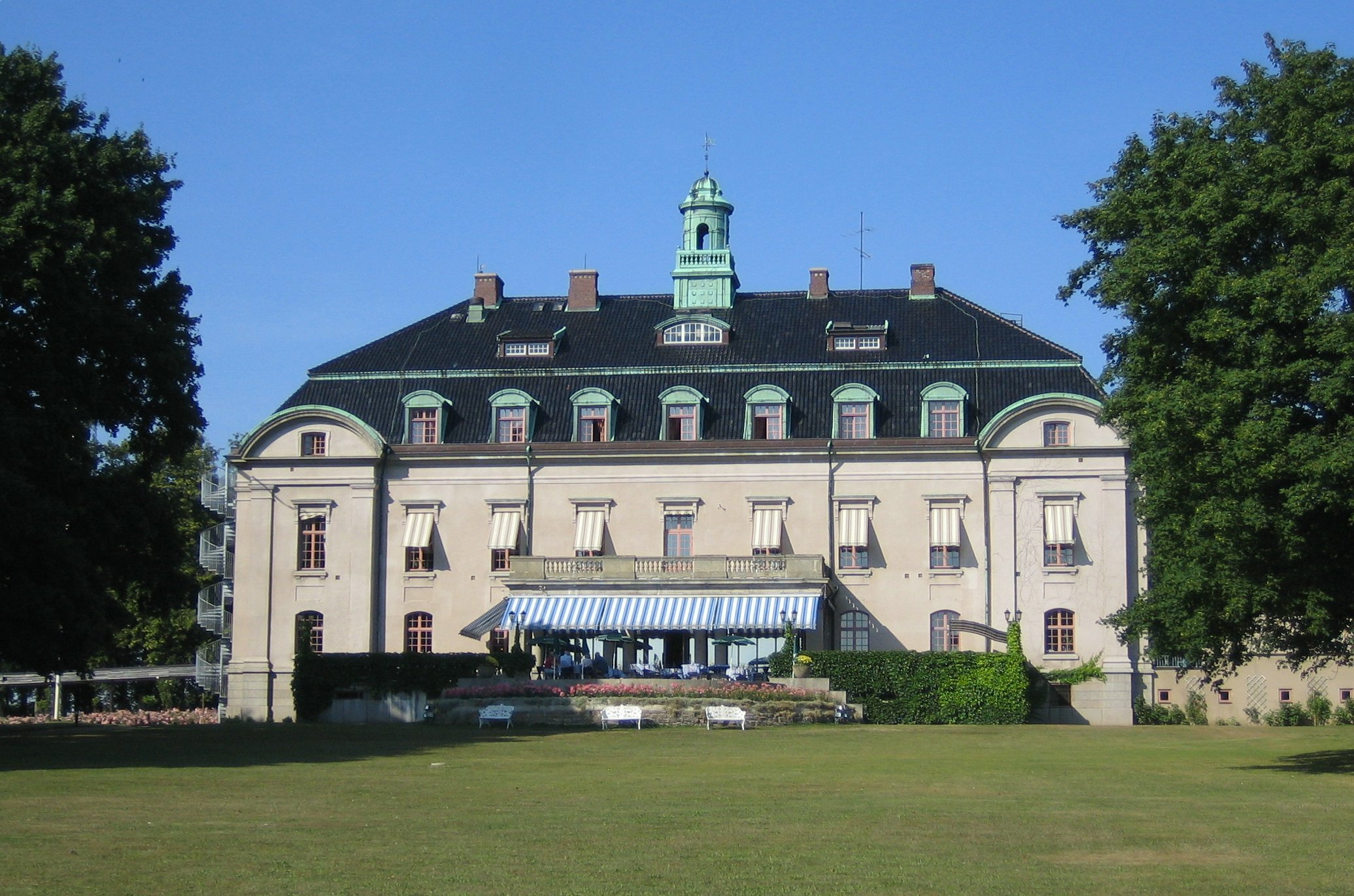
- Örenäs Castle

Site information
- Open to the public: Yes

Location
- Scania, Sweden
- Coordinates: 55.9403°N 12.7808°E

Site history
- Built: 1914-18

Örenäs Castle (Swedish: Örenäs slott) is a stately mansion at Landskrona Municipality in Scania, Sweden. It is situated approximately 8 kilometres (5.0 mi) from the center of Landskrona.

== History ==
The building as it looks today was built in 1914–1918, when Swedish engineer and industrialist Carl Tranchell (1849-1919) had it constructed. It was designed to resemble a Baroque style castle by architect Fredrik Sundbärg (1860-1913). During World War II, Danish and Estonian refugees were hosted here. In 1970, the building was renovated and became a public facility. It and surrounding buildings are now a hotel (with 115 rooms) and conference centre with a public restaurant.

== See also ==
- List of castles in Sweden
