= Rönneholm Castle =

Estate in Eslöv Municipality, Scania, Sweden

- Rönneholms slott
- Eslöv Municipality
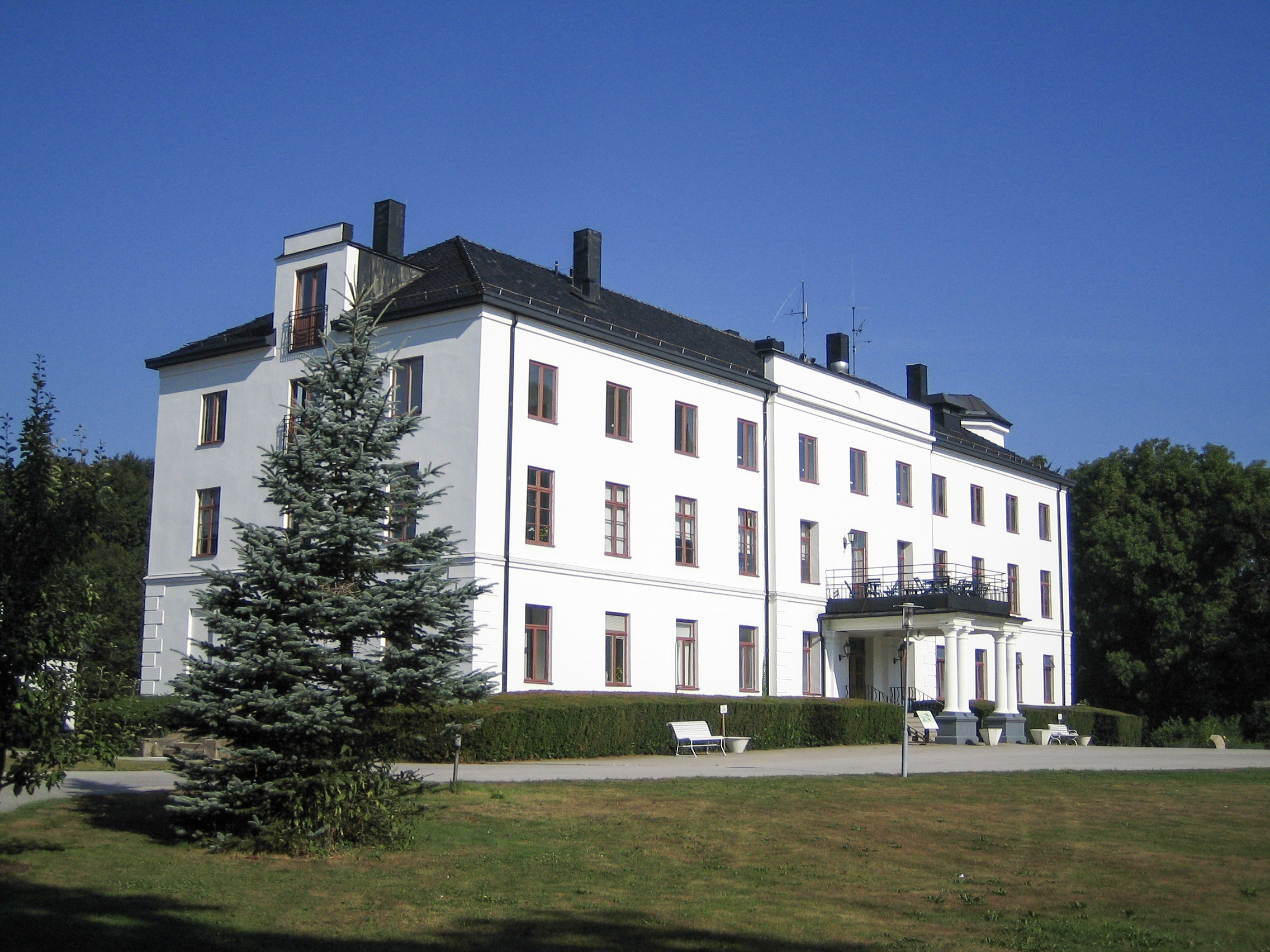
- Rönneholm Castle

Site information
- Type: Castle
- Open to the public: Yes

Location
- Scania, Sweden
- Coordinates: 55.934444°N 13.389722°E

Site history
- Built: 1811

Rönneholm Castle (Swedish: Rönneholms slott) is located in Eslöv Municipality, Scania, Sweden.

The history of the estate dates back to the early Middle Ages. The original construction period is unknown. It was rebuilt in 1811 in the French Renaissance style and remodeled in 1882 with the addition of a third floor. In 1941 the building was ravaged by a fire but was restored. For much of the 20th century, the castle served as a sanatorium.

== See also ==
- List of castles in Sweden
