= Skåneleden =

Hiking trail in Sweden

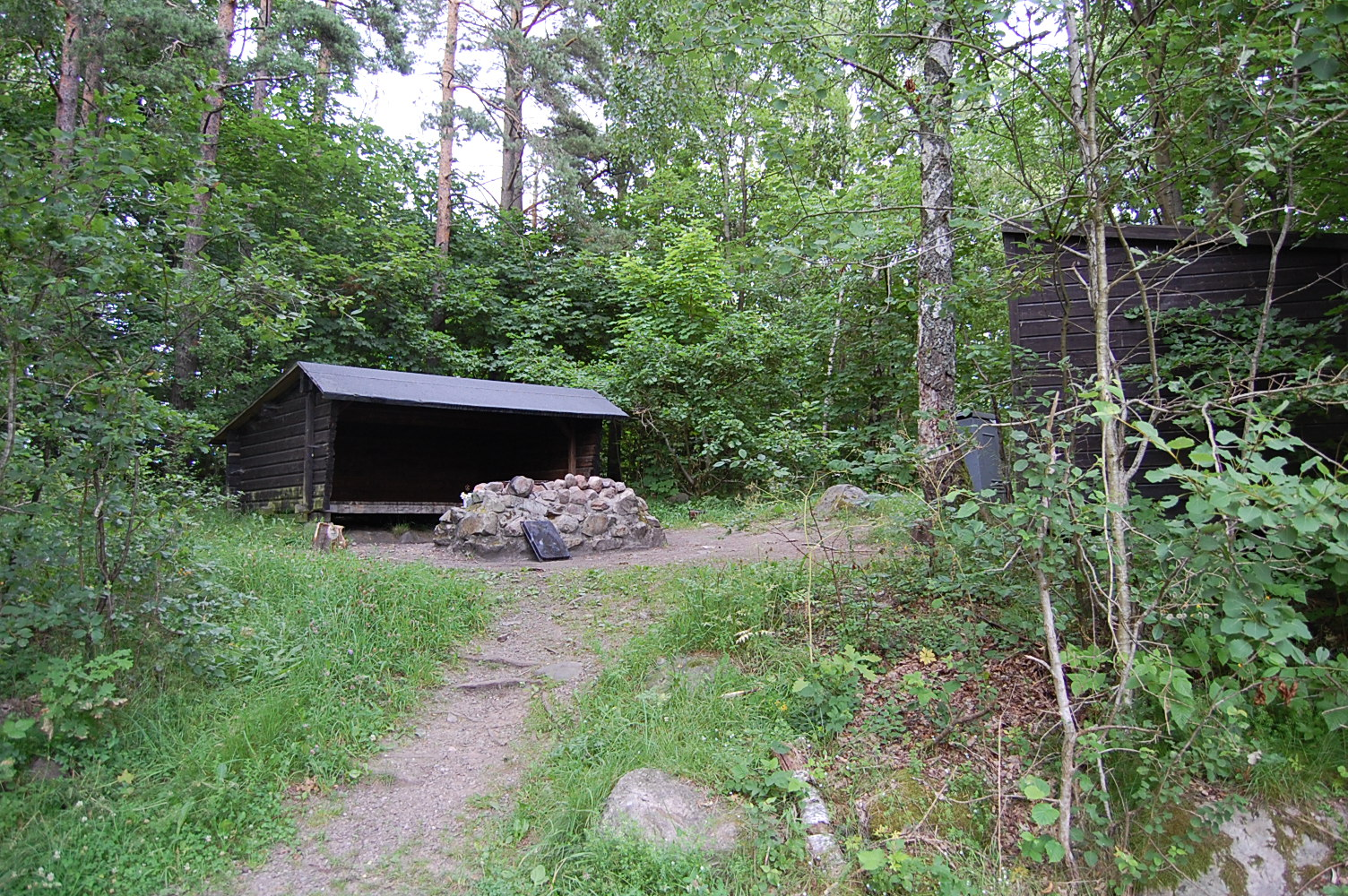
- Shelter along the trail, lake Grundsjön
- Length: 1,600 km (990 mi)
- Location: Skåne, Sweden
- Established: 1978
- Use: Hiking
- Difficulty: Varied
- Waymark: Orange square
- Sights: Dalby Söderskog, Hovdala Castle, Kullaberg, Sofiero Palace, Söderåsen, Stenshuvud, Vattenriket
- Maintainer: Municipalities of Skåne County
- Website: skaneleden.se

The Skåneleden trail is a long-distance walking trail that stretches all over the countryside of Skåne, in southern Sweden. The trail spans around 1,600 kilometres (990 mi) and is divided into seven sub-trails, with a total of 148 sections. The trail can easily be recognized by the orange trail marks along the footpath. The trail runs from the west to east and from north to south and passes through a highly diversified landscape such as rocky coastlines, undulating ridges, deep forests and white sandy beaches. Parts of the trail are accessible by wheelchair.

The trail features around 90 permanent shelters at designated campsites. The trail is also part of the 6,000 kilometres (3,700 mi) long North Sea Trail, which passes through Sweden, Norway, Denmark, Germany, the Netherlands and the United Kingdom. It connects to the neighbouring trails of Blekingeleden to the east, sharing some sections with it and Hallandsleden to the north, meeting at Koarp in Hallandsåsen.

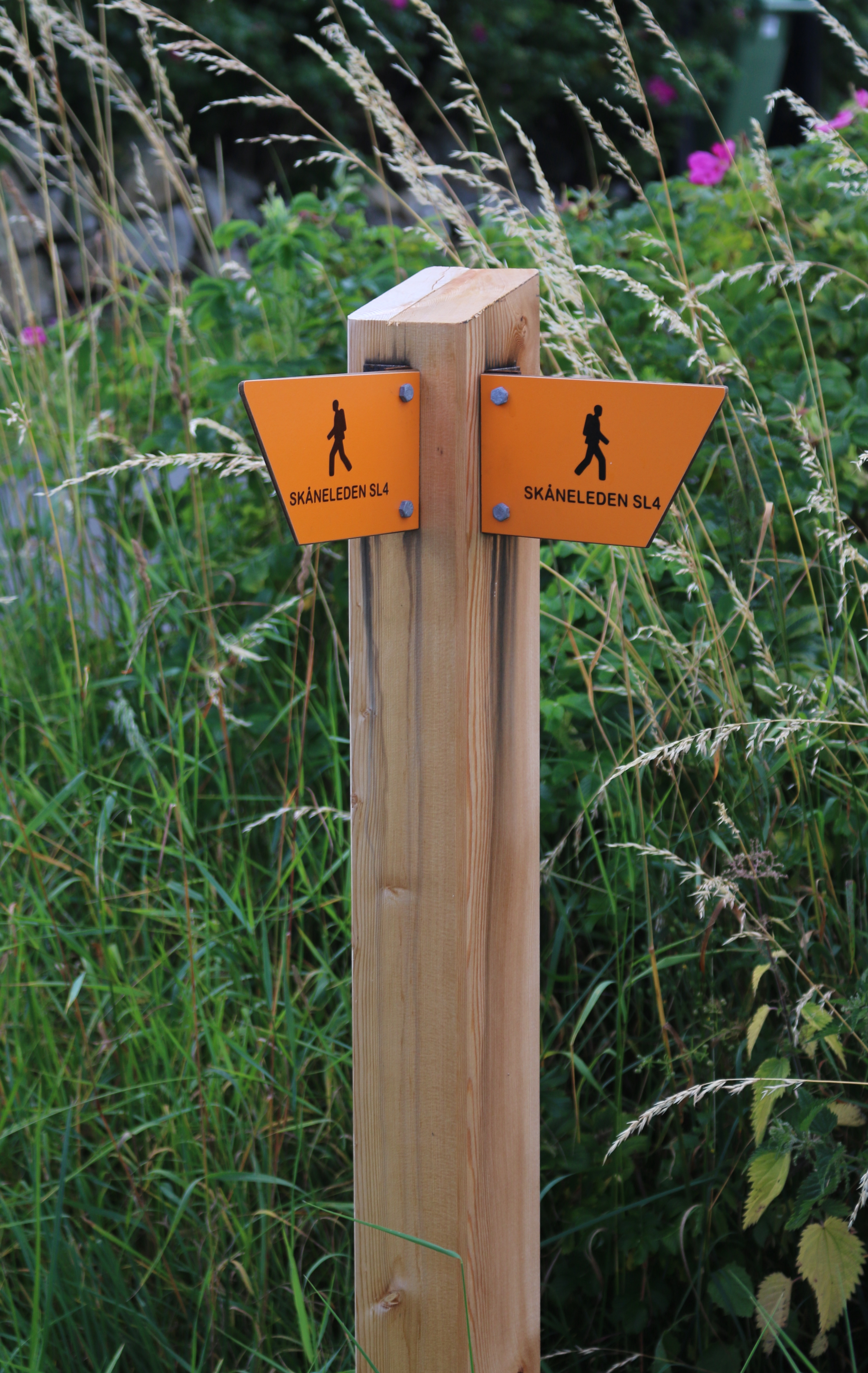
Modern Skåneleden signposts

As of 2023, visitor counters along the trail recorded between 5 and 300 hikers per day on most sections, and up to 5,000 daily visitors in popular locations such as Stenshuvud and Ales Stenar. The official Skåneleden website received over 500,000 people in 2024, and 1,830 maps of the Skåneleden trail were sold in 2021.

The management of Skåneleden is overseen by the Scanian Landscape Foundation (Stiftelsen Skånska Landskap) on behalf of Region Skåne. Since 2011, Region Skåne has served as the main authority responsible for the trail’s development and promotion, while the foundation handles its administration and coordinates maintenance efforts with 31 municipalities. Each municipality is responsible for maintaining its section of the trail and managing relations with landowners, sometimes carrying out the work directly and sometimes delegating it to other organizations. The trail passes through both public and privately owned land, with over 1,000 landowners granting access through formal agreements with local municipalities.

== History ==
The planning of Skåneleden began in 1973 as an initiative by Friluftsfrämjandet in collaboration with the County Administrative Board of Kristianstad County and various outdoor recreation organizations. Early discussions focused on identifying suitable routes that would integrate the trail into the landscape. By 1976, a project group was formed, including representatives from the County Labor Board, the Nature Conservation Unit of the County Administrative Board, and the Forest Management Board, along with landowner associations, outdoor organizations, and municipalities.

The section between Sölvesborg and Glimåkra in SL1 Kust till kust (Coast to coast) was the first inaugurated in 1978, with Sölvesborg Municipality assuming responsibility for its management. Over time, individual municipalities continued developing the network, leading to the creation of an extensive regional trail system.

In 1990, the Fritidsområden i Skåne Foundation was appointed as the main managing body, ensuring a more structured approach to municipal coordination. Since 2011, Region Skåne has served as the main authority overseeing the development of the trail, integrating its management into broader regional planning efforts.

In the 2020s, Skåneleden continued to expand its network of paths, inaugurating SL6 Vattenriket (Water Kingdom) in May 2024 and SL7 Sydkust (South Coast) in October 2024. However, in 2026, section 12 of SL4, between Snogeholm and Ystad was discontinued, following a termination of agreements with landowners.

== Sub-trails ==
=== SL1 Kust till kust (Coast to coast) ===
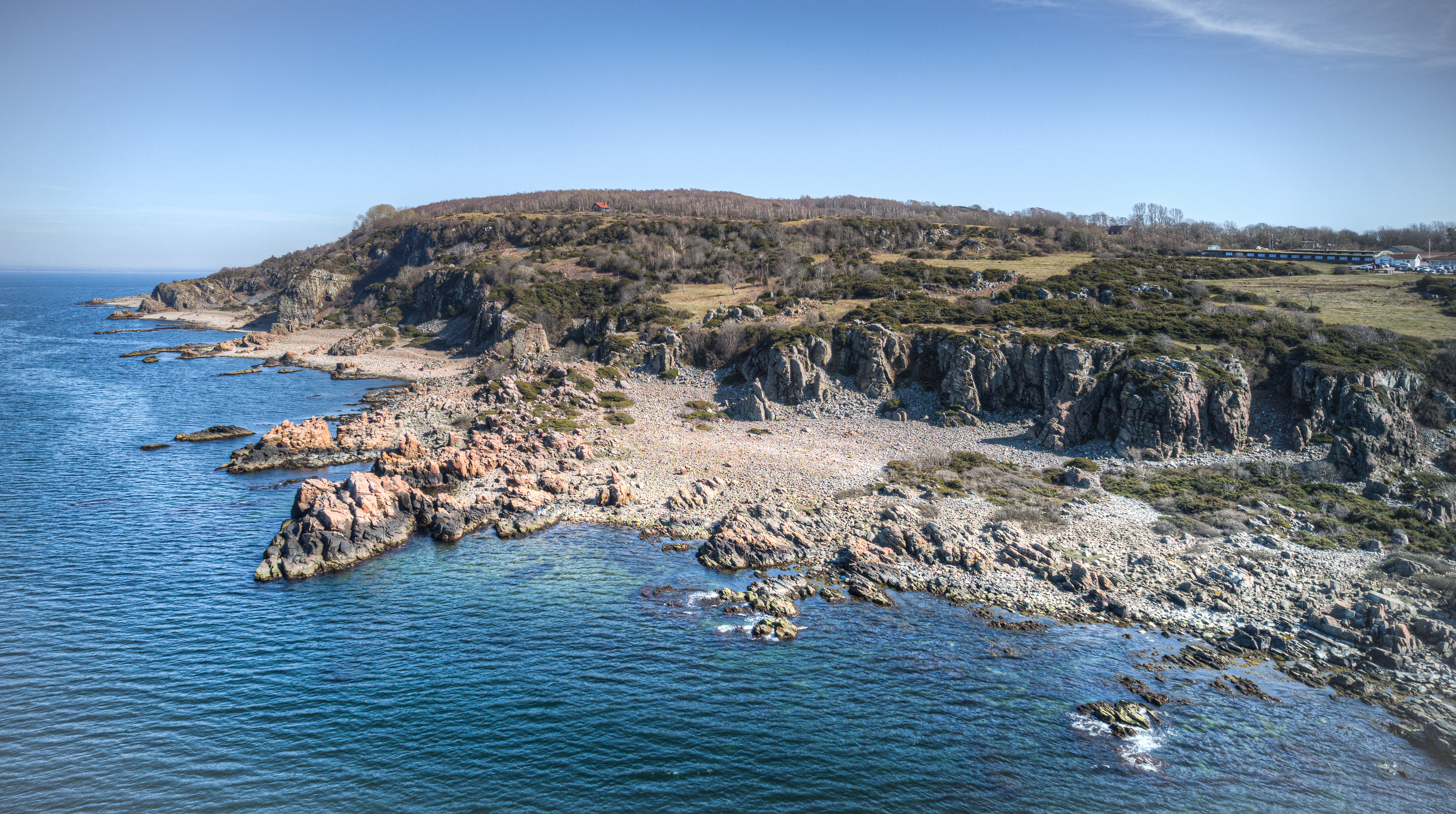
Hovs Hallar

The Kust till kust, or Coast to coast, trail extends 370 kilometres (230 mi) across 31 sections, running through the north of Scania, from Sölvesborg in the east to Ängelholm in the west. The eastern part of the trail passes through quiet woodlands and tranquil lakes, while the western sections feature more dramatic coastal cliffs.

As the northernmost sub-trail, SL1 partially passes through the neighboring counties of Blekinge and Halland. In sections 13 and 14, going between Bjärabygget and Brammarp, the trail goes through Hallandsåsen, a hilly area, featuring Halland's highest point at 226 metres (741 ft) above sea level. Sections 3 and 5 are partly in Blekinge, but section 3A is almost entirely in the neighbouring county. Lastly, sections 1 to 3A are considered to be a part of both Skåneleden and Blekingeleden.

Section	Length	Difficulty
1. Sölvesborg - Grundsjön	14 km (8.7 mi)	Red
2. Näsum - Näsums bokskogar	3 km (1.9 mi)	Blue
2. Grundsjön - Östafors	16 km (9.9 mi)	Blue
3. Östafors - Bökestad	9 km (5.6 mi)	Blue
3A. Bökestad - Olofström	12 km (7.5 mi)	Red
3A. Olofström - Halens camping	1 km (0.62 mi)	Green
4. Bökestad - Brotorpet	13 km (8.1 mi)	Red
5. Brotorpet - Vesslarp	13 km (8.1 mi)	Blue
6. Vesslarp - Glimåkra	19 km (12 mi)	Blue
6. Glimåkra - Trollabadet	1.8 km (1.1 mi)	Green
7. Glimåkra - Osby	18 km (11 mi)	Blue
8. Osby - Verum	24 km (15 mi)	Blue
9. Verum - Vittsjö	12 km (7.5 mi)	Blue
10. Vittsjö - Hårsjö	8 km (5.0 mi)	Blue
11. Hårsjö - Lärkesholm	20 km (12 mi)	Blue
12. Lärkesholm - Bjärabygget	13 km (8.1 mi)	Red
12A. Lärkesholm - Grytåsa	17 km (11 mi)	Blue
13. Bjärabygget - Koarp	17 km (11 mi)	Red
14. Koarp - Brammarp	17 km (11 mi)	Red
15. Brammarp - Båstad	12 km (7.5 mi)	Red
15. Båstad	1.9 km (1.2 mi)	Blue
16. Båstad - Hovs Hallar	16 km (9.9 mi)	Red
16. Båstad - Skummeslöv	2 km (1.2 mi)	Green
16. Båstad train station	2.6 km (1.6 mi)	Green
17. Hovs Hallar - Torekov	8 km (5.0 mi)	Blue
18. Torekov - Vejbystrand	20 km (12 mi)	Blue
19. Vejbystrand - Hålehall	11 km (6.8 mi)	Red
20. Hålehall - Örlid	9 km (5.6 mi)	Blue
21. Ängelsbäcksstrand - Båstad	14 km (8.7 mi)	Red
22. Vejbystrand - Ängelholm/Utvälinge	16 km (9.9 mi)	Blue
23. Ängelholm - Utvälinge	7.5 km (4.7 mi)	Green
Difficulty: Green: Even and firm ground: The terrain is generally flat. The hike requires no need to use your hands for support. No obstacles. Bridges are always present when crossing waterways.; Blue: Uneven and/or soft ground: Some changes in elevation. Certain sections may require hand support to maintain balance. There may be obstacles such as low stiles and short stairs. Minor obstacles like stones and roots. Boardwalks are present.; Red: Loose or slippery ground combined with steep sections: Technical parts require hand support. There may be obstacles such as high stiles and longer stairs. Frequent sections with stones and/or roots. Boardwalks with deeper surrounding water.
Source: Skåneleden

=== SL2 Nord till syd (North to south) ===
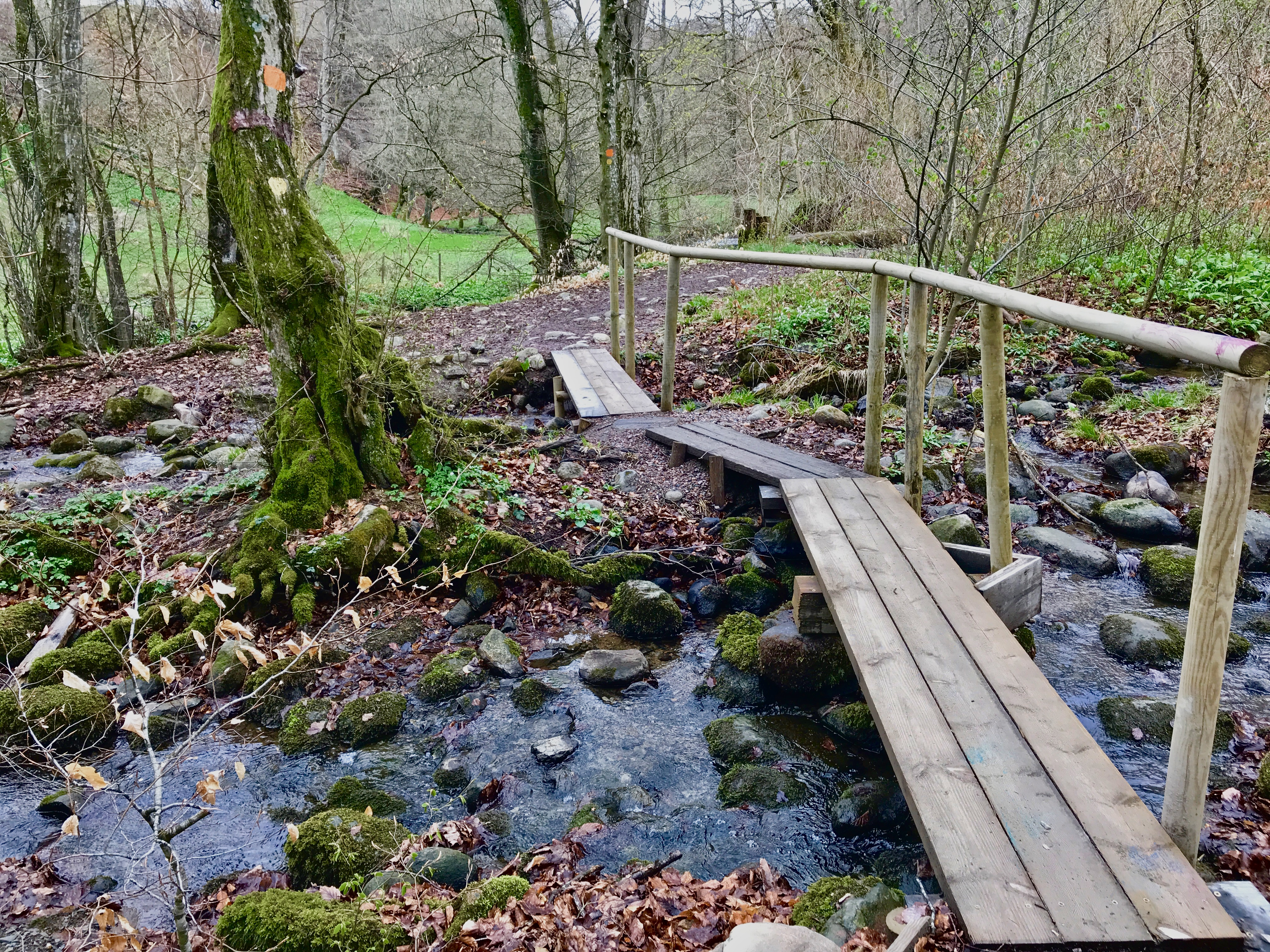
Path through Rövarekulan

The Nord till syd, or North to south, trail stretches 325 kilometres (202 mi) over 33 sections, from Hårsjö (west of Vittsjö) in the north to Trelleborg on the southern coast. The trail leads through dense woodlands, savanna-like open landscapes, and historic estates with diverse flora. The trail features several circular paths through nature reserves such as Skrylle, Fulltofta and Hovdala.

Section	Length	Difficulty
1. Hårsjö - Olastorp	7 km (4.3 mi)	Blue
2. Olastorp - Vedema	13 km (8.1 mi)	Red
3. Vedema - Hässleholm	22 km (14 mi)	Red
4. Hässleholm - Göingeåsen	12.5 km (7.8 mi)	Red
4A. Göingeåsen - Hovdala	11 km (6.8 mi)	Red
4B. Hovdala - Skyrup	20 km (12 mi)	Red
4C. Skyrup - Hässleholm	16 km (9.9 mi)	Blue
5. Göingeåsen - Lillsjödal	12 km (7.5 mi)	Red
6. Lillsjödal - Frostavallen	21 km (13 mi)	Blue
6. Lillsjödal - Maglebjär/Tjörnarp	3 km (1.9 mi)	Blue
6. Lillsjödal - Maglebjär/Sösdala	3 km (1.9 mi)	Blue
7. Frostavallen - Höör	7 km (4.3 mi)	Blue
8. Höör - Bjeveröd	11 km (6.8 mi)	Red
9. Bjeveröd - Hörby Ringsjöstrand	17 km (11 mi)	Red
9A. Fulltofta circular path	10 km (6.2 mi)	Blue
10. Hörby Ringsjöstrand - Rövarekulan	13 km (8.1 mi)	Red
11. Rövarekulan - Höghult	9 km (5.6 mi)	Red
12. Höghult - Krankesjön	11 km (6.8 mi)	Red
13. Krankesjön - Väderkullen	14 km (8.7 mi)	Blue
13A. Skrylleslingan	15 km (9.3 mi)	Red
14. Väderkullen - Häckeberga	8 km (5.0 mi)	Red
14. Väderkullen - Häckeberga/Veberöd	3 km (1.9 mi)	Blue
15. Häckeberga - Sturup	11 km (6.8 mi)	Blue
15. Häckeberga - Sturup/Genarp	2 km (1.2 mi)	Blue
15A. Sturup - Dörröd	14 km (8.7 mi)	Blue
16. Sturup - Eksholmssjön	7 km (4.3 mi)	Green
16. Sturup - Eksholmssjön/Airport	2 km (1.2 mi)	Green
17. Eksholmssjön - Torup	9 km (5.6 mi)	Blue
18. Torup - Malmö Bulltofta	14 km (8.7 mi)	Green
19. Dörröd - Blentarp	12 km (7.5 mi)	Blue
20. Blentarp - Snogeholm	12 km (7.5 mi)	Blue
21. Torup - Fru Alstad	18 km (11 mi)	Blue
22. Fru Alstad - Trelleborg	13 km (8.1 mi)	Green
Difficulty: Green: Even and firm ground: The terrain is generally flat. The hike requires no need to use your hands for support. No obstacles. Bridges are always present when crossing waterways.; Blue: Uneven and/or soft ground: Some changes in elevation. Certain sections may require hand support to maintain balance. There may be obstacles such as low stiles and short stairs. Minor obstacles like stones and roots. Boardwalks are present.; Red: Loose or slippery ground combined with steep sections: Technical parts require hand support. There may be obstacles such as high stiles and longer stairs. Frequent sections with stones and/or roots. Boardwalks with deeper surrounding water.
Source: Skåneleden

=== SL3 Ås till ås (Ridge to ridge) ===
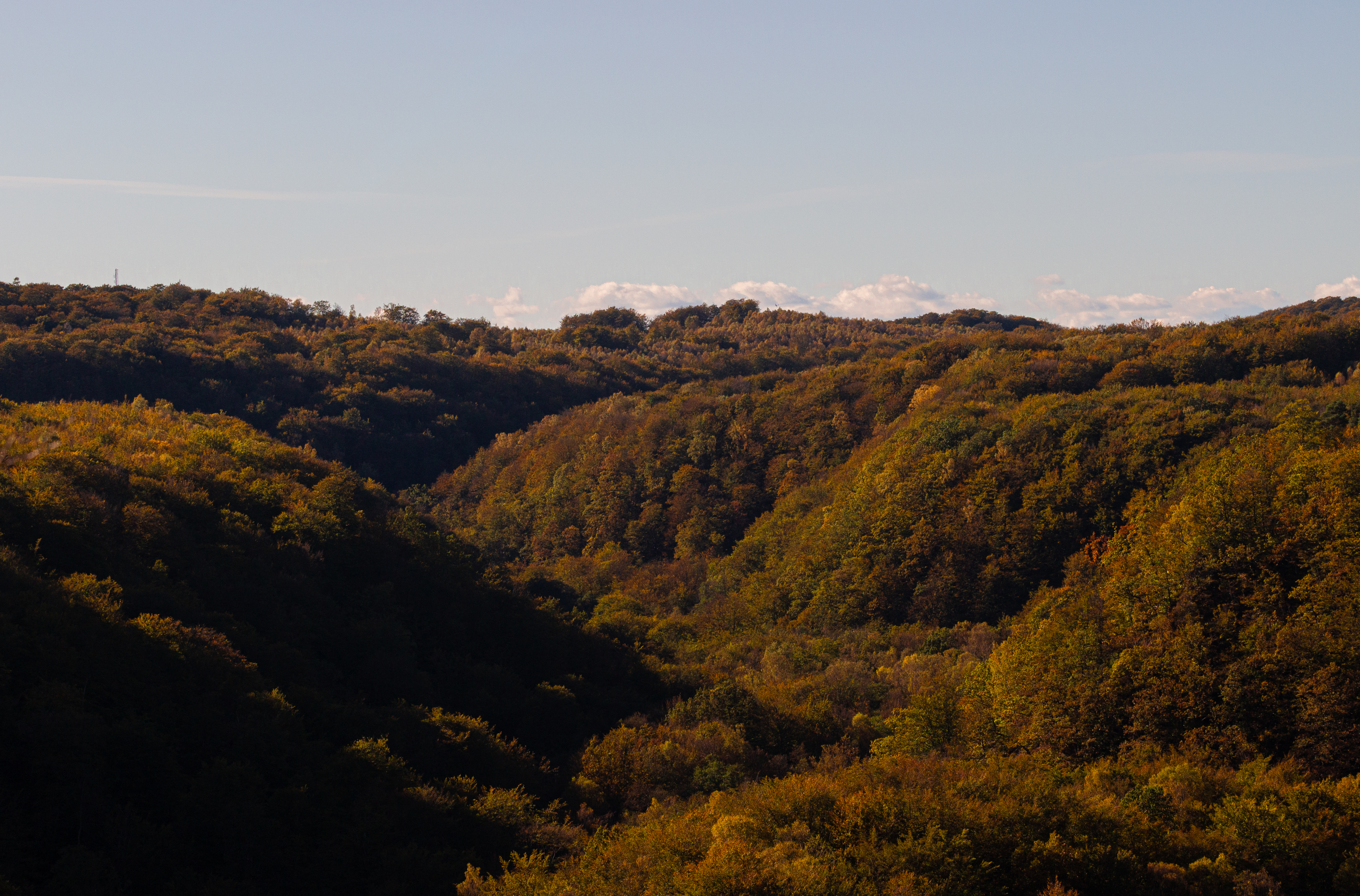
Söderåsen

The Ås till ås, or Ridge to ridge, trail spans 162 kilometres (101 mi) across 16 sections, linking Åstorp in the northwest, at the base of the Söderåsen ridge, to the Brösarp hills in Österlen, to the southeast. This subtrail passes through Söderåsen National Park, the largest national park in Skåne, known for its dramatic ravines.

Section	Length	Difficulty
1. Åstorp - Hålebäck	10 km (6.2 mi)	Blue
2. Hålebäck - Krika skog	11 km (6.8 mi)	Red
3. Krika skog - Klåveröd	14 km (8.7 mi)	Blue
4. Klåveröd - Söderåsen	6 km (3.7 mi)	Red
5. Söderåsen - Jällabjär	11 km (6.8 mi)	Red
6. Jällabjär - Södra Hultarp	11 km (6.8 mi)	Red
7. Södra Hultarp - Frostavallen	12 km (7.5 mi)	Red
8. Frostavallen - Höör	7 km (4.3 mi)	Blue
9. Höör - Bjeveröd	11 km (6.8 mi)	Red
9. Onsvala spring (campsite)	1 km (0.62 mi)	Green
10. Bjeveröd - Ekeröd	12 km (7.5 mi)	Red
11. Ekeröd - Timan	13 km (8.1 mi)	Blue
12. Timan - Rebbetuaröd	21 km (13 mi)	Blue
13. Rebbetuaröd - Agusa	7 km (4.3 mi)	Blue
14. Agusa - Brösarp	15.6 km (9.7 mi)	Red
14. Brösarp bus station	0.3 km (0.19 mi)	Green
Difficulty: Green: Even and firm ground: The terrain is generally flat. The hike requires no need to use your hands for support. No obstacles. Bridges are always present when crossing waterways.; Blue: Uneven and/or soft ground: Some changes in elevation. Certain sections may require hand support to maintain balance. There may be obstacles such as low stiles and short stairs. Minor obstacles like stones and roots. Boardwalks are present.; Red: Loose or slippery ground combined with steep sections: Technical parts require hand support. There may be obstacles such as high stiles and longer stairs. Frequent sections with stones and/or roots. Boardwalks with deeper surrounding water.
Source: Skåneleden

=== SL4 Österlen ===
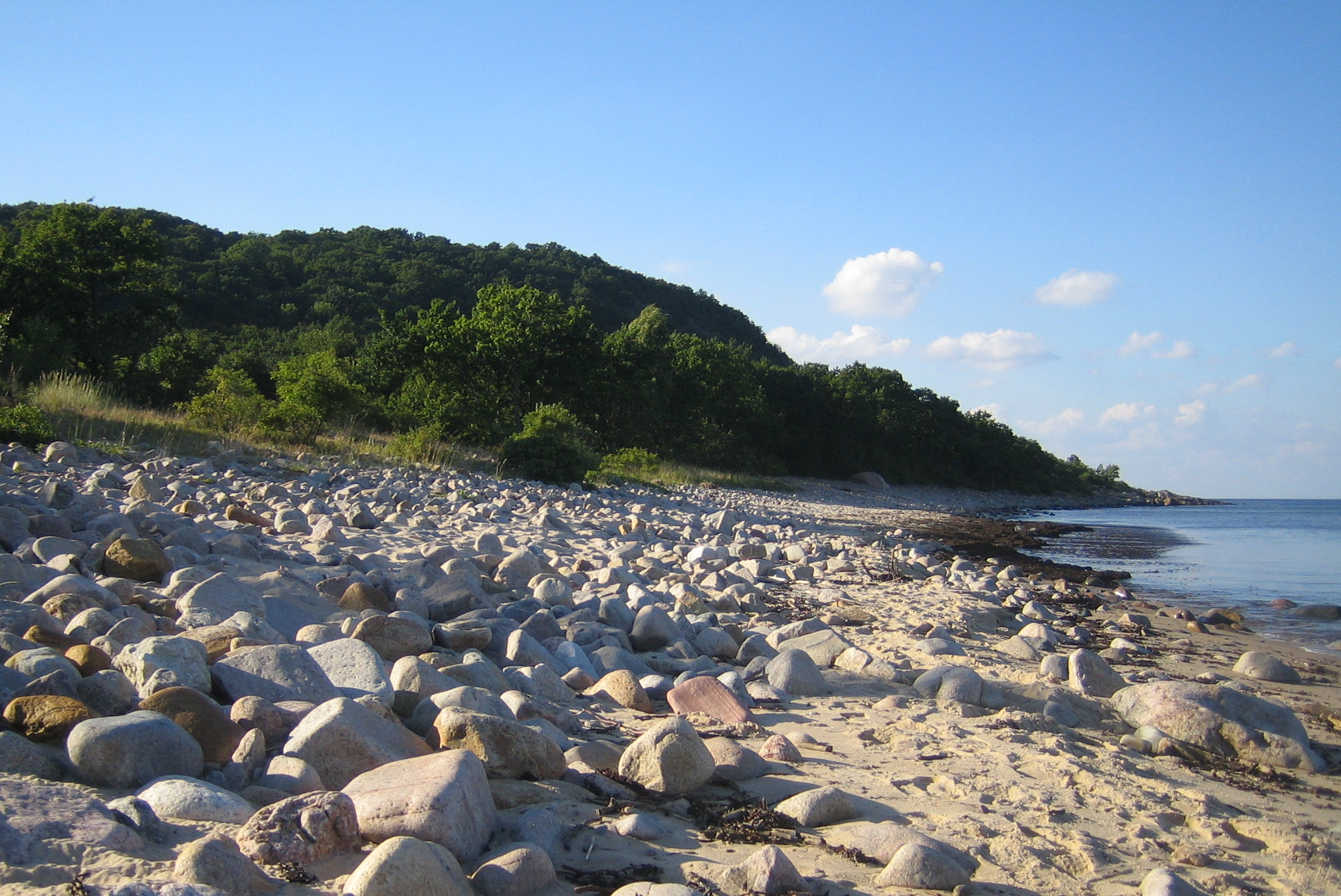
Stenshuvud

The Österlen trail, named after the region it traverses, covers 164 kilometres (102 mi) across 14 sections, in southeastern Skåne. It starts in Ystad and ends in Snogeholm, passing through Simrishamn, Stenshuvud National Park, Kivik, Brösarp and Hallamölla waterfall. The landscape is characterized by long sandy beaches, picturesque fishing villages, and humid beech woodlands.

The route was formerly a circular route, with section 12 connecting Snogeholm and Ystad. This section was discontinued in 2026, following a termination of agreements with landowners.

Section	Length	Difficulty
1. Ystad - Nybrostrand	8.1 km (5.0 mi)	Green
2. Nybrostrand - Löderup's beach	18 km (11 mi)	Red
3. Löderup's beach - Borrby's beach	11 km (6.8 mi)	Blue
4. Borrby's beach - Simrishamn	20 km (12 mi)	Blue
5. Simrishamn - Kivik	20 km (12 mi)	Blue
6. Kivik - Brösarp	11.2 km (7.0 mi)	Blue
7. Brösarp - Andrarums alum mill	12.9 km (8.0 mi)	Blue
7. Brösarp bus station	0.3 km (0.19 mi)	Green
7A. Verkasjön - Agusa	9 km (5.6 mi)	Red
7B. Agusa - Brösarp	14 km (8.7 mi)	Red
8. Verkasjön - Heinge	8 km (5.0 mi)	Red
9. Heinge - Lövestad's ridges	6 km (3.7 mi)	Red
10. Lövestad's ridges - Vitabäck	14 km (8.7 mi)	Blue
11. Vitabäck - Snogeholm	10 km (6.2 mi)	Blue
Difficulty: Green: Even and firm ground: The terrain is generally flat. The hike requires no need to use your hands for support. No obstacles. Bridges are always present when crossing waterways.; Blue: Uneven and/or soft ground: Some changes in elevation. Certain sections may require hand support to maintain balance. There may be obstacles such as low stiles and short stairs. Minor obstacles like stones and roots. Boardwalks are present.; Red: Loose or slippery ground combined with steep sections: Technical parts require hand support. There may be obstacles such as high stiles and longer stairs. Frequent sections with stones and/or roots. Boardwalks with deeper surrounding water.
Source: Skåneleden

=== SL5 Öresund ===
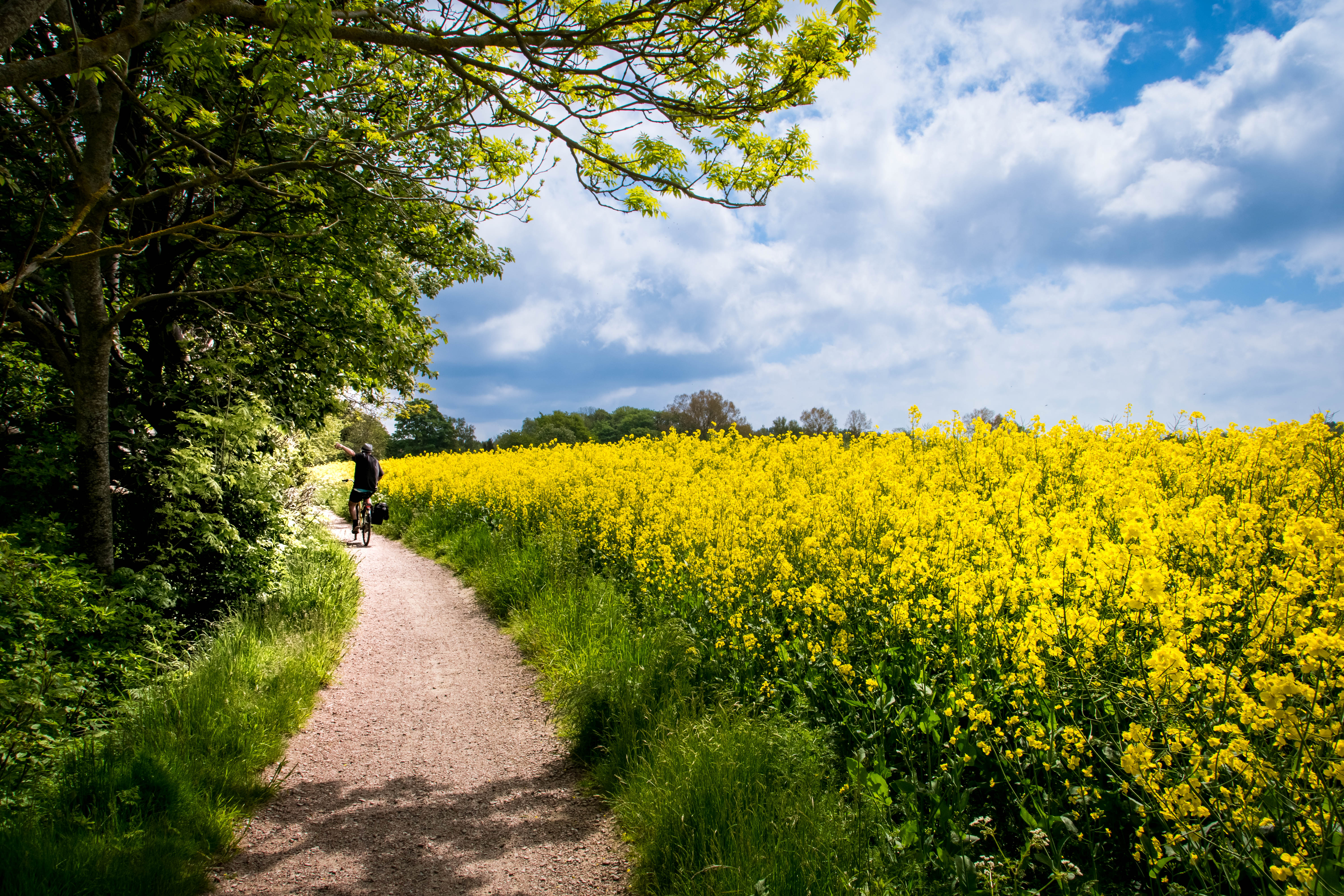
Path through Ven

The Öresund trail, named after the Öresund strait, covers 214 kilometres (133 mi) across 33 sections, following the Scanian west coast between Utvälinge and the Falsterbonäset Peninsula. It includes two circular paths, one around the Falsterbonäset Peninsula and another around the island Ven. The trail offers expansive sea views and traverses several nature reserves.

Section	Length	Difficulty
1. Utvälinge - Jonstorp	11 km (6.8 mi)	Blue
2. Jonstorp - Arild	9 km (5.6 mi)	Blue
3. Arild - Mölle	16 km (9.9 mi)	Red
3A. Mölle - Himmelstorp	3 km (1.9 mi)	Blue
4A. Kullarulla (Wheelchair accessible alternative to 4.)	10.5 km (6.5 mi)	Green
4. Mölle - Höganäs	12 km (7.5 mi)	Green
5. Höganäs - Domsten	11 km (6.8 mi)	Green
6. Domsten - Helsingborg	14 km (8.7 mi)	Red
6. Domsten - Helsingborg/Sofiero	1.4 km (0.87 mi)	Green
7. Helsingborg - Rydebäck	16 km (9.9 mi)	Green
8. Rydebäck - Landskrona	13 km (8.1 mi)	Red
8. Rydebäck - Landskrona/Glumslöv	4 km (2.5 mi)	Green
9. Ven circular path	12 km (7.5 mi)	Blue
10. Landskrona - Järavallen	14 km (8.7 mi)	Blue
9. Landskrona - Tide windbreaker	1.6 km (0.99 mi)	Green
10. Landskrona - Järavallen/Landskrona station	1 km (0.62 mi)	Green
11. Järavallen - Löddeköpinge	21 km (13 mi)	Blue
10. Löddeköpinge	2 km (1.2 mi)	Green
11. Löddeköpinge - Bjärred	8 km (5.0 mi)	Green
13. Bjärred - Lomma	6 km (3.7 mi)	Green
13. Lomma - Spillepeng	5 km (3.1 mi)	Green
14. Spillepeng - Bulltofta	6.5 km (4.0 mi)	Green
14. Arlöv/Burlöv station	1.4 km (0.87 mi)	Green
14A. Bulltofta	1.2 km (0.75 mi)	Green
15. Bulltofta - Malmö C	6.4 km (4.0 mi)	Green
16. Spillepeng - Malmö C	6.3 km (3.9 mi)	Green
17. Malmö C - Limhamn	9.2 km (5.7 mi)	Green
18. Limhamn - Klagshamn	13.3 km (8.3 mi)	Green
19. Klagshamn - Falsterbo Canal	21 km (13 mi)	Green
19. Foteviken	0.5 km (0.31 mi)	Green
20. Falsterbo Canal - Skanör	16.2 km (10.1 mi)	Blue
21. Skanör harbour - Falsterbo	9.1 km (5.7 mi)	Blue
22. Falsterbo - Falsterbo Canal	8.2 km (5.1 mi)	Green
Difficulty: Green: Even and firm ground: The terrain is generally flat. The hike requires no need to use your hands for support. No obstacles. Bridges are always present when crossing waterways.; Blue: Uneven and/or soft ground: Some changes in elevation. Certain sections may require hand support to maintain balance. There may be obstacles such as low stiles and short stairs. Minor obstacles like stones and roots. Boardwalks are present.; Red: Loose or slippery ground combined with steep sections: Technical parts require hand support. There may be obstacles such as high stiles and longer stairs. Frequent sections with stones and/or roots. Boardwalks with deeper surrounding water.
Source: Skåneleden

=== SL6 Vattenriket (Water Kingdom) ===
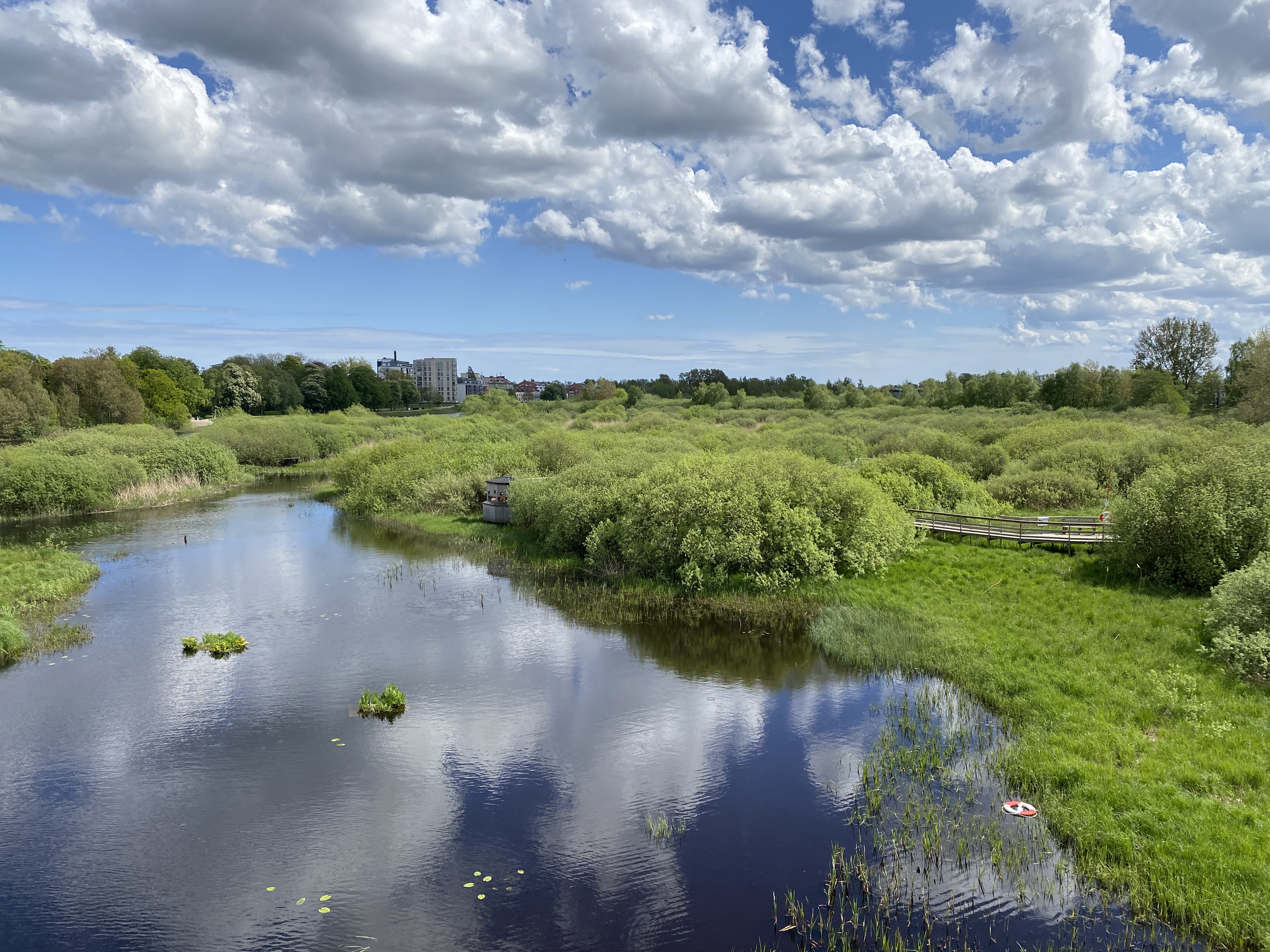
Vattenriket

The Vattenriket, or Water Kingdom, trail extends 190 kilometres (120 mi) over 14 sections, running from Simontorp or Breanäs in northeastern Skåne to Brösarp in Österlen. The trail passes through Kristianstad Vattenriket, a UNESCO-designated biosphere reserve known for its wetlands and rich birdlife. The landscape transitions from lush inland greenery to a more exposed coastal terrain, with several small villages along the way. This subtrail incorporated the already existing hiking path Degebergaleden, passing through Forsakar nature reserve.

Section	Length	Difficulty
1. Brösarp - Maglehem	10 km (6.2 mi)	Blue
2. Maglehem - Nyehusen	16 km (9.9 mi)	Blue
2A. Maglehem - Degeberga	18 km (11 mi)	Blue
3. Nyehusen - Åhus	16 km (9.9 mi)	Blue
4. Åhus - Kristianstad	23 km (14 mi)	Green
4A. Åhus circular path	17 km (11 mi)	Green
5. Kristianstad - Norra Lingenäset	12 km (7.5 mi)	Green
6. Norra Lingenäset - Österslöv	12 km (7.5 mi)	Green
7. Österslöv - Arkelstorp	9 km (5.6 mi)	Green
8. Arkelstorp - Immeln	10 km (6.2 mi)	Green
8A. Arkelstorp - Lerjevallen	8 km (5.0 mi)	Blue
9. Immeln - Sibbhult	14 km (8.7 mi)	Blue
10. Sibbhult - Simontorp	12 km (7.5 mi)	Blue
10A. Sibbhult - Breanäs	17 km (11 mi)	Blue
Difficulty: Green: Even and firm ground: The terrain is generally flat. The hike requires no need to use your hands for support. No obstacles. Bridges are always present when crossing waterways.; Blue: Uneven and/or soft ground: Some changes in elevation. Certain sections may require hand support to maintain balance. There may be obstacles such as low stiles and short stairs. Minor obstacles like stones and roots. Boardwalks are present.; Red: Loose or slippery ground combined with steep sections: Technical parts require hand support. There may be obstacles such as high stiles and longer stairs. Frequent sections with stones and/or roots. Boardwalks with deeper surrounding water.
Source: Skåneleden

=== SL7 Sydkust (South coast) ===
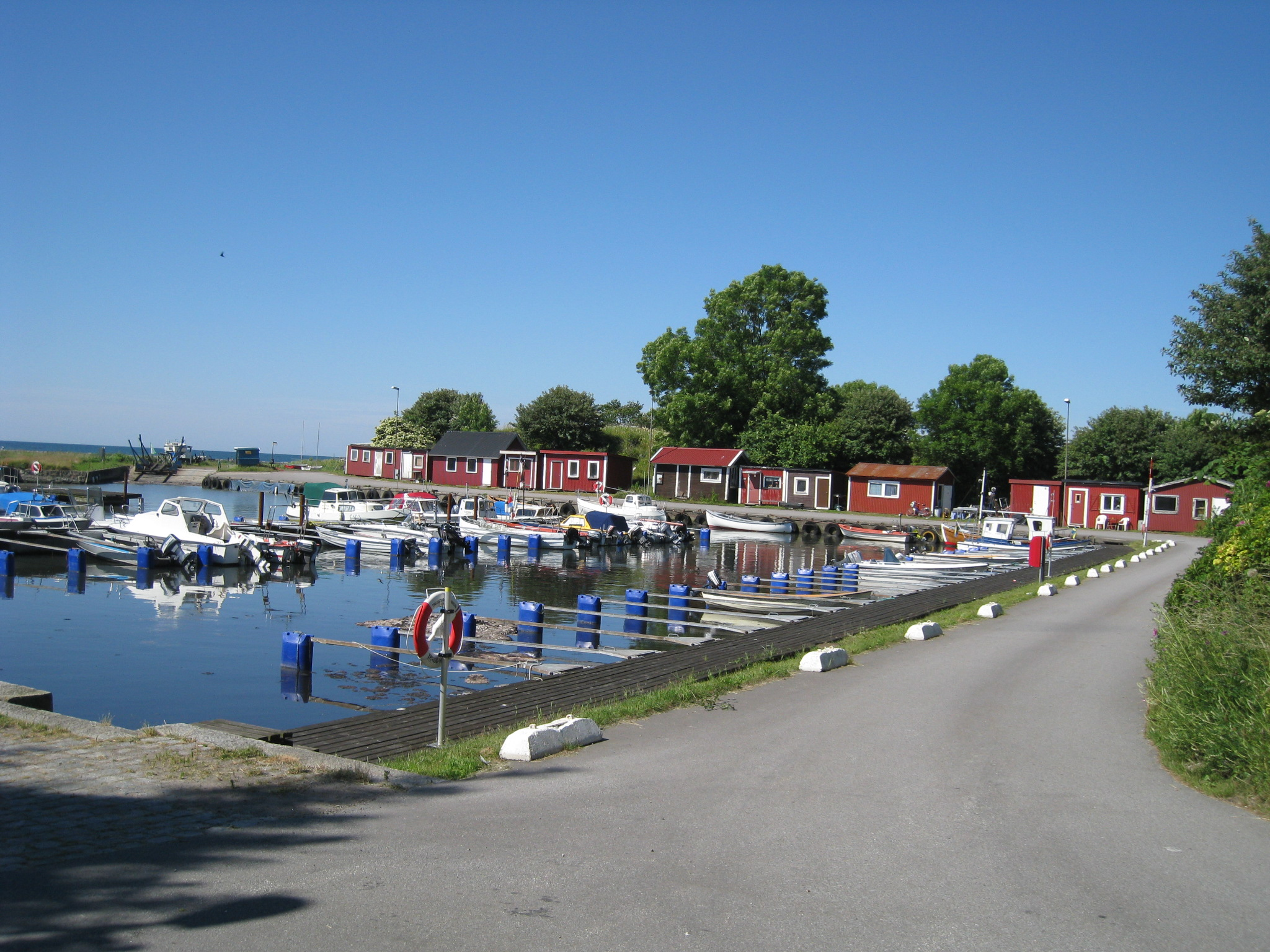
Smygehuk

The Sydkust or South coast trail runs 65 kilometres (40 mi) over 5 sections, along the southern coastline of Scania, from Skåre to Ystad, passing through Smygehuk, Sweden's southernmost point. The route provides hikers with easy access to coastal scenery and sandy beaches and is accessible in its entirety by bus.

Section	Length	Difficulty
1. Ystad - Mossbystrand	12.4 km (7.7 mi)	Green
2. Mossbystrand - Bingsmarken	11.7 km (7.3 mi)	Blue
3. Bingsmarken - Smygehamn	13.8 km (8.6 mi)	Blue
4. Smygehamn - Trelleborg	17.1 km (10.6 mi)	Blue
1. Skåre - Trelleborg	10 km (6.2 mi)	Green
Difficulty: Green: Even and firm ground: The terrain is generally flat. The hike requires no need to use your hands for support. No obstacles. Bridges are always present when crossing waterways.; Blue: Uneven and/or soft ground: Some changes in elevation. Certain sections may require hand support to maintain balance. There may be obstacles such as low stiles and short stairs. Minor obstacles like stones and roots. Boardwalks are present.; Red: Loose or slippery ground combined with steep sections: Technical parts require hand support. There may be obstacles such as high stiles and longer stairs. Frequent sections with stones and/or roots. Boardwalks with deeper surrounding water.
Source: Skåneleden

== Gallery ==
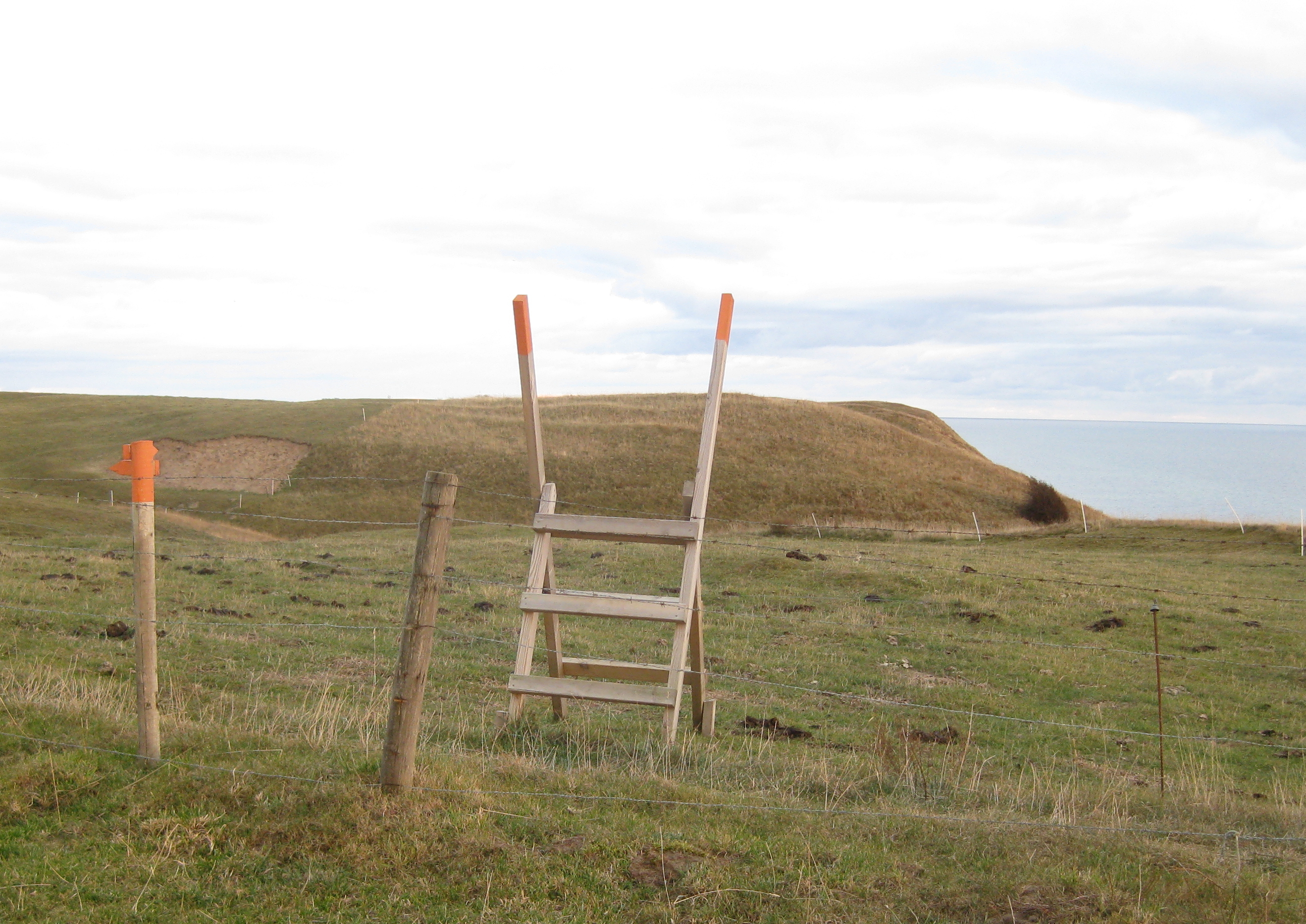
Hammars backar hill

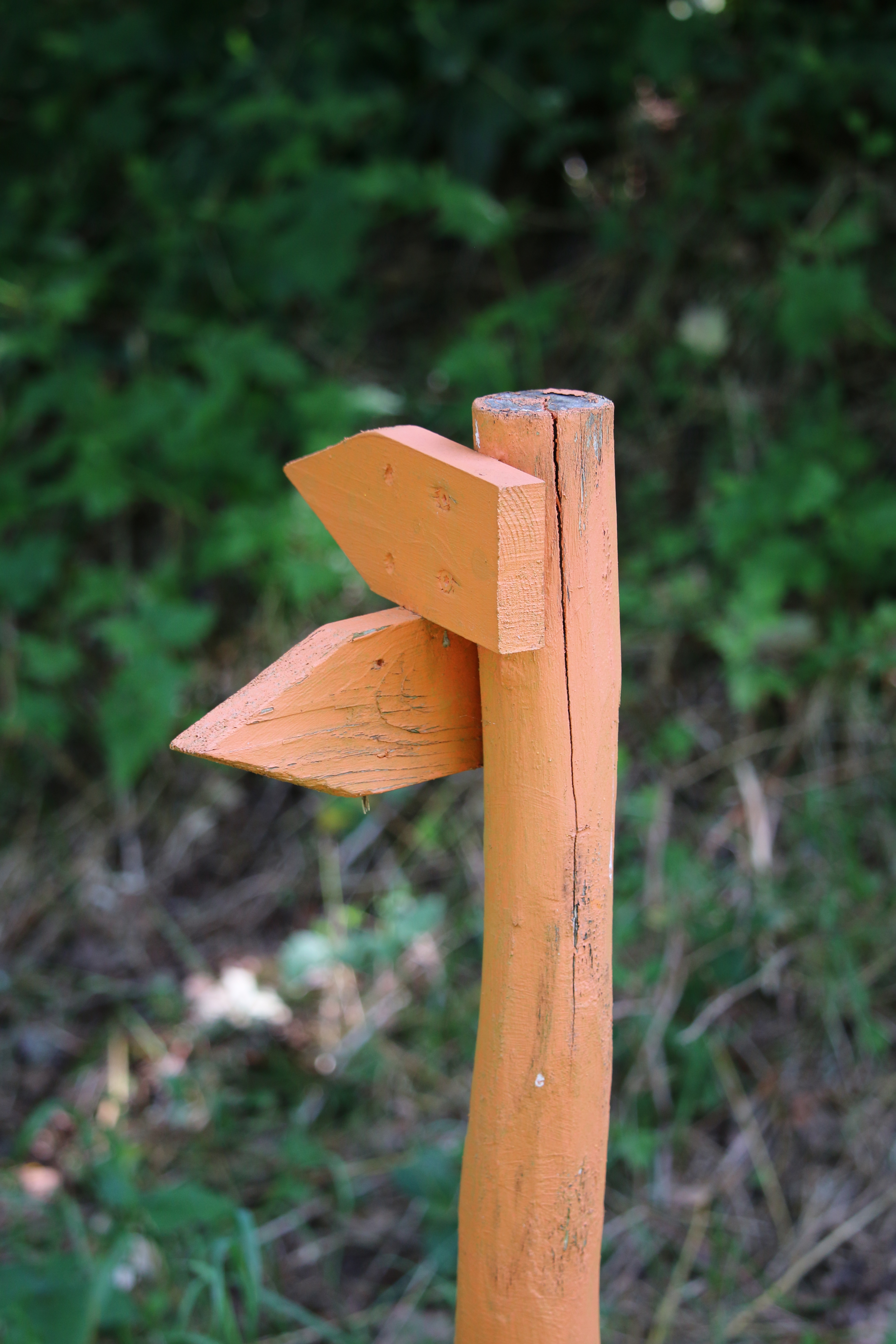
Older sign posts

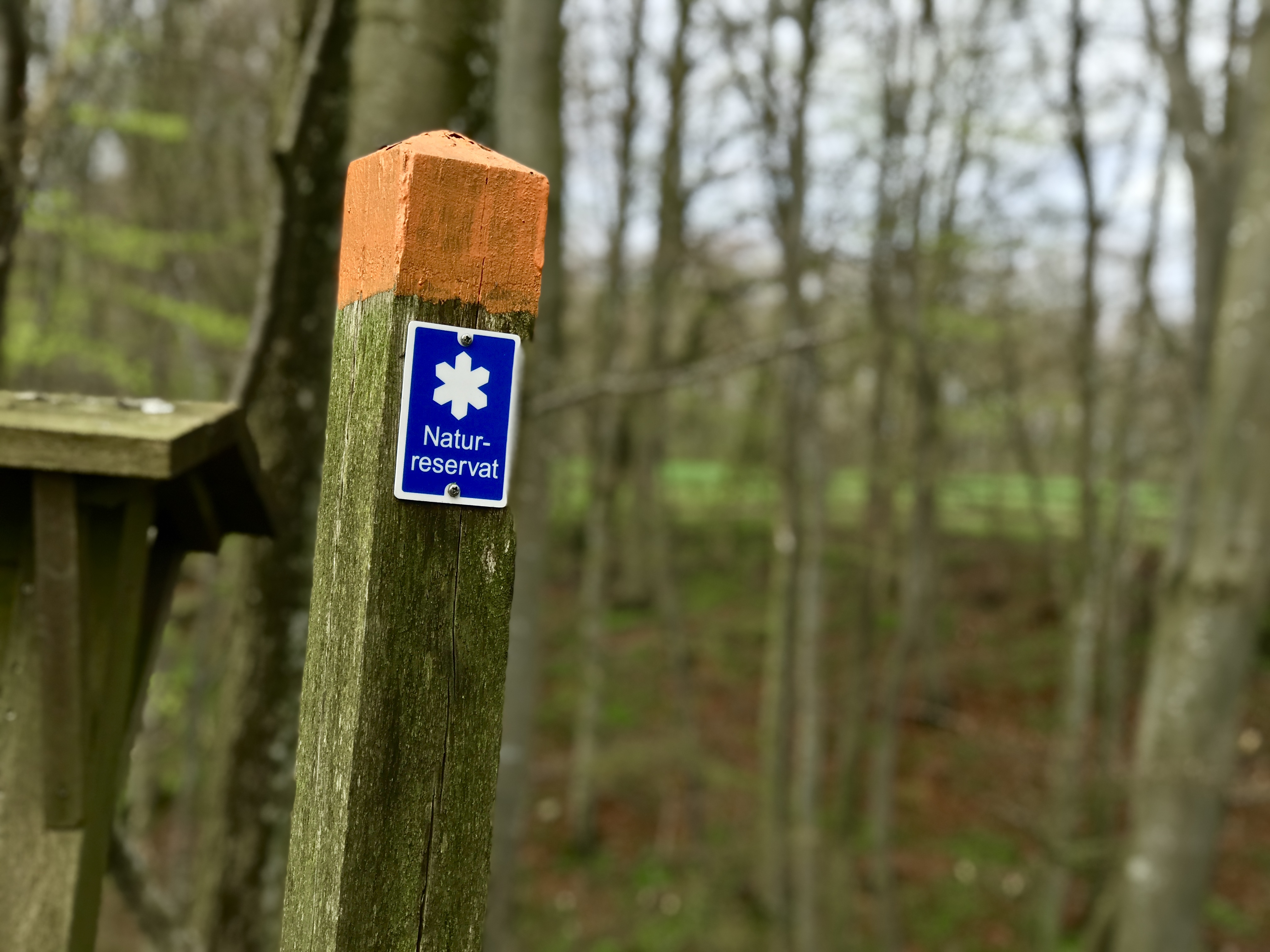
Marker

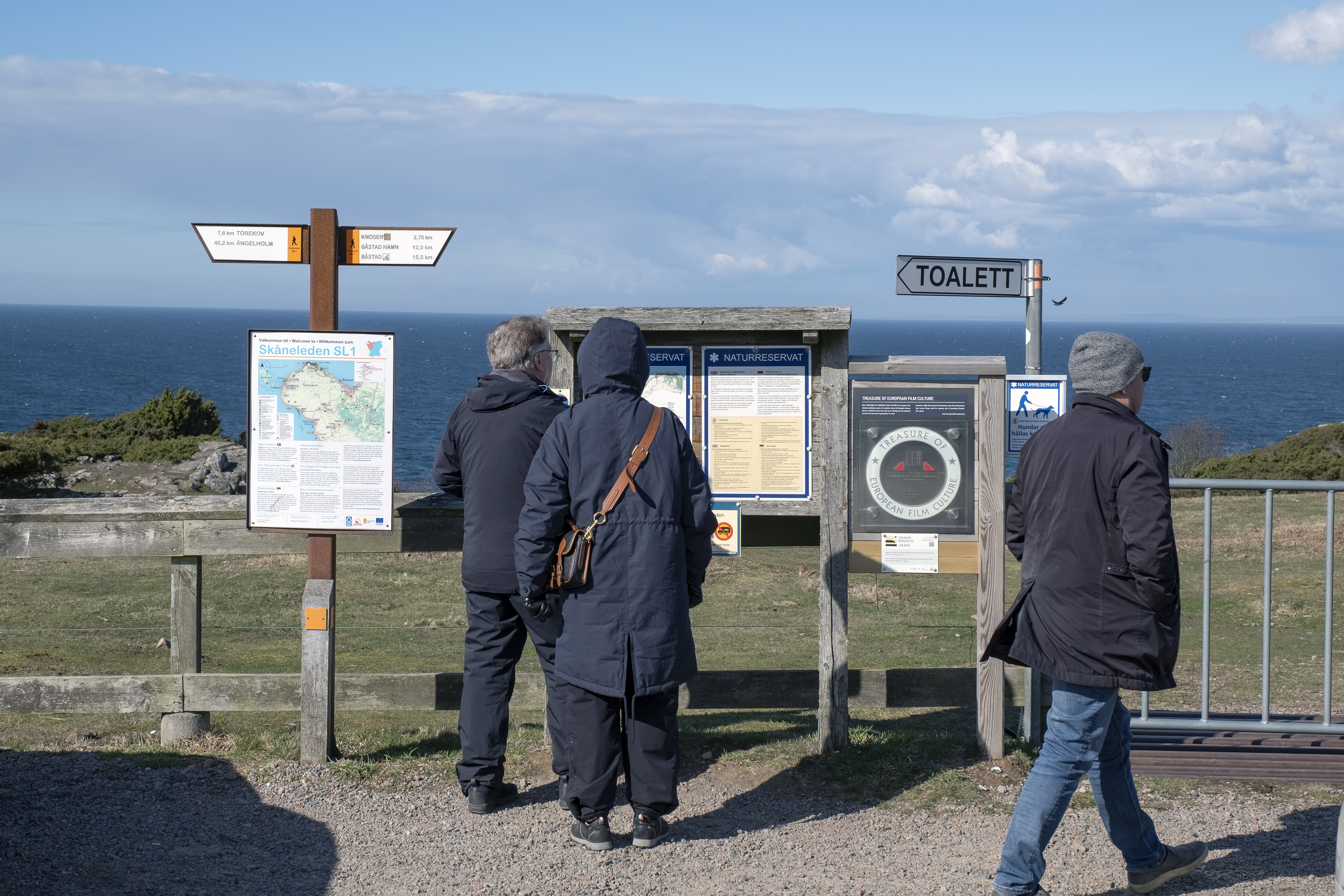
Signage between sections

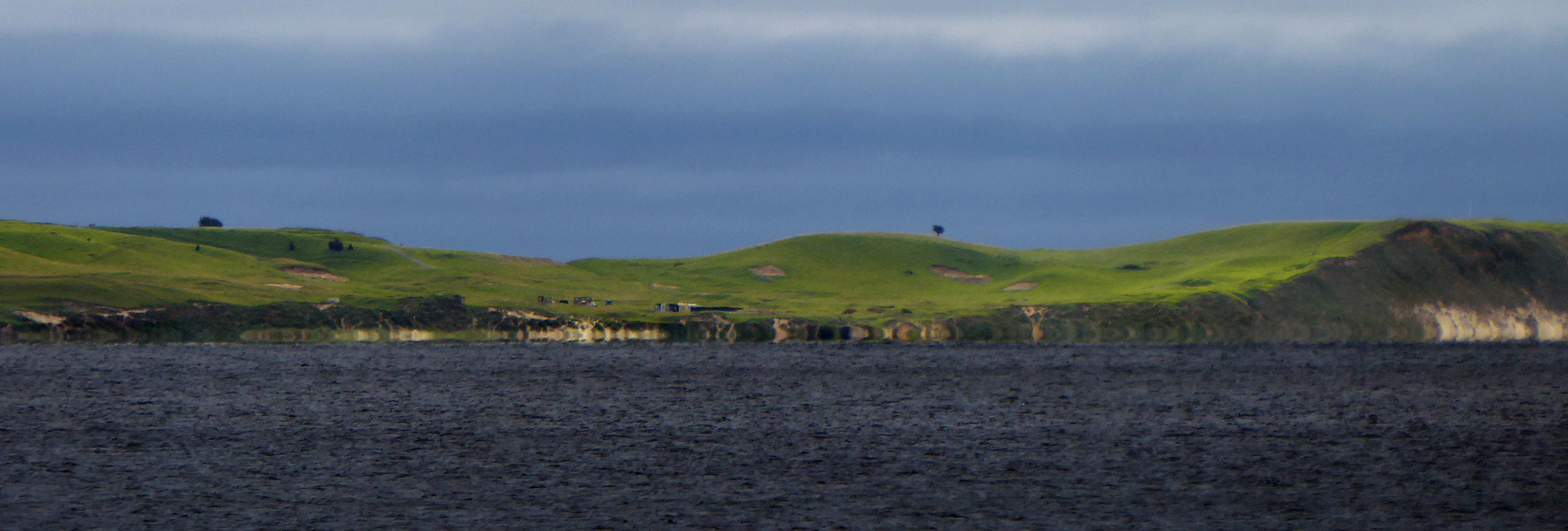
Hammars backar hills, seen from Ystad

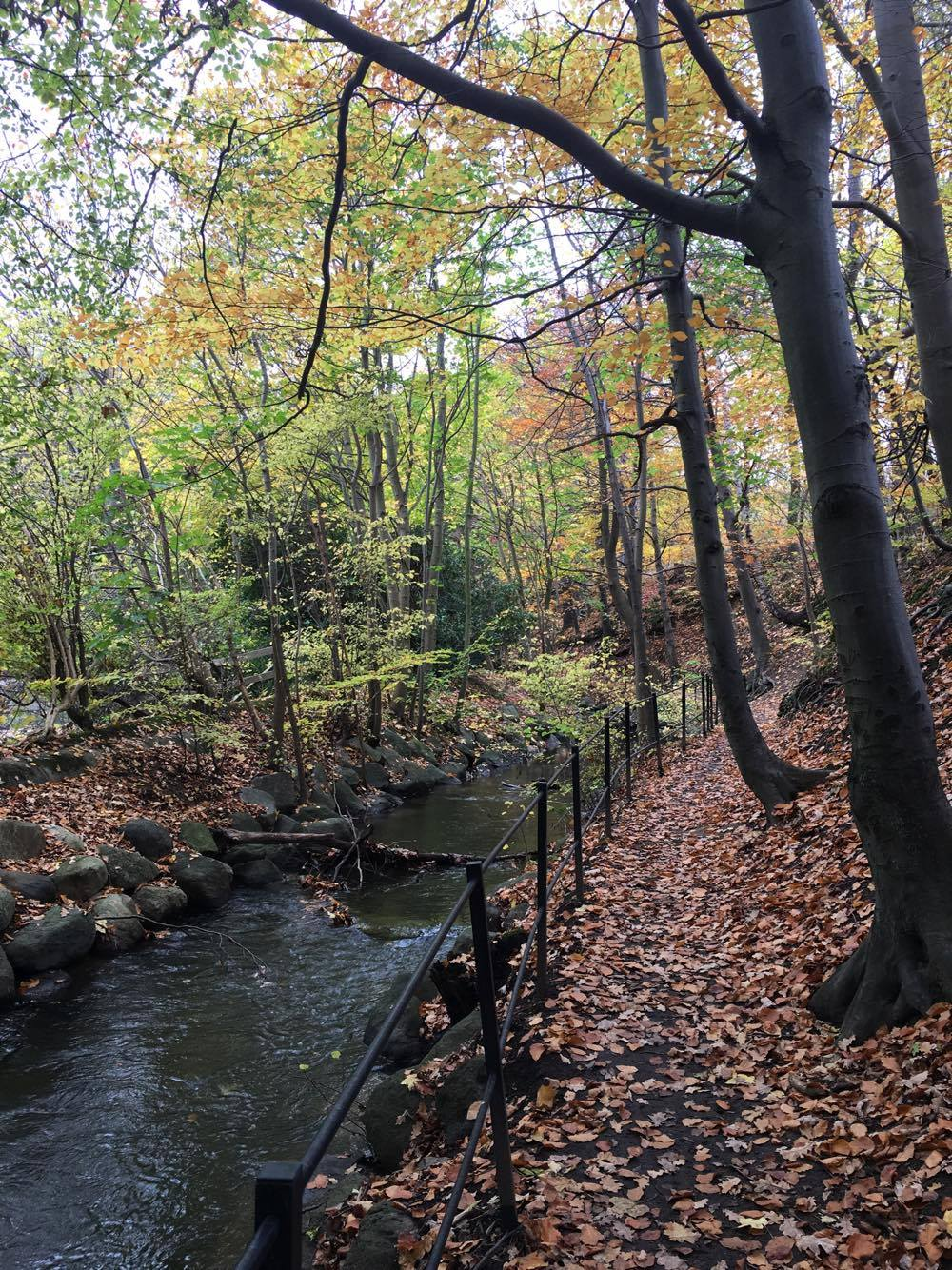
Between Helsingborg and Rydebäck
