= Vege River =

Vege River Vegeån
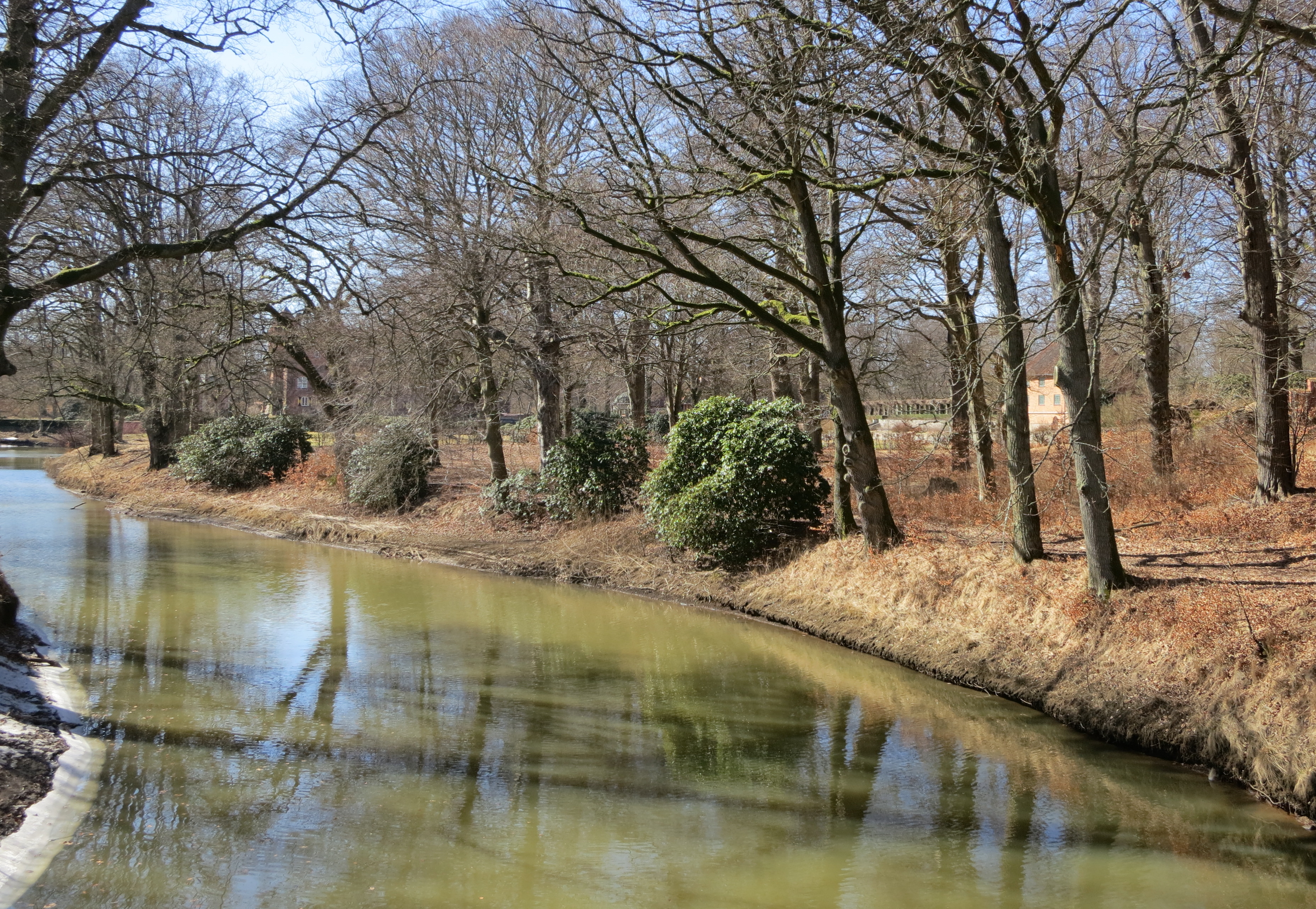
- Native name: Vege å (Swedish)

Location
- Country: Sweden
- County: Skåne
- Municipalities: Svalöv, Bjuv, Helsingborg, Åstorp, Ängelholm

Physical characteristics
- Mouth: Skälder Bay
  - location: Utvälinge
  - coordinates: 56°13′09″N 12°47′04″E
  - elevation: 0 m (0 ft)
- Length: 53.39 km (33.18 mi)
- Basin size: 488.1 km^{2} (188.5 sq mi)

Basin features
- Tributaries
  - left: Hasslarpsån
  - right: Humlebäcken

Vege River (Swedish: Vege å) is a river in Sweden.
