= Kristianstads Vattenrike Biosphere Reserve =

Protected swamp area in Scania, Sweden

Coordinates: 55°59′02″N 14°12′44″E

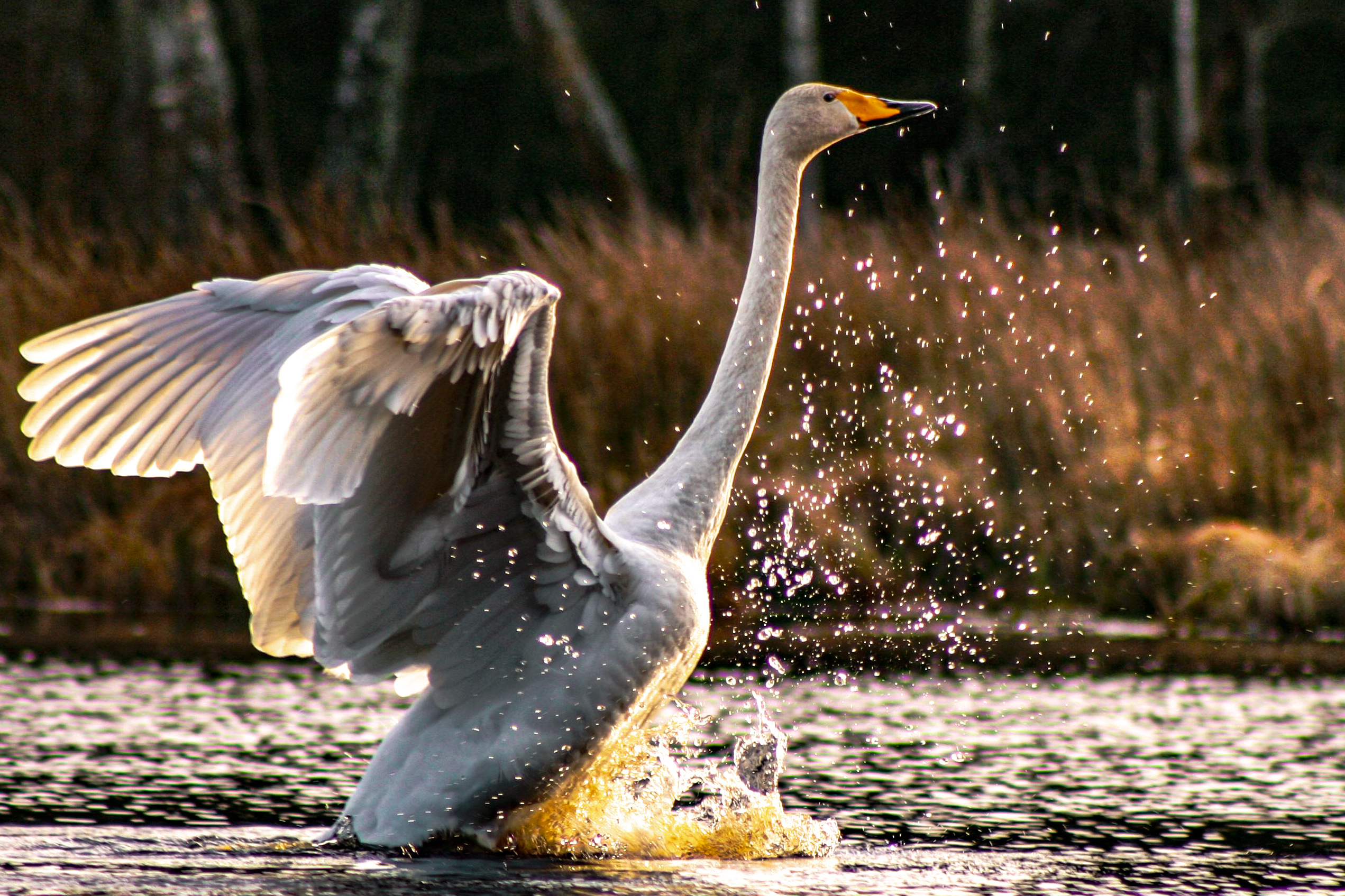
Swan landing on the water, late evening in Kristianstad vattenrike

Kristianstad Vattenrike Biosphere Reserve, a protected swamp area in the Hammarsjön Lake, surrounding the town of Kristianstad in Scania, southern Sweden. Sweden's lowest point is located in the reserve at 2.41 metres (7 ft 11 in) below sea level. The point is at the bottom of what was once Nosabyviken, a bay on the lake of Hammarsjön. The bay was drained in the 1860s by John Nun Milner, an engineer, to get more arable land for Kristianstad.

Established in 2005, it provides habitat for a large number of endangered species of birds and fish. There are also deposits remaining from the Ice Age, the forests of Hanöbukten Bay and the rich wetlands of the River Helge. The Kristianstad Vattenrike Biosphere Reserve is visited by about 100,000 people every year.

The hiking trail Skåneleden has a sub-trail named after Vattenrike, traversing it north to south and passing through the town of Kristianstad. Other smaller trails also pass through the reserve, such as Linnérundan, with 6 kilometres (3.7 mi), partly overlapping with Skåneleden, and the smaller Tivolirundan, with 1.8 kilometres (1.1 mi).

Naturum Vattenriket was inaugurated on 27 November 2010 and includes exhibitions, a meeting hall, a restaurant, and various program activities. The center provides information about the biosphere reserve work, the nature of the biosphere area, and different activities. Naturum receives approximately 100,000 visitors annually.

The building had a construction budget of 90 million SEK. It was nominated for the World Architecture Festival in 2011.
