= Näsum =

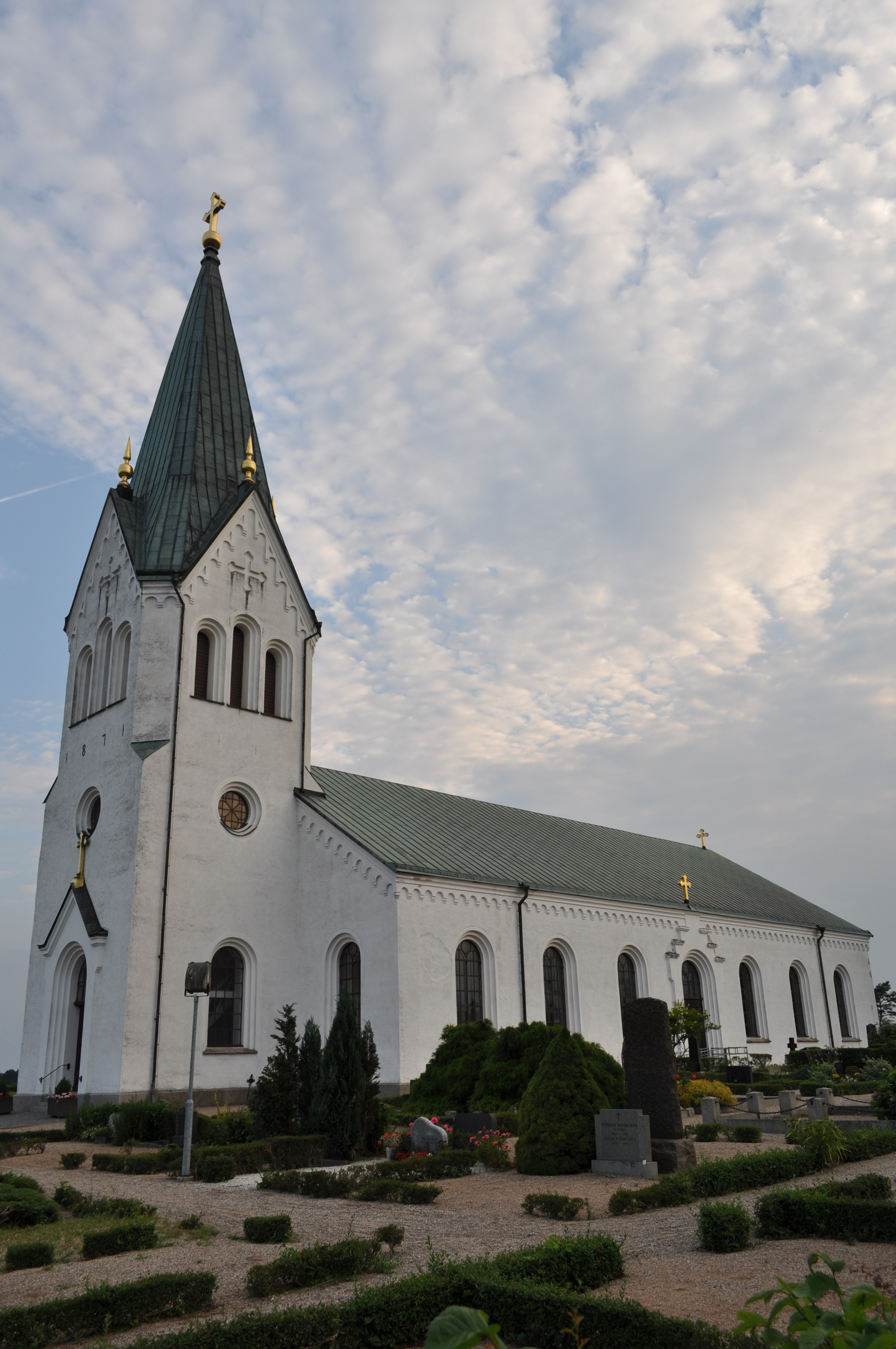
- Näsum Church

- Location within Skåne Location within Sweden
- Coordinates: 56°10′N 14°29′E
- Country: Sweden
- Province: Skåne
- County: Skåne County
- Municipality: Bromölla Municipality

Area
  - Total: 1.20 km^{2} (0.46 sq mi)

Population (31 December 2010)
  - Total: 1,117
  - Density: 934/km^{2} (2,420/sq mi)
- Time zone: UTC+1 (CET)
  - Summer (DST): UTC+2 (CEST)

Näsum is a locality situated in Bromölla Municipality, Skåne County, Sweden with 1,117 inhabitants in 2010.

The village and its surrounding landscape, including the nature reserve Näsums bokskogar are a part of the hiking trail Skåneleden.
