= Forsakar Nature Reserve =

Nature reserve in Skåne, Sweden

Coordinates: 55°49′34″N 14°4′56″E

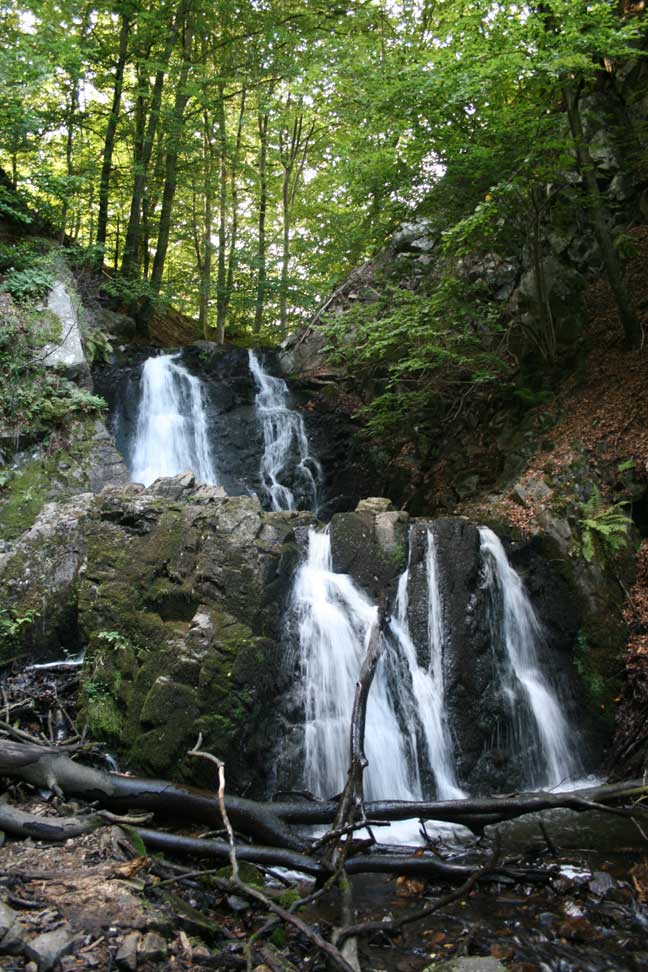
The Forsakar Waterfalls

The Forsakar Nature Reserve (Swedish: Naturreservatet Forsakar [fɔʂaˈkɑːr]) is situated in the north-eastern part of the Skåne province of Sweden, in the Kristianstad municipality near the village of Degeberga. The 2.5 hectare large nature reserve was founded 1928 and mainly encompasses a 750 metres (2,460 ft) long and 40 metres (130 ft) deep ravine. The ravine runs from west to east and is likely a product of erosion during some of the ice ages.

The Forsakar Creek (Swedish: Forsakarbäcken) runs through the nature reserve and passes the Forsakar Waterfalls (Swedish: Forsakar Vattenfall), the upper fall having a free fall of 7.4 metres (24 ft) and the lower fall having a free fall of 10.6 metres (35 ft). The bedrock of the ravine consists of Gneiss. The nature reserve has three minor dams that were erected during the late 19th century and the early 20th century to create hydroelectricity. The dams are nowadays dismantled and inactive.

The vegetation of the Forsaker Nature Reserve is dominated by beech forest. Longside the creek is a more humid forest vegetation including alder, ash, elm and hornbeam. Characteristic resident birds of the nature reserve are amongst others the white-throated dipper, grey wagtail and the Eurasian wren. Common birds of the beech forest are the wood warbler, hawfinch, tawny owl and the lesser spotted woodpecker. Amongst mammals in the nature reserve the mink and pine marten are common. When it comes to insects some rarely seen species have been reported such as rove beetles, carrion beetles, the Agathomyia wankowiczi fly and the endangered Carabus intricatus beetle.

The nature reserve is traversed by a section of the hiking trail Skåneleden, formerly known as Degebergaleden.
