= Immeln =

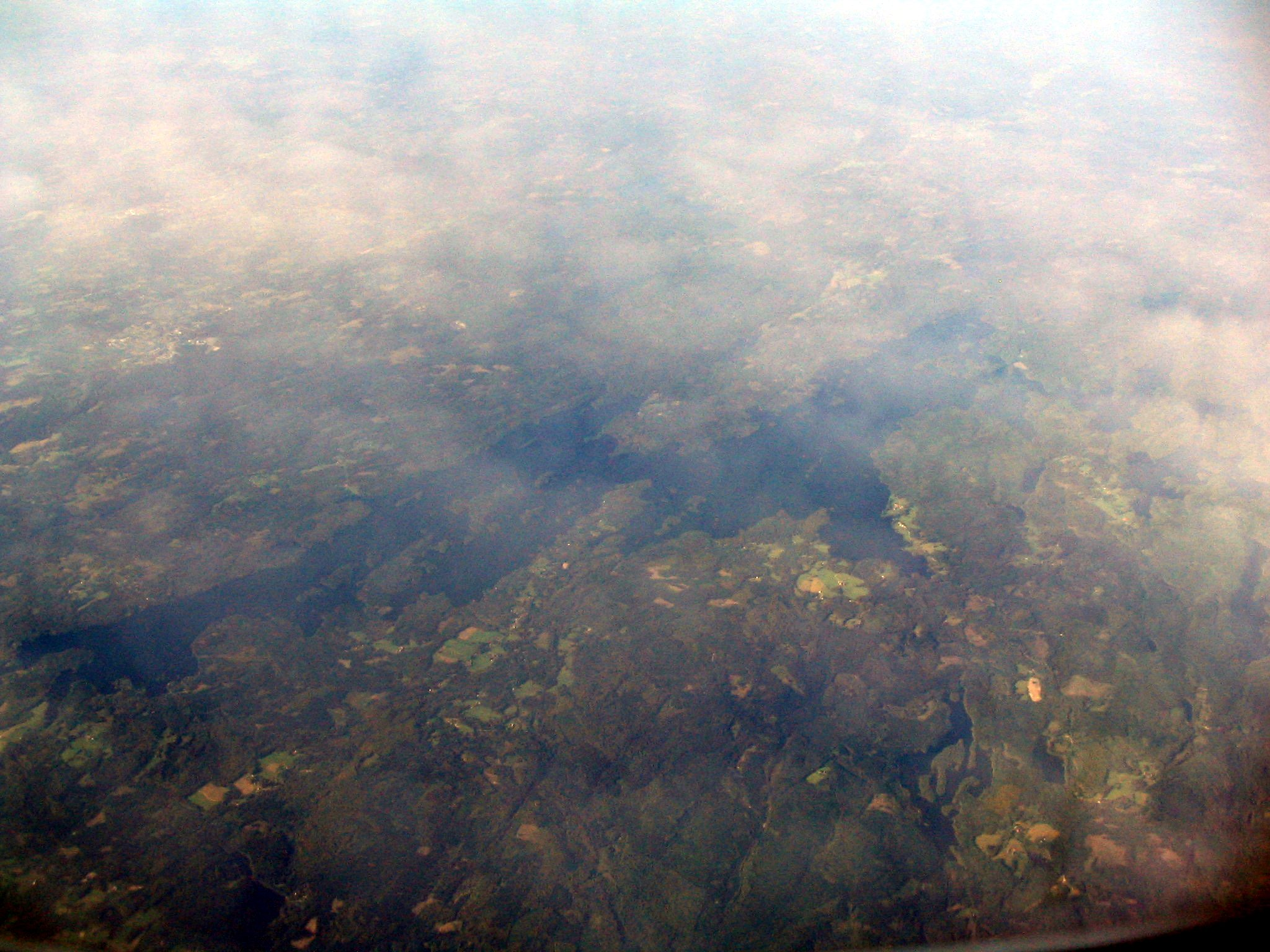
- Aerial photograph of Lake Immeln

- Location within Scania Location within Sweden Location within European Union
- Coordinates: 56°12′N 14°15′E
- Country: Sweden
- Province: Scania
- County: Scania County
- Municipality: Östra Göinge Municipality

Area
  - Total: 0.58 km^{2} (0.22 sq mi)

Population (31 December 2010)
  - Total: 278
  - Density: 482/km^{2} (1,250/sq mi)
- Time zone: UTC+1 (CET)
  - Summer (DST): UTC+2 (CEST)

Immeln (Swedish pronunciation: [ˈɪ̂mːɛln]) is a locality situated in Östra Göinge Municipality, Scania County, Sweden with 278 inhabitants in 2010.

== Climate ==
Immeln is a Swedish district located in Skane, with warm climate in the summer season. Its annual warmth caps at an average of 10.4 °C (50.72 °F). Immeln's warmth is estimated to be 3.15% above average warmth in Sweden. Liquified frozen water descends on Immeln for up to 96.99 millimeters or 3.82 inches. Rains visit the location for 189.63 days per year.

== Similar Places ==
Also located in Skane, Dalby shares similar statistics of temperature and rainfall with Immeln. Warmth caps at an annual average of 50.76 °F, descent of liquified frozen water is estimated at 97.22 millimeters and rains fall for 190 days every year. Sodra Sandby is just 6km (5.79km exactly) away from Dalby.
