= Bulltofta =

Neighbourhood in Malmö, Sweden

- Neighbourhood
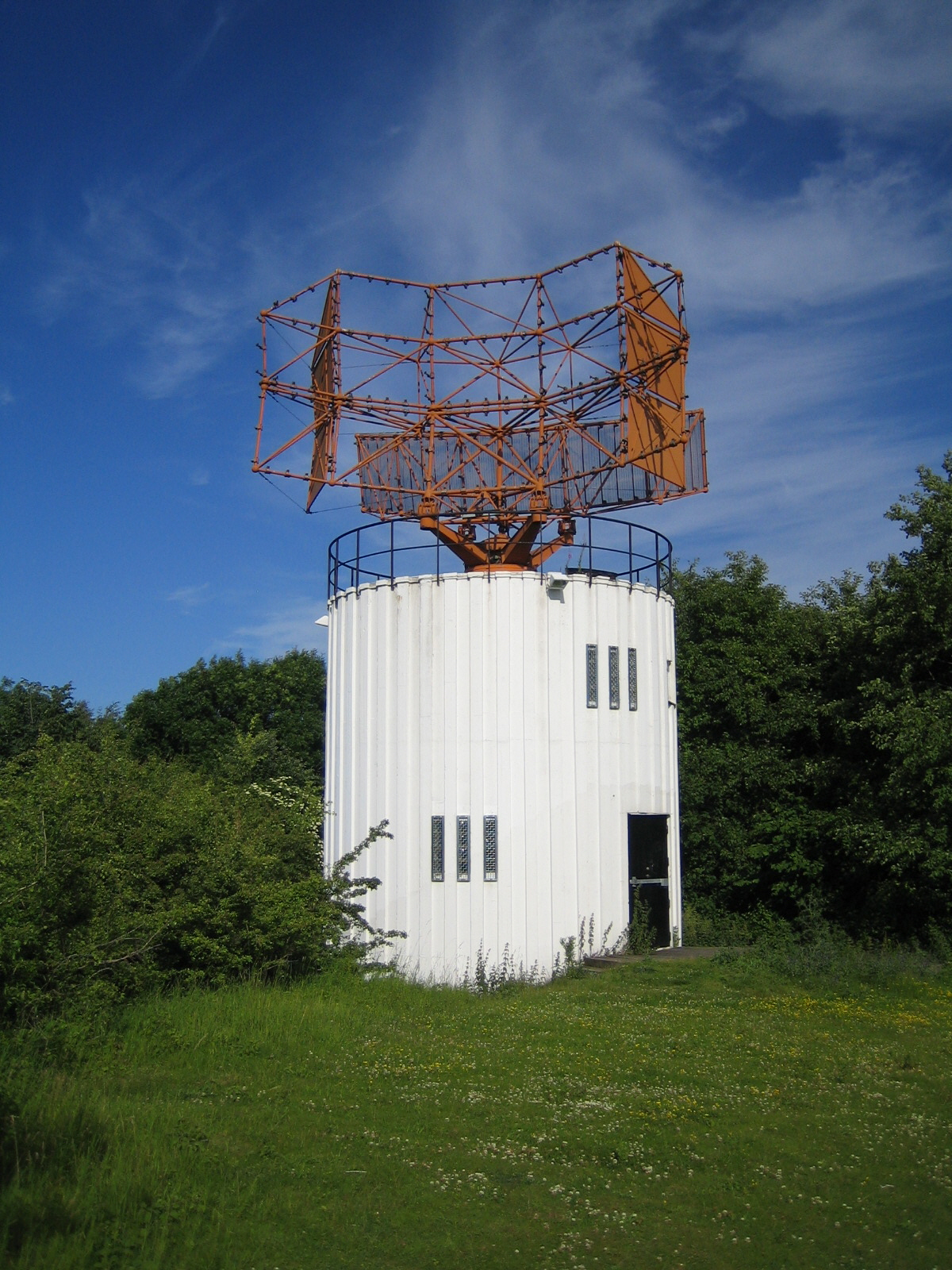
- Interactive map of Bulltofta
- Coordinates: 55°36′18″N 13°03′35″E
- Country: Sweden
- Province: Skåne
- County: Skåne County
- Municipality: Malmö Municipality
- Borough of Malmö: Kirseberg

Population (1 January 2011)
  - Total: 1,142
- Time zone: UTC+1 (CET)
  - Summer (DST): UTC+2 (CEST)

Bulltofta is a neighbourhood of Malmö, Sweden. It contains the defunct Malmö Bulltofta Airport.
