= Fru Alstad Church =

- Fru Alstads kyrka
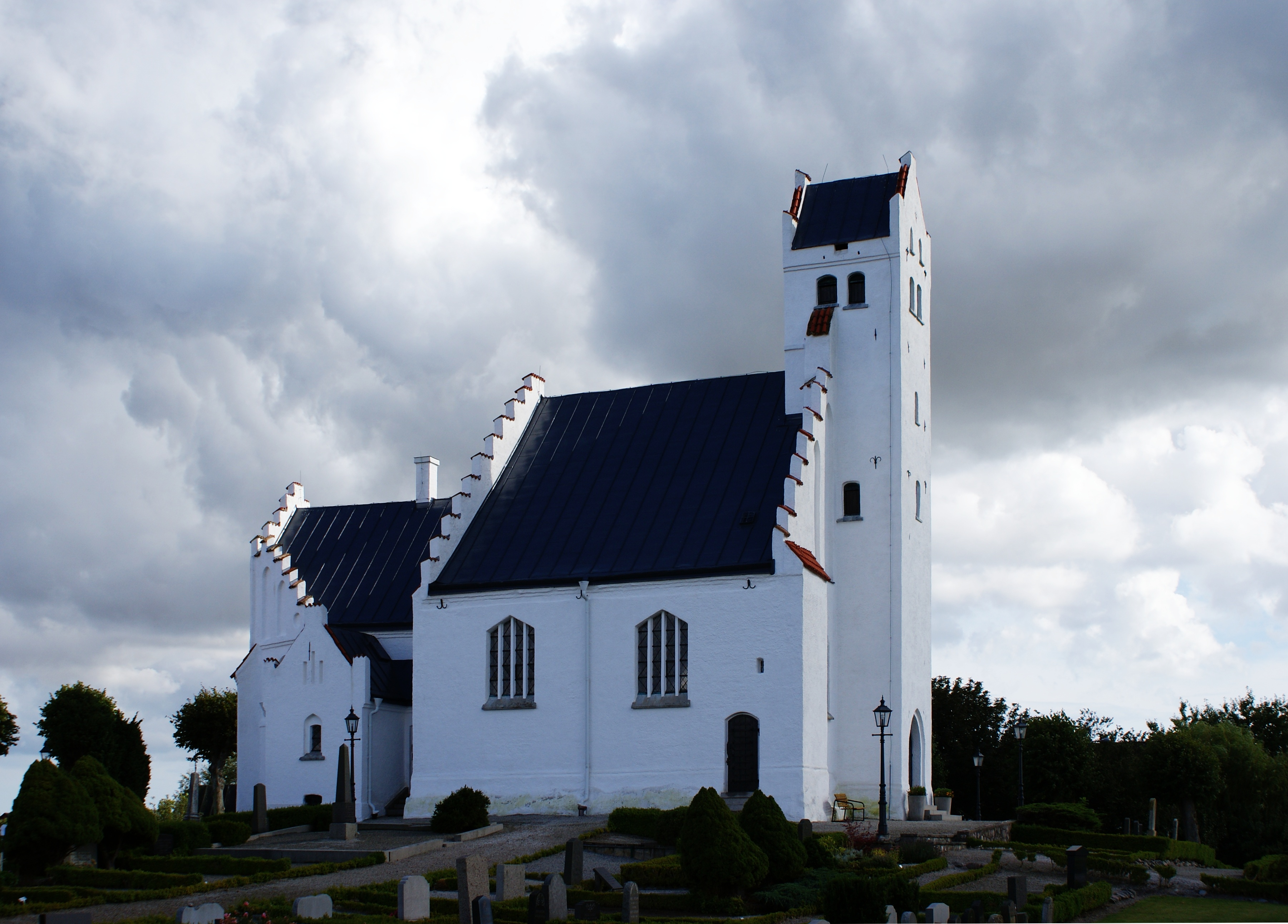
- Fru Alstad Church

- Location within Skåne Location within Sweden
- 55°26′40″N 13°14′44″E
- Country: Sweden
- Denomination: Church of Sweden

Administration
- Diocese: Lund

Fru Alstad Church (Swedish: Fru Alstads kyrka) is a medieval Lutheran church in the province of Scania, Sweden. It belongs to the Diocese of Lund. It was built during the 15th century and was a local pilgrimage site during the Middle Ages.

== History and architecture ==
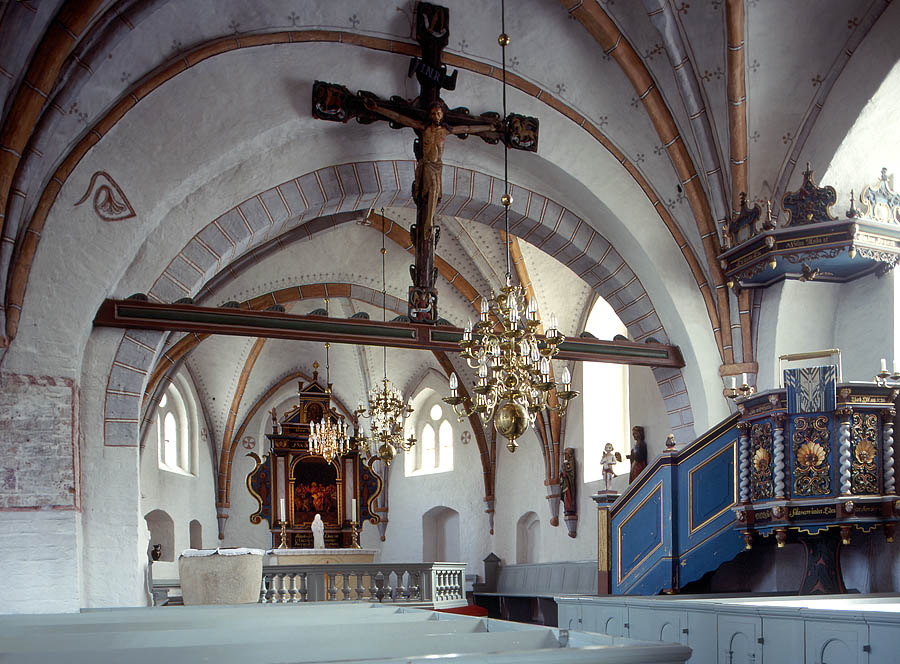
Interior view towards the choir

Fru Alstad Church dates in its entirety from the 15th century, but the remains of an older church have been found during examinations of the presently visible church. This earlier church was probably Romanesque in style, as opposed to the pronounced Gothic style of the presently visible church. The church lies on a hill and dominates the landscape around it. It lies in a small hamlet, and to the west of the church lies a small spring, which was considered holy during the Middle Ages. It became a locally popular pilgrimage site especially during the late Middle Ages; it is however possible that the tradition of the sacred spring goes back to pre-Christian times. The name refers to Mary, as Our Lady in Swedish translates to Vår Fru.

The church also historically served a defensive purpose. In the churchyard, the remains of what is assumed to have been a defensive wall have been discovered, and as late as 1861 an earth rampart surrounded the church. Some of the doors of the church are still marked by bullet holes dating from the wars between Denmark and Sweden in the 17th century.

The choir is the oldest part of the now visible church, probably dating from the first half of the 15th century but possibly containing elements which are older. The nave dates from the second half of the same century. The ceiling is supported by star-shaped vaults which are in turn supported by an octagonal pillar in the middle of the room. The pillar carries several inscriptions and markings (house marks) by pilgrims from the Middle Ages. Partially embedded in the western wall is a slender bell tower. The church is internally partially decorated with murals dating from the 15th century, and has a baptismal font dating from the 12th century. In the choir stand two late medieval wooden sculptures, depicting John the Evangelist and Saint Peter. The church also has a triumphal cross dating from the 15th century, which was reinstalled in the church during a renovation in 1906–7. The pulpit dates from the 1730s and the altarpiece from 1689.

In 2005, the church underwent an internal renovation.
