= Nybrostrand =

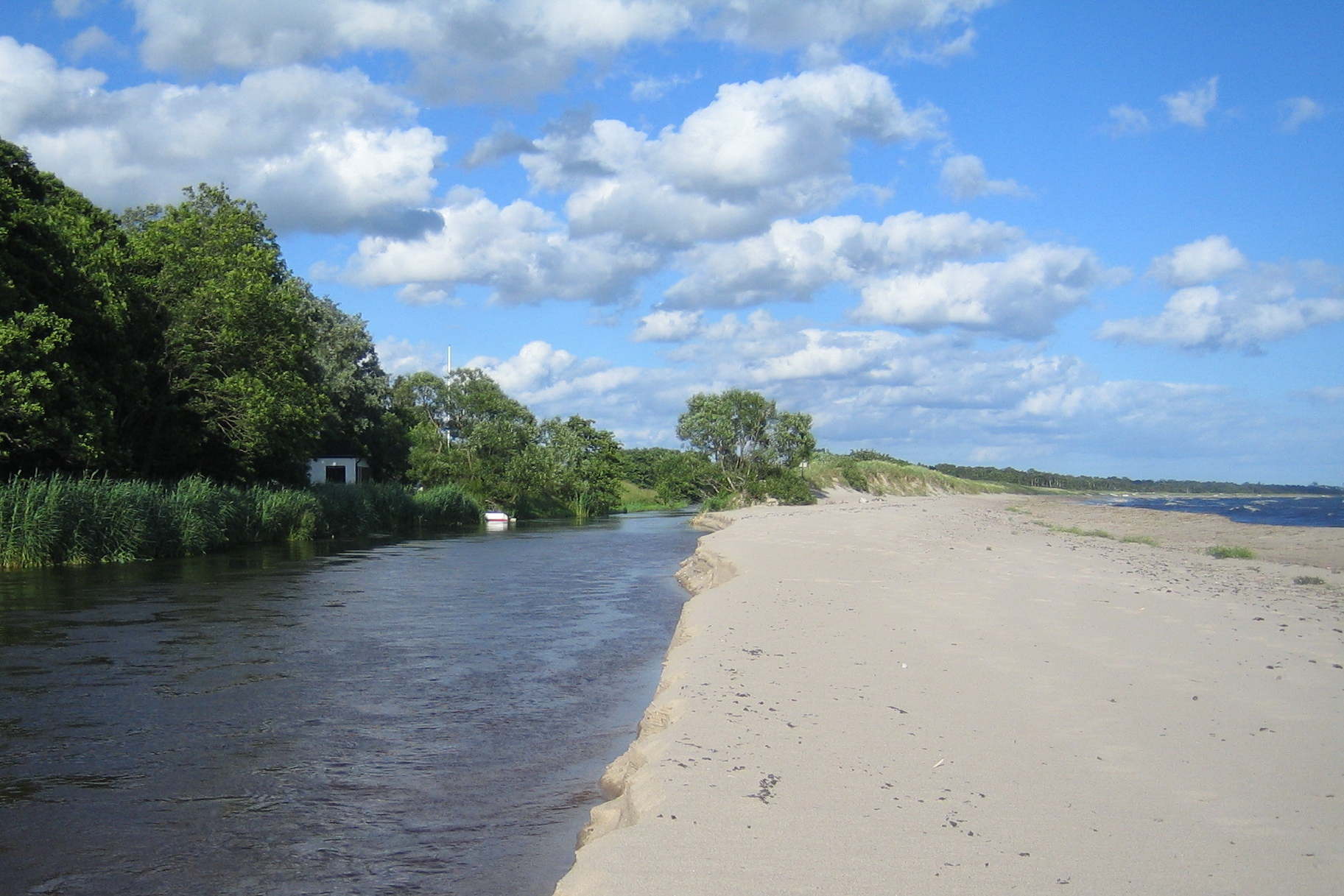
- Nybroån

- Location within Skåne Location within Sweden
- Coordinates: 55°26′N 13°56′E
- Country: Sweden
- Province: Skåne
- County: Skåne County
- Municipality: Ystad Municipality

Area
  - Total: 0.83 km^{2} (0.32 sq mi)

Population (31 December 2010)
  - Total: 810
  - Density: 973/km^{2} (2,520/sq mi)
- Time zone: UTC+1 (CET)
  - Summer (DST): UTC+2 (CEST)

Nybrostrand is a locality situated in Ystad Municipality, Skåne County, Sweden with 810 inhabitants in 2010.
