= Österslöv =

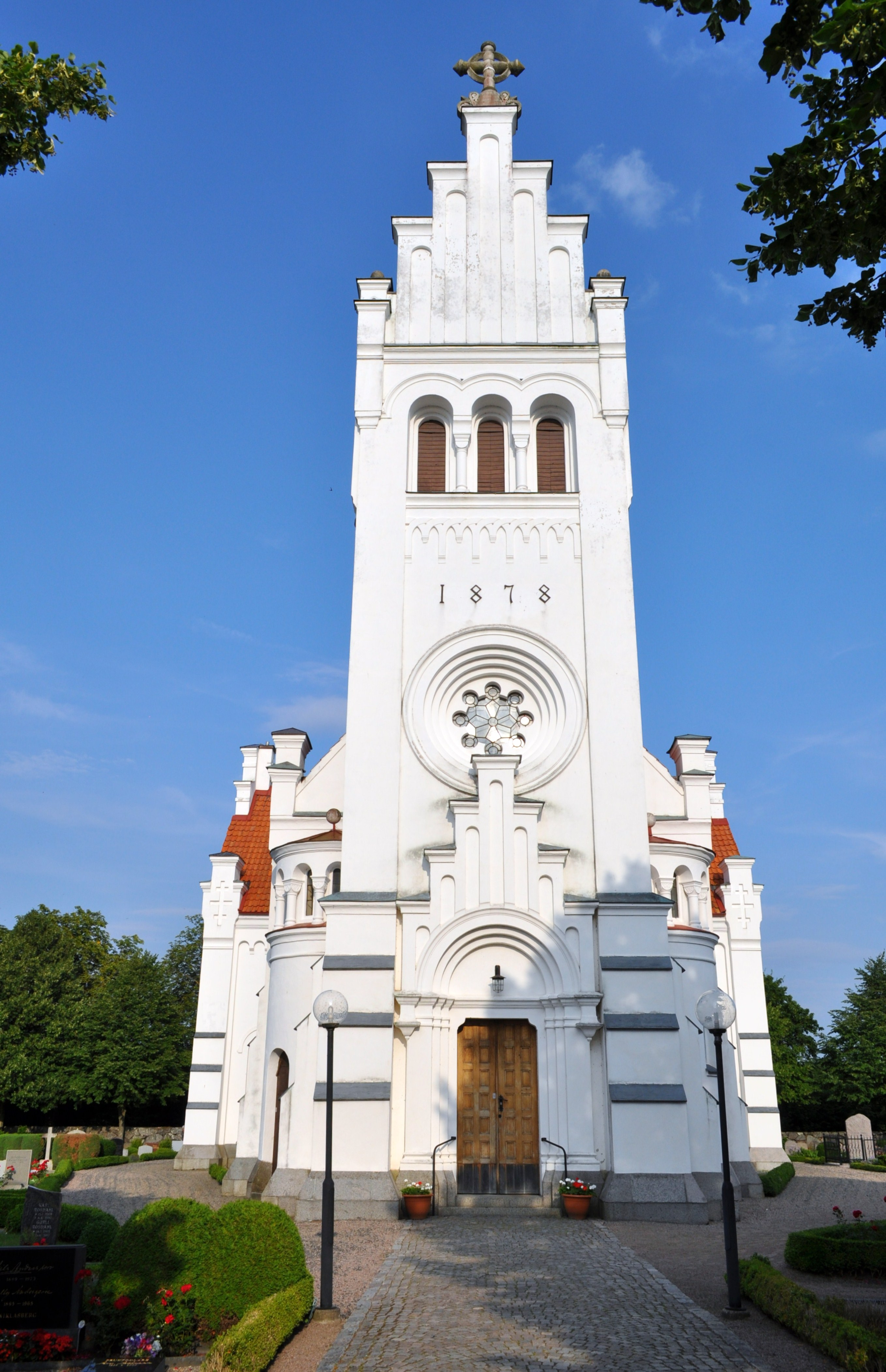
- Church

- Location within Skåne Location within Sweden
- Coordinates: 56°06′N 14°15′E
- Country: Sweden
- Province: Skåne
- County: Skåne County
- Municipality: Kristianstad Municipality

Area
  - Total: 0.51 km^{2} (0.20 sq mi)

Population (31 December 2010)
  - Total: 414
  - Density: 817/km^{2} (2,120/sq mi)
- Time zone: UTC+1 (CET)
  - Summer (DST): UTC+2 (CEST)

Österslöv is a locality situated in Kristianstad Municipality, Skåne County, Sweden with 414 inhabitants in 2010.
