= Häckeberga Castle =

Mansion at Lund Municipality in Scania, Sweden

- Häckeberga slott
- Lund Municipality
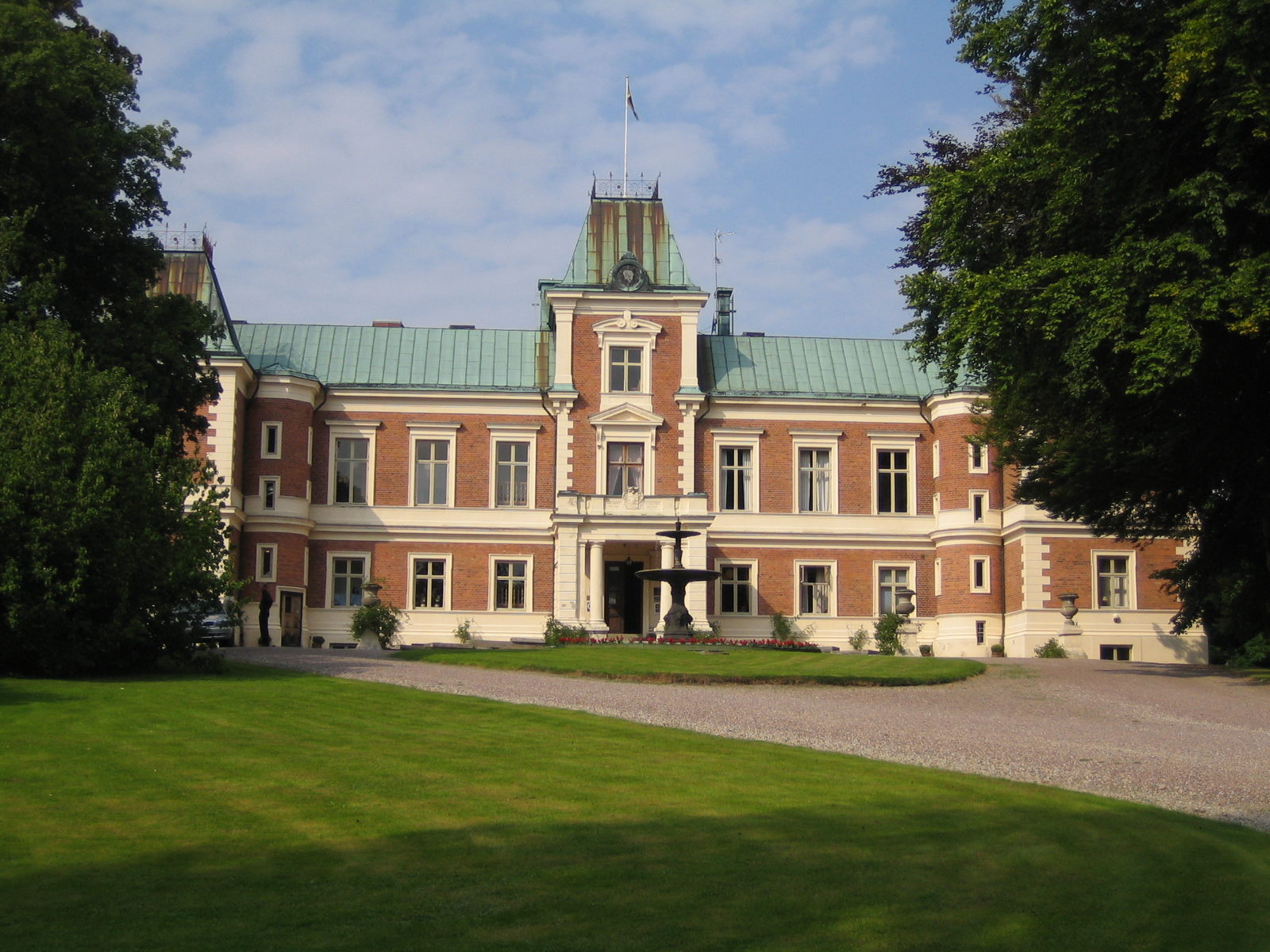
- Häckeberga Castle

Site information
- Type: Castle
- Open to the public: Yes

Location
- Scania, Sweden
- Location within Skåne
- Coordinates: 55°34′49″N 13°25′42″E

Site history
- Built: 1875

Häckeberga Castle (Swedish: Häckeberga slott) is a mansion at Lund Municipality in Scania, Sweden. The estate dates back to the 14th century and is located on one of the seven islets of Lake Häckebergasjön. The manor house was built in French Renaissance style between 1873 and 1875 by Tönnes Wrangel von Brehmer after drawings by Helgo Zettervall (1831-1907). It currently (2022) hosts a boutique hotel, restaurant with former Michelin star chef and conference facility.

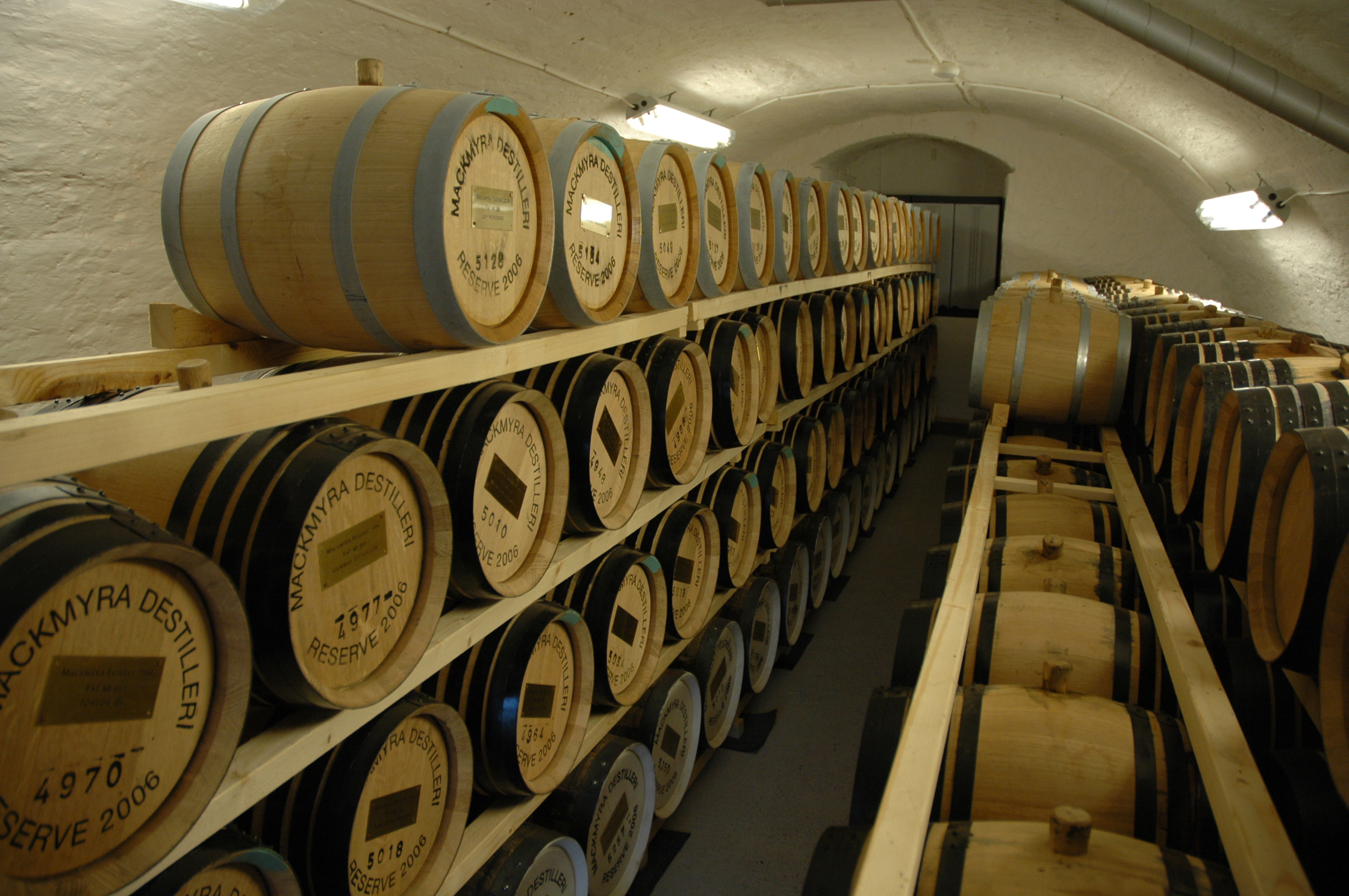
Mackmyra Whisky had one of its warehouses in Hackeberga Castle

== See also ==
- List of castles in Sweden
