= Rydebäck =

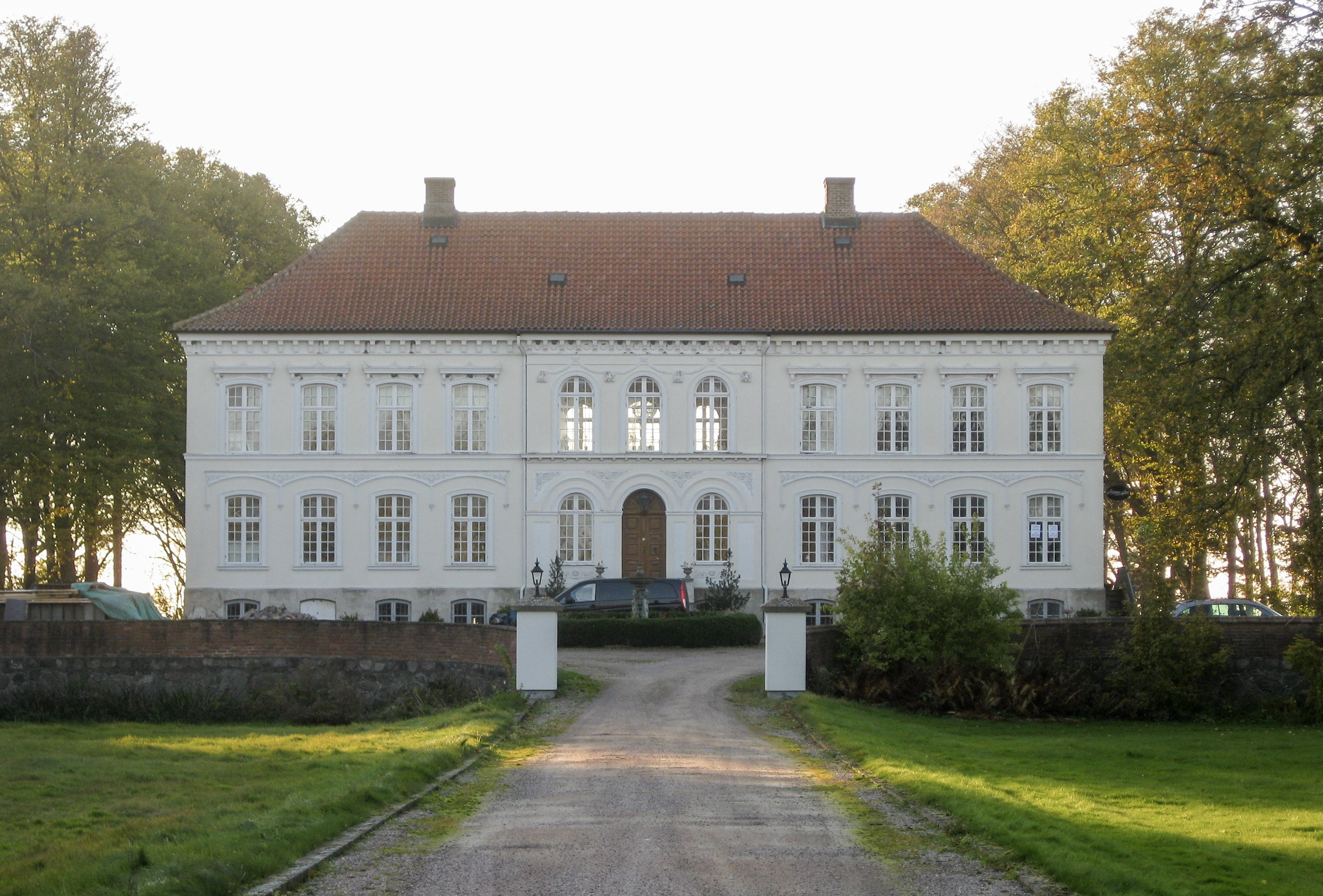
- Rydebäcks farm

- Location within Skåne Location within Sweden
- Coordinates: 55°58′N 12°46′E
- Country: Sweden
- Province: Skåne
- County: Scania
- Municipality: Helsingborg Municipality and Landskrona Municipality

Area
  - Total: 2.08 km^{2} (0.80 sq mi)

Population (31 December 2020)
  - Total: 6,480
  - Density: 2,466/km^{2} (6,390/sq mi)
- Time zone: UTC+1 (CET)
  - Summer (DST): UTC+2 (CEST)

Rydebäck is a bimunicipal locality situated in Helsingborg Municipality and Landskrona Municipality in Scania, Sweden with 6,480 inhabitants in 2020.
