= Snogeholm Castle =

Castle in Sjöbo Municipality, Scania, Sweden

- Snogeholms slott
- Sjöbo Municipality
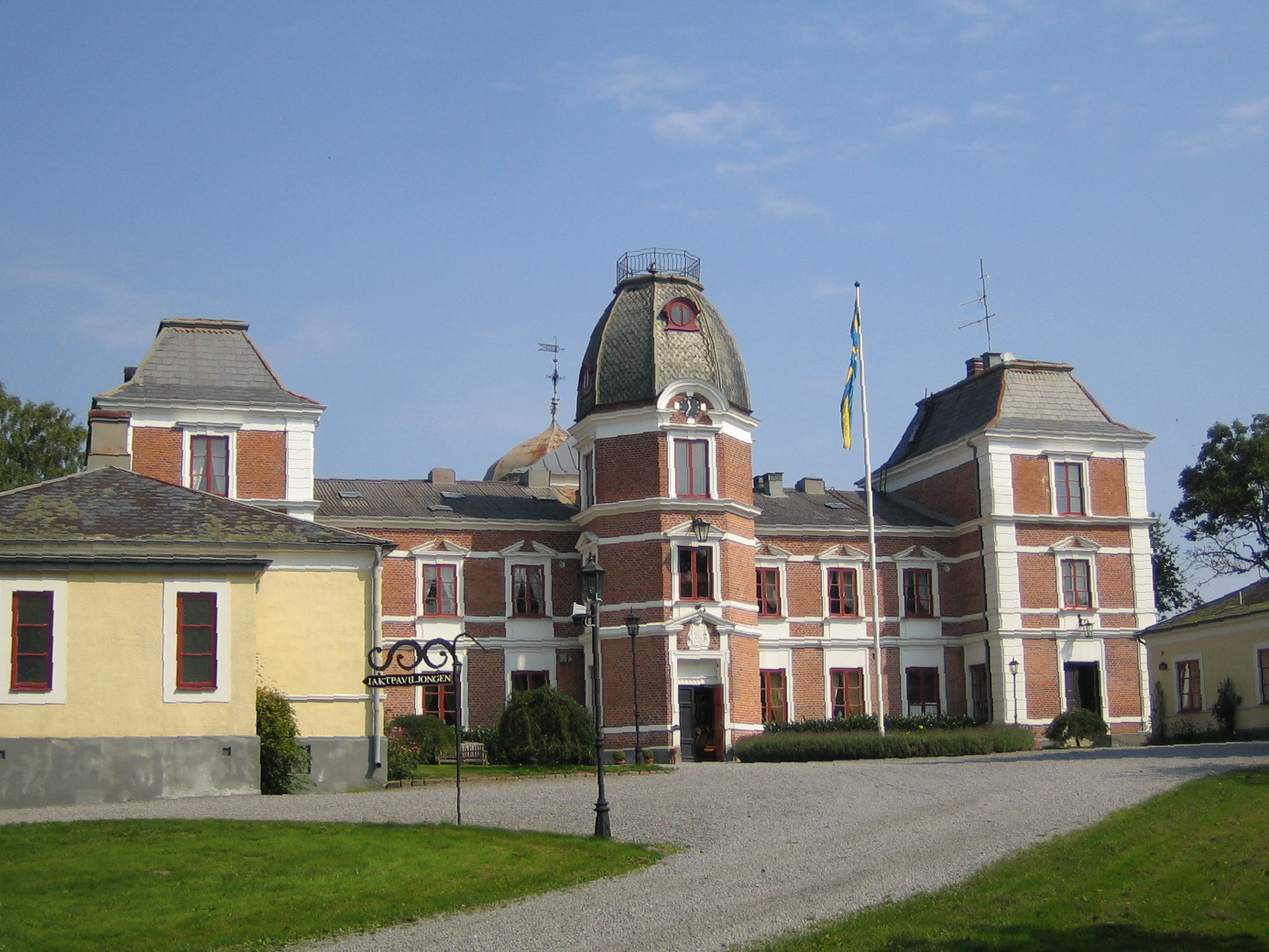
- Snogeholm Castle

Site information
- Type: Castle
- Open to the public: Yes

Location
- Scania, Sweden
- Coordinates: 55.5606°N 13.7128°E

Site history
- Built: 1870s

Snogeholm Castle (Swedish: Snogeholms slott) is a castle in Sjöbo Municipality, Scania, in southern Sweden.

Snogeholm Castle lies on the eastern shore of Snogeholmssjön (Lake Snogeholm). In the middle ages there was a fortress on an island in Snogeholmssjön, Hejreholm. The fortress was attached to the Archbishop in Lund. A connection to the knight Holger Gregersen Krognosis mentioned in 1355. At the Reformation, in 1536, the castle was transferred to the Danish crown because it was destroyed by fire, and was therefore not rebuilt. Later, around 1690, the castle was rebuilt on the edge of the lake where it still is. In 1899 and 1902 the German emperor Wilhelm II spent time there, hunting deer. The current castle was built in the 1870s. It has a style reminiscent of French Baroque with a two-story main building, three towers, all three-storied, as well as two detached single-story wings.

== See also ==
- List of castles in Sweden
