= Sibbhult =

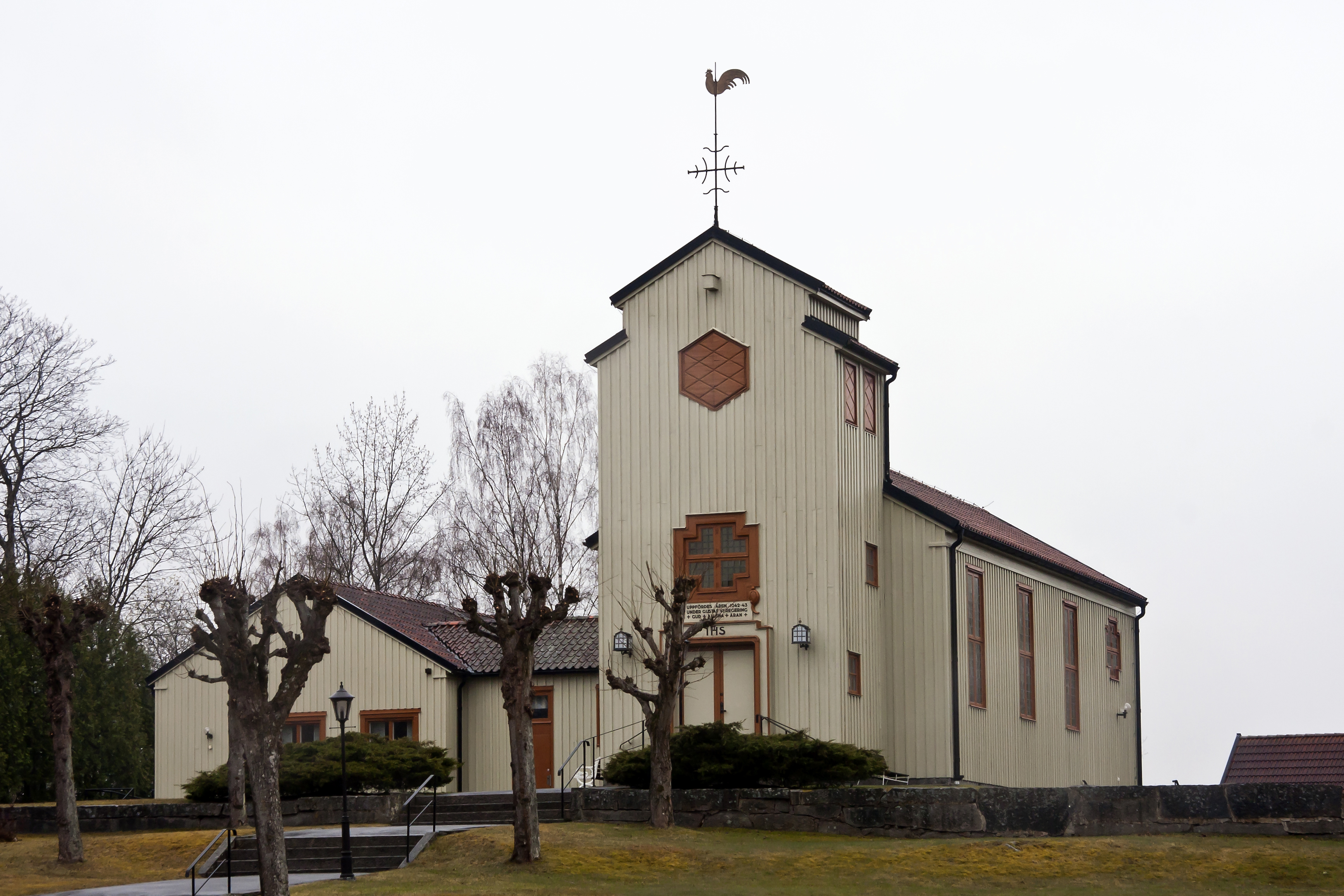
- Sibbhult Church

- Location within Scania Location within Sweden Location within European Union
- Coordinates: 56°16′N 14°12′E
- Country: Sweden
- Province: Scania
- County: Scania County
- Municipality: Östra Göinge Municipality

Area
  - Total: 1.47 km^{2} (0.57 sq mi)

Population (31 December 2010)
  - Total: 1,364
  - Density: 926/km^{2} (2,400/sq mi)
- Time zone: UTC+1 (CET)
  - Summer (DST): UTC+2 (CEST)

Sibbhult is a locality situated in Östra Göinge Municipality, Scania County, Sweden with 1,364 inhabitants in 2010.
