= Utvälinge =

- Location within Skåne Location within Sweden
- Coordinates: 56°13′N 12°47′E
- Country: Sweden
- Province: Skåne
- County: Skåne County
- Municipality: Helsingborg Municipality

Area
  - Total: 0.24 km^{2} (0.093 sq mi)

Population (2010-12-31)
  - Total: 227
  - Density: 928/km^{2} (2,400/sq mi)
- Time zone: UTC+1 (CET)
  - Summer (DST): UTC+2 (CEST)

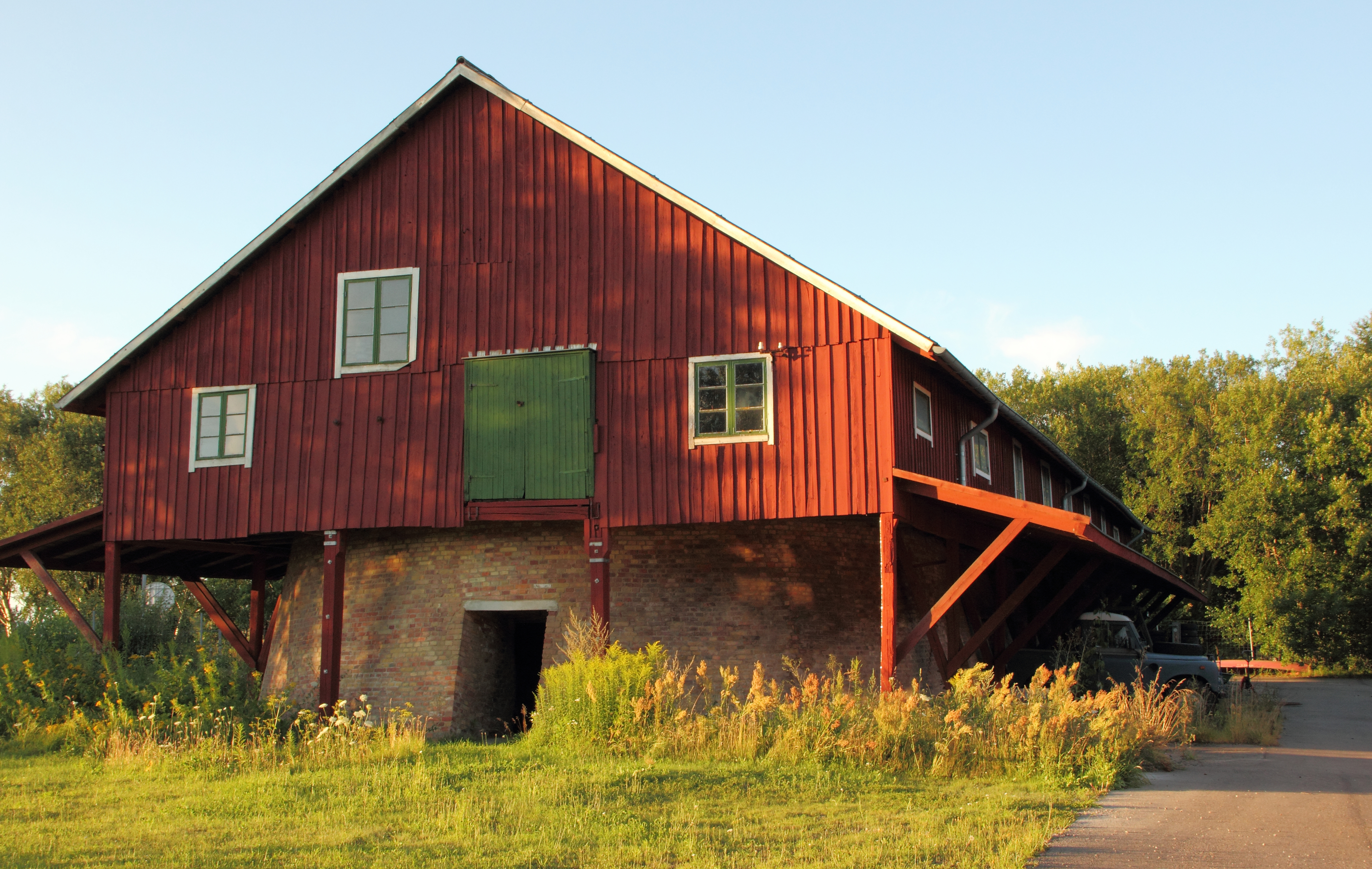
The old brickyard in Utvälinge, Sweden

Utvälinge is a locality situated in Helsingborg Municipality, Skåne County, Sweden with 227 inhabitants in 2010. It has an area of 0.24 square kilometres (24 hectares; 59 acres).
