= List of castles and palaces in Sweden =

This is a list of castles and palaces in Sweden. In the Swedish language the word "slott" is used for castles, châteaux and palaces; this article lists all of those, and also fortresses.

== A–B ==
Name	Swedish name	Location	Date	Condition	Picture	Notes
Almnäs Castle	Almnäs slott	Västergötland	1776	Private residence		
Alnarp Castle	Alnarp slott	Scania	1862	Private residence		
Alsnö Castle	Alsnö hus	Uppland	c. 1200	Ruin		
Bäckaskog Castle	Bäckaskogs slott	Scania	13th century	Museum		
Barsebäck Castle	Barsebäcks slott	Scania	14th century	Private residence		
Bellinga Castle	Bellinga slott	Scania	16th century	Private residence		
Bergkvara	Bergkvara slott	Småland	15th century	Ruin		
Bjärka-Säby Castle	Nya slottet Bjärka-Säby	Östergötland	1791	Museum		
Bjärsjöholm Castle	Bjärsjöholms slott	Scania	14th century	Private residence		
Bjärsjölagård Castle	Bjärsjölagårds slott	Scania	1766	Hotel		
Björksund Castle	Björksunds slott	Södermanland	18th century	Private residence		
Björnstorp Castle	Björnstorps slott	Scania	1752	Private residence		
Blekhem	Blekhem	Småland	1838	Private residence		
Bollerup	Bollerups borg	Scania	15th century	School		
Boo Castle	Boo slott	Närke	1882	Private residence		
Bogesund Castle	Bogesunds slott	Uppland	16th century	Museum		
Bohus Fortress	Bohus fästning	Bohuslän	1308	Ruin		
Borgeby Castle	Borgeby slott	Scania	15th century	Museum		
Borgholm Castle	Borgholms slott	Öland	13th century	Ruin		
Börringe Priory	Börringeklosters slott	Scania	13th century	Private residence		
Bosjökloster	Bosjöklosters slott	Scania	1080	Museum		
Bråborg Castle	Bråborgs slott	Östergötland	1590	Ruin		
Brahehus	Brahehus	Småland	1637	Ruin		
Brokind Castle	Brokinds slott	Östergötland	1731	Private residence		

== C–E ==
Name	Swedish name	Location	Date	Condition	Picture	Notes
Carlsten Fortress	Carlstens fästning	Bohuslän	1667	Museum		
Charlottenborg manor house	Charlottenborgs slott	Östergötland	1651	Museum		
Charlottenlund Castle	Charlottenlunds slott	Scania	1849	Private residence		
Chinese Pavilion at Drottningholm	Kina slott	Stockholm	1769	Museum		One of the royal palaces of Sweden
Christinehof Castle	Christinehofs slott	Scania	1740	Museum		
Claestorp Castle	Claestorps slott	Södermanland	1754	Hotel		
Dalaborg	Dalaborg	Dalsland	1304	Ruin		
Dagsnäs Castle	Dagsnäs slott	Västergötland	1874	Private residence		
Djursholm Castle	Djursholms slott	Stockholm	15th century	Office		
Drottningholm Palace	Drottningholms slott	Stockholm	1580	Private residence, museum		World Heritage by UNESCO
Dybäck Castle	Dybäcks slott	Scania	14th century	Private residence		
Edsberg Castle	Edsbergs slott	Uppland	1630	School		
Ekenäs Castle	Ekenäs slott	Östergötland	15th century	Museum		
Ekebyholm Castle	Ekebyholms slott	Uppland	17th century	School		
Ekebyhov Castle	Ekebyhovs slott	Uppland	1670s	Museum		
Ekensholm Castle	Ekensholms slott	Södermanland	1820s	Private residence		
Eketorp Fort	Eketorps fornborg	Öland	5th century	Museum, ruin		
Ekholmen Castle	Ekholmens slott	Uppland	1857	Hotel		
Ekolsund Castle	Ekolsunds slott	Uppland	17th century	Hotel		
Elghammar Castle	Elghammars slott	Södermanland	1807	Private residence		
Ellinge Castle	Ellinge slott	Scania	15th century	Restaurant		
Ericsberg Castle	Ericsbergs slott	Södermanland	16th century	Private residence		
Erstavik	Erstavik	Stockholm	1760s	Private residence		

== F–H ==
Name	Swedish name	Location	Date	Condition	Picture	Notes
Fiholm Castle	Fiholms slott	Södermanland	1642	Private residence		
Fjällnäs Castle	Fjällnäs slott	Lapland	1888	Hotel		
Finspång Castle	Finspångs slott	Östergötland	1685	Office		
Fullerö Castle	Fullerö slott	Västmanland	17th century	Private residence		
Gåsevadholm Castle	Gåsevadholms slott	Halland	1757	Office		
Gärsnäs Castle	Gärsnäs slott	Scania	1873	Private residence		
Gävle Castle	Gävle slott	Gästrikland	1754	County Governor's; Official Residence		
Glimmingehus	-	Scania	1499	Museum		
Göksholm Castle	Göksholms slott	Närke	13th century	Private residence		
Gripsholm Castle	Gripsholms slott	Södermanland	1537	Museum		One of the royal palaces of Sweden
Gråborg Fort	Gråborg fornborg	Öland	6th century	Ruin		
Granhammar Castle	Granhammars slott	Uppland	1752	No function		
Gränsö Castle	Gränsö slott	Småland	1807	Hotel		
Gripenberg Castle	Gripenbergs slott	Småland	1660s	Private residence		
Grönsö Castle	Grönsöö slott	Uppland	1611	Museum		
Görvälns Castle	Görvälns slott	Uppland	1460	Hotel		
Gunnebo House	Gunnebo slott	Gothenburg	1796	Museum		
Gustav III's Pavilion	Gustav III:s paviljon	Stockholm	1787	Museum		One of the royal palaces of Sweden
Gyllebo Castle	Gyllebo slott	Scania	1818	Private residence		
Häckeberga Castle	Häckeberga slott	Scania	1875	Hotel		
Haddebo Manor House	Haddebo Herrgård	Närke	Early 18th century	Private Residence		
Haga Castle	Haga slott	Uppland	1670	Hotel		
Haga Palace	Haga slott	Stockholm	1805	Private residence		One of the royal palaces of Sweden
Halmstad Castle	Halmstads slott	Halland	1609	Private residence, office		
Hanaskog Castle	Hanaskogss slott	Scania	1854	Private residence		
Häringe Castle	Häringe slott	Södermanland	1654	Hotel		
Hässelby Castle	Hässelby slott	Stockholm	1640s	Hotel		
Hässelbyholm Castle	Hässelbyholms slott	Södermanland	1660s	Private residence		
Heby Castle	Heby slott	Södermanland	1780	Private residence		
Helliden Castle	Hellidens slott	Västergötland	1858	School		
Herrevad Abbey	Herrevadskloster	Scania	1745	Hotel		
Hjularöd Castle	Hjularöds slott	Scania	1897	Private residence		
Högestad Castle	Högestads gods	Scania	16th century	Private residence		
Hörningsholm Castle	Hörningsholms slott	Södermanland	13th century	Private residence		
Hovdala Castle	Hovdala slott	Scania	12th century	Museum		

== I–L ==
Name	Swedish name	Location	Date	Condition	Picture	Notes
Ismantorp Fortress	Ismantorps fornborg	Öland	2nd century	Ruin		
Johannisborg	Johannisborg	Östergötland	1614	Ruin		
Johannishus Castle	Johannishus slott	Blekinge	1670	Private residence		
Jordberga Castle	Jordberga slott	Scania	1908	Private residence		
Kalmar Castle	Kalmar slott	Småland	12th century	Museum		
Karlberg Palace	Karlbergs slott	Stockholm	1634	School		
Karlsborg Fortress	Karlsborgs fästning	Västergötland	1819	Museum		
Kärnan	Kärnan	Scania	11th century	Museum		
Karsholm Castle	Karsholms slott	Scania	1862	Private residence		
Katthamra Mansion	Katthamra gård	Gotland	1805	Private residence		
Kavlås Castle	Kavlås slott	Västergötland	1775	Private residence		
Knutstorp Castle	Knutstorps borg	Scania	14th century	Private residence		
Koberg Castle	Koberg slott	Västergötland	1632	Private residence		
Krageholm Castle	Krageholms slott	Scania	1720s	Private residence		
Krapperup Castle	Krapperups slott	Scania	14th century	Private residence		
Kristineberg Palace	Kristinebergs slott	Stockholm	1750	Private residence		
Kronoberg Castle	Kronobergs slott	Småland	1444	Ruin		
Kronovall Castle	Kronovalls slott	Scania	1760	Private residence		
Kulla Gunnarstorp Castle	Kulla Gunnarstorps slott	Scania	1854	Private residence		
Kåseholm Manor	Kåseholms slott	Scania	1639	Hotel and conference hall		
Läckö Castle	Läckö slott	Västergötland	1298	Museum		
Landskrona Citadel	Citadellet (Landskrona slott)	Scania	1559	Museum		
Leufsta	Lövstabruk	Uppland	1601	Museum		
Lillienhoff Palace	Lillienhoffska palatset	Stockholm	1670	Restaurant, offices, apartments		
Lindholmen Castle	Lindholmens slott	Scania	13th century	Ruin		
Lindholmen Castle	Lindholmens slott	Västergötland	1514	Ruin		
Linköping Castle	Linköpings slott	Östergötland	12th century	Museum		
Ljung Castle	Ljungs slott	Östergötland	1774	Museum		
Lyckås	Lyckås	Småland	1863			
Löberöd Castle	Löberöds slott	Scania	1798	Private residence		
Lövstad Castle	Löfstads slott	Östergötland	1660	Museum		

== M–P ==
Name	Swedish name	Location	Date	Condition	Picture	Notes
Malmö Castle	Malmöhus slott	Scania	1530	Museum		
Mälsåker House	Mälsåkers slott	Södermanland	1660s	Museum		
Maltesholm Castle	Maltesholms slott	Scania	1635	Private residence		
Månstorp Gables	Månstorps slottsruin	Scania	1547	Ruin		
Mariedal Castle	Mariedals slott	Västergötland	1660s	Private residence		
Marsvinsholm Castle	Marsvinsholms slott	Scania	1648	Private residence		
Mem Castle	Mems slott	Östergötland	15th century	Private residence		
Nääs Castle	Nääs slott	Västergötland	1835	Museum		
Näs Castle	Näs slott	Småland	12th century	Ruin		
Näsby Castle	Näsby slott	Stockholm	14th century	Hotel		
Näsbyholm Castle	Näsbyholms slott	Scania	15th century	Private residence		
Noor Palace	Nors slott (traditional spelling: Noor)	Uppland	14th century	Hotel		
Nyköping Castle	Nyköpingshus	Södermanland	12th century	Ruin		
Nynäs Castle	Nynäs slott	Södermanland	1650s	Museum		
Osbyholm Castle	Osbyholms slott	Scania	1405	Private residence		
Ovesholm Castle	Ovesholms slott	Scania	1804	Private residence		
Pålsjö Castle	Pålsjö slott	Scania	1679	Private residence		
Penningby castle	Penningby slott	Uppland	1330s	Museum		

== R–S ==
Name	Swedish name	Location	Date	Condition	Picture	Notes
Råbelöv Castle	Råbelövs slott	Scania	1637	Private residence, hotel		
Rånäs Manor	Rånäs slott	Uppland	1844	Hotel		
Rinkesta Castle	Rinkesta slott	Södermanland	1775	Private residence		
Rockelstad Castle	Rockelstad slott	Södermanland	1890	Hotel		
Roma Abbey	Roma kloster	Gotland	1733	Museum		
Rönneholm Castle	Rönneholms slott	Scania	1811	Private residence		
Rosendal Castle	Rosendals slott	Scania	1615	Private residence		
Rosendal Palace	Rosendals slott	Stockholm	1827	Museum		One of the royal palaces of Sweden
Rosersberg Palace	Rosersbergs slott	Stockholm	1638	Museum		One of the royal palaces of Sweden
Rössjöholm Castle	Rössjöholms slott	Scania	1735	Private residence		
Runsa Castle	Runsa slott	Uppland	18th century	Private residence		
Rydboholm Castle	Rydboholms slott	Uppland	1548	Private residence		
Salnecke Castle	Salnecke slott	Uppland	1640	Private residence		
Salsta Castle	Salsta slott	Uppland	1675	Museum		
Sandemar Castle	Sandemar slott	Södermanland	1670	Private residence		
Säfstaholm	Säfstaholms slott	Södermanland	1815	Museum		
Sinclairsholm Castle	Sinclairsholm slott	Scania	1620	Private residence		
Sjöö Castle	Sjöö slott	Uppland	1679	Private residence		
Skabersjö Castle	Skabersjö slott	Scania	1782	Private residence		
Skånelaholm Castle	Skånelaholm slott	Uppland	1891	Museum		
Skarhult Castle	Skarhults slott	Scania	1562	Private residence		
Skokloster Castle	Skoklosters slott	Uppland	1676	Museum		
Skottorp Castle	Skottorp slott	Halland	1828	Private residence, café		
Smedstorp Castle	Smedstorps slott	Scania	14th century	Private residence		
Snogeholm Castle	Snogeholms slott	Scania	1890	Hotel		
Södertuna	Södertuna	Södermanland	1892	Restaurant		
Sofiero Castle	Sofiero slott	Scania	1865	Museum		
Solliden Palace	Solliden	Öland	1906	Private residence		
Sövdeborg Castle	Sövdeborgs slott	Scania	1844	Private residence		
Sparreholm Castle	Sparreholms slott	Södermanland	1634	Private residence, museum		
Stenhammar Palace	Stenhammars slott	Södermanland	1658	Private residence		
Steninge Palace	Steninge slott	Uppland	1705	Museum		
Stjärnorp Castle	Stjärnorp slott	Östergötland	1662	Ruin		
Stockholm Palace	Stockholms slott	Stockholm	1697	Offices of the head of state, museum		One of the royal palaces of Sweden
Stora Hästnäs	Stora Hästnäs	Gotland	c. 1300	Private residence		
Stora Sundby Castle	Stora Sundby slott	Södermanland	1848	Private residence		
Stora Wäsby Castle	Stora Wäsby slott	Uppland	18th century	Private residence		
Strömsholm Palace	Strömsholms slott	Västmanland	1669	Museum		One of the royal palaces of Sweden
Sturefors Castle	Sturefors slott	Östergötland	1704	Private residence		
Sturehov Manor	Sturehovs slott	Uppland	1780	Museum		
Sundbyholm Castle	Sundbyholms slott	Södermanland	17th century	Hotel		
Svaneholm Castle	Svaneholms slott	Scania	18th century	Museum		
Svartsjö Palace	Svartsjö slott	Uppland	1739	Museum		
Svenstorp Castle	Svenstorps slott	Scania	1596	Private residence		

== T–U ==
Name	Swedish name	Location	Date	Condition	Picture	Notes
Taxinge-Näsby Castle	Taxinge-Näsby slott	Södermanland	1813	Conference venue, restaurant		
Teleborg Castle	Teleborgs slott	Småland	1900	Conference venue		
Tidö Castle	Tidö slott	Västmanland	1645	Private residence		
Tistad Castle	Tistad slott	Södermanland	1771	Private residence		
Tjolöholm Castle	Tjolöholm slott	Halland	1904	Museum		
Toppeladugård Castle	Toppeladugårds slott	Scania	1920	Private residence		
Torpa Castle	Torpa stenhus	Västra Götaland County	15th century	Museum		
Torup Castle	Torups slott	Scania	16th century	Museum		
Tosterup Castle	Tosterups slott	Scania	15th century	Private residence		
Trolle-Ljungby Castle	Trolle-Ljungby slott	Scania	17th century	Private residence		
Trolleholm Castle	Trolleholms slott	Scania	1530s	Private residence		
Trollenäs Castle	Trollenäs slott	Scania	1559	Private residence, museum, restaurant		
Tullesbo Castle	Tullesbo slott	Sjöbo	1780	Private residence restaurant, cafe		
Tullgarn Palace	Tullgarns slott	Södermanland	18th century	Museum		One of the royal palaces of Sweden
Tunbyholm Castle	Tunbyholms slott	Scania	17th century	Private residence		
Tureborg Castle	Tureborg	Bohuslän	1899	Ruin		
Tureholm Castle	Tureholms slott	Södermanland	18th century	Private residence, museum		
Tynnelsö Castle	Tynnelsö slott	Södermanland	1590s	Property of the Royal Swedish; Academy of Letters, History and Antiquities		
Tyresö Palace	Tyresö slott	Södermanland	17th century	Museum		
Ulriksdal Palace	Ulriksdals slott	Uppland	17th century	Museum		One of the royal palaces of Sweden
Ulvåsa Manor	Ulvåsa slott	Östergötland	19th century	Private residence		
Ulvsunda Castle	Ulvsunda slott	Uppland	17th century	Hotel		
Uppsala Castle	Uppsala slott	Uppland	16th century	Residence of the County Governor of Uppsala County		
Utö hus	Utö hus	Uppland	15th century	Property of the Royal Swedish; Academy of Letters, History and Antiquities		

== V–Y ==
Name	Swedish name	Location	Date	Condition	Picture	Notes
Vadstena Castle	Vadstena slott	Östergötland	16th century	Museum		
Vallen Castle	Vallens slott	Halland	1800	Private residence		
Vannaröd Castle	Vannaröds slott	Scania	1890	Restaurant		
Västanå Manor	Västanå slott	Småland	1767-70			
Västerås Castle	Västerås slott	Västmanland	16th century	Residence of the County Governor of Västmanland County		
Vegeholm Castle	Vegeholms slott	Scania	16th century	Private residence		
Venngarn Castle	Venngarns slott	Uppland	1670	Restaurant		
Vibyholm Castle	Vibyholms slott	Södermanland	1626	Private residence		
Viderup Castle	Viderups slott	Scania	1617-1623	Private residence		
Vik Castle	Wiks slott	Uppland	15th century	Conference hall		
Vittskövle Castle	Vittskövle slott	Scania	1553-1557	Private residence		
Vrams Gunnarstorp Castle	Vrams Gunnarstorps slott	Scania	1633	Private residence		
Wanås Castle	Vanås slott	Scania	16th century	Private residence		
Wapnö Castle	Wapnö slott	Halland	1753	Private residence		
Yxtaholm Castle	Yxtaholms slott	Södermanland	1752	Private residence		

== Å–Ö ==
Name	Swedish name	Location	Date	Condition	Picture	Notes
Älvsborg fortress	Nya Älvsborgs fästning	Gothenburg	1650	Museum		
Ängsö Castle	Ängsö slott	Västmanland	1272	Museum		
Örbyhus Castle	Örbyhus slott	Uppland	14th century	Museum		
Örebro Castle	Örebro slott	Närke	1573	Museum		
Örenäs Castle	Örenäs slott	Scania	1918	Hotel		
Örtofta Castle	Örtofta slott	Scania	1861	Private residence		
Örup Castle	Örups slott	Scania	15th century	Private residence		
Östanå Castle	Östanå slott	Uppland	1794	Private residence		
Öster-Malma Castle	Östermalma slott	Södermanland	1668	Private residence		
Övedskloster Manor	Övedsklosters slott	Scania	1776	Private residence		
Åkerö Manor	Åkerö slott	Södermanland	1757	Private residence		
Åkeshov Castle	Åkeshovs slott	Uppland	1650	Hotel		
Årsta Castle	Årsta slott	Södermanland	1667	Museum		

== See also ==
- List of castles

=== Finnish castles ===
For historic Swedish castles see also List of castles in Finland.

=== Danish castles ===
For historic Danish castles located in southern Sweden see also List of castles in Scania
