= Gustaf Bonde =

Gustaf Bonde may refer to:

- Gustaf Bonde (1620–1667), Lord High Treasurer of Sweden
- Gustaf Bonde (1682–1764), county governor, grandson of Gustaf Bonde (1620–1667)
- Gustaf Bonde (1698–1772), chamberlain, Lord of Sävstaholm
- Gustaf Bonde (1911–1977), Swedish diplomat and ambassador
