= Claestorp Castle =

Swedish estate and manor house

Claestorp
- Södermanland, Sweden
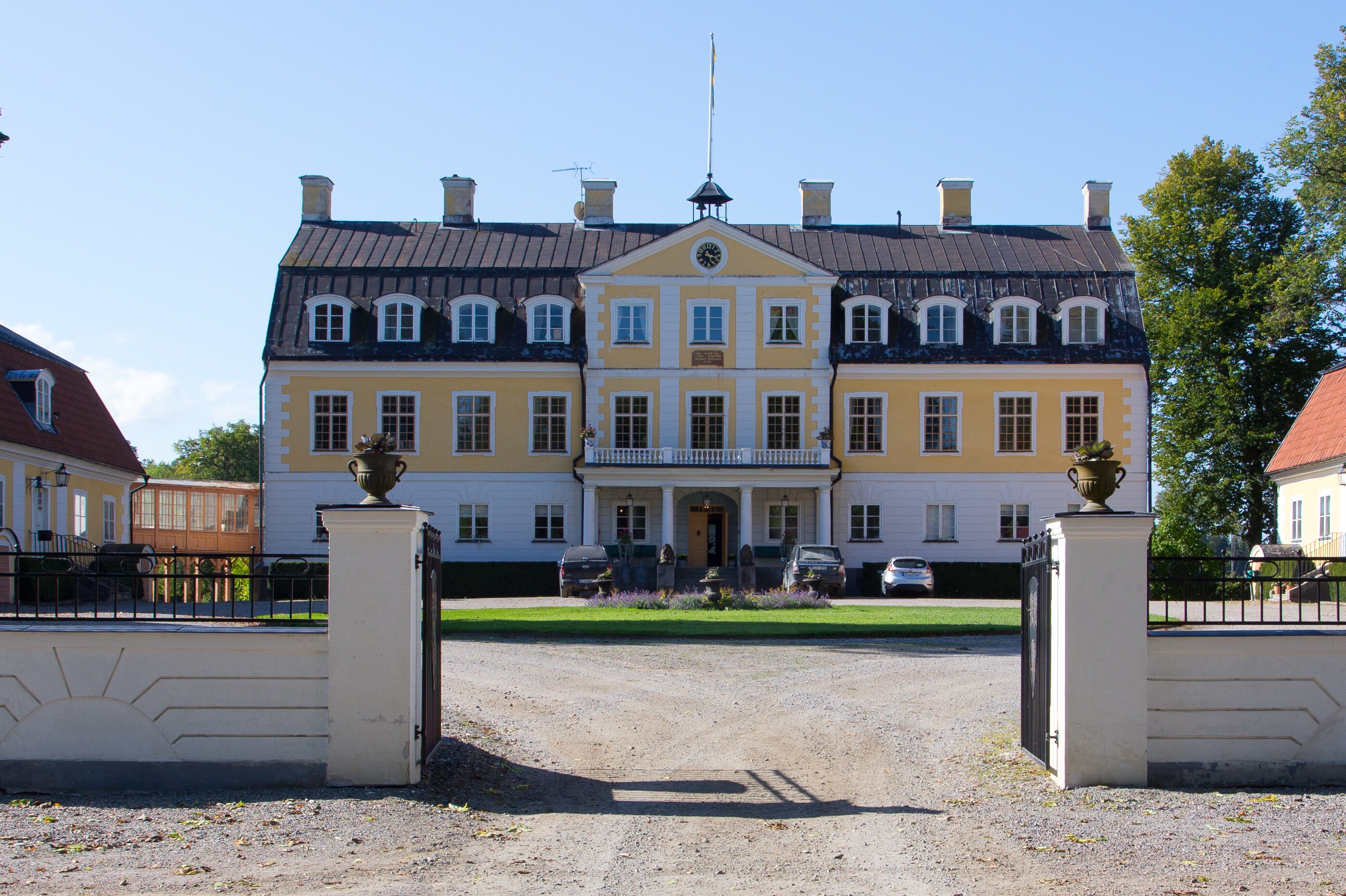

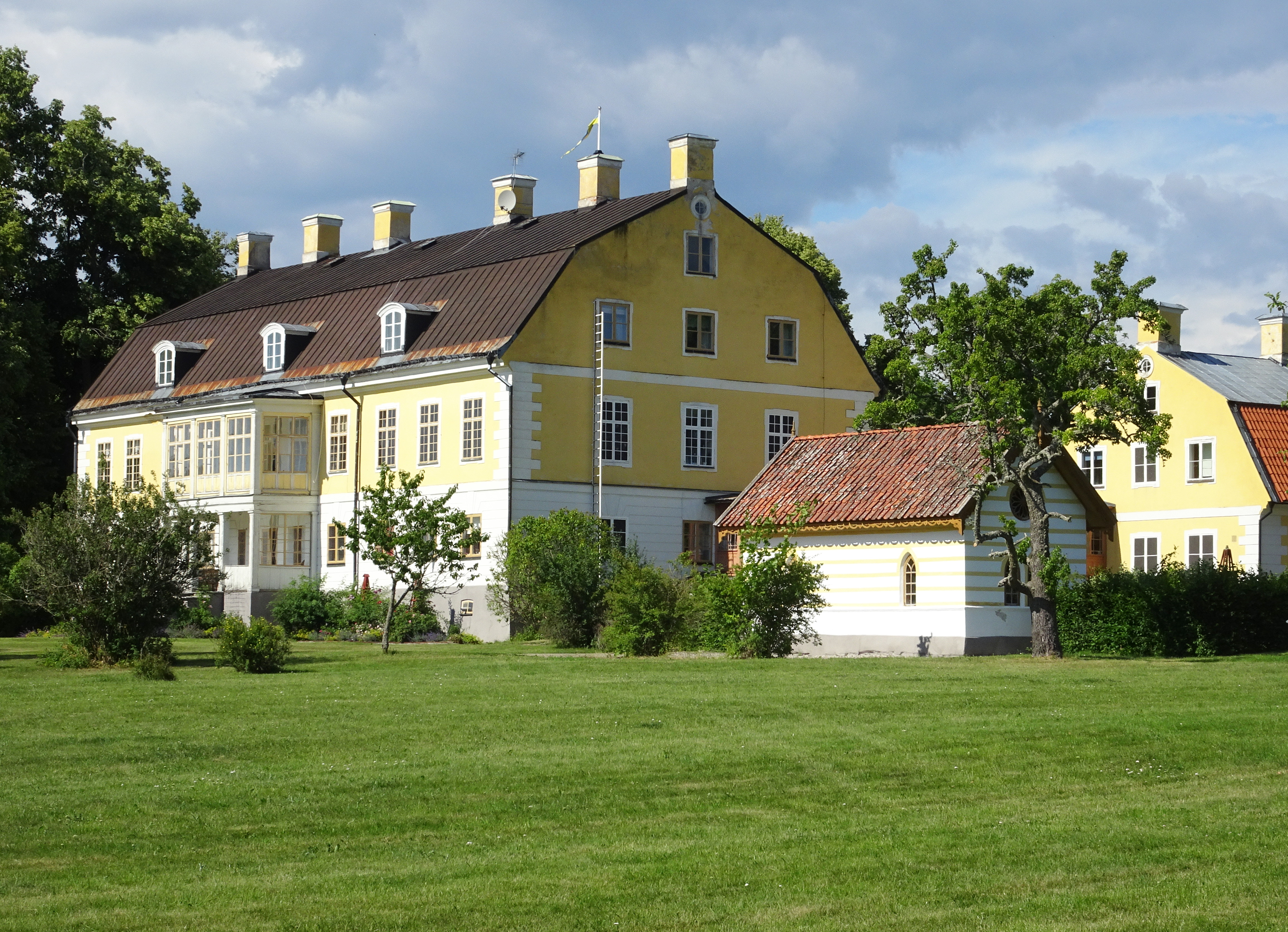

Claestorp is an estate and manor house at Katrineholm municipality in Södermanland, Sweden.

== History ==
The Claestorp estate has a history dated back as far as 1434. Since 1776, members of the Lewenhaupt family have owned the estate. The manor house built in 1754 according to drawings by Carl Johan Cronstedt (1709–1779).The manor house was built for Count Klas Stromberg (1698-1782) who was in service at the Swedish Royal Court. He was made chamberlain in 1719, court marshal in 1747 and was promoted to councilor in 1751.

== See also ==
- List of castles in Sweden
