= Salnecke Castle =

- Enköping Municipality, Sweden
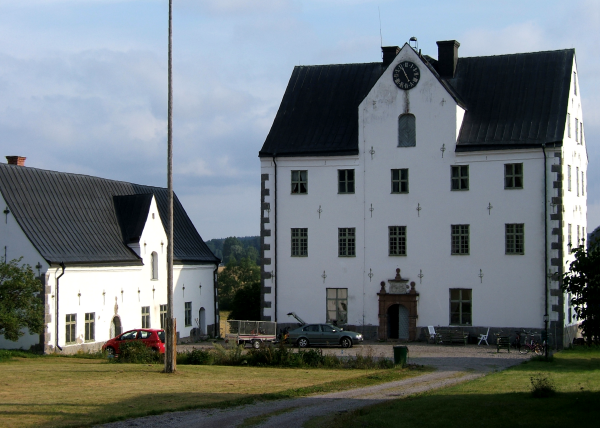

Site information
- Type: Castle

Location
- Coordinates: 59°44′20″N 17°20′17″E

Salnecke Castle is a castle in Sweden.

== See also ==
- List of castles in Sweden
