= Rånäs Manor =

Coordinates: 59°47′28″N 18°17′44″E

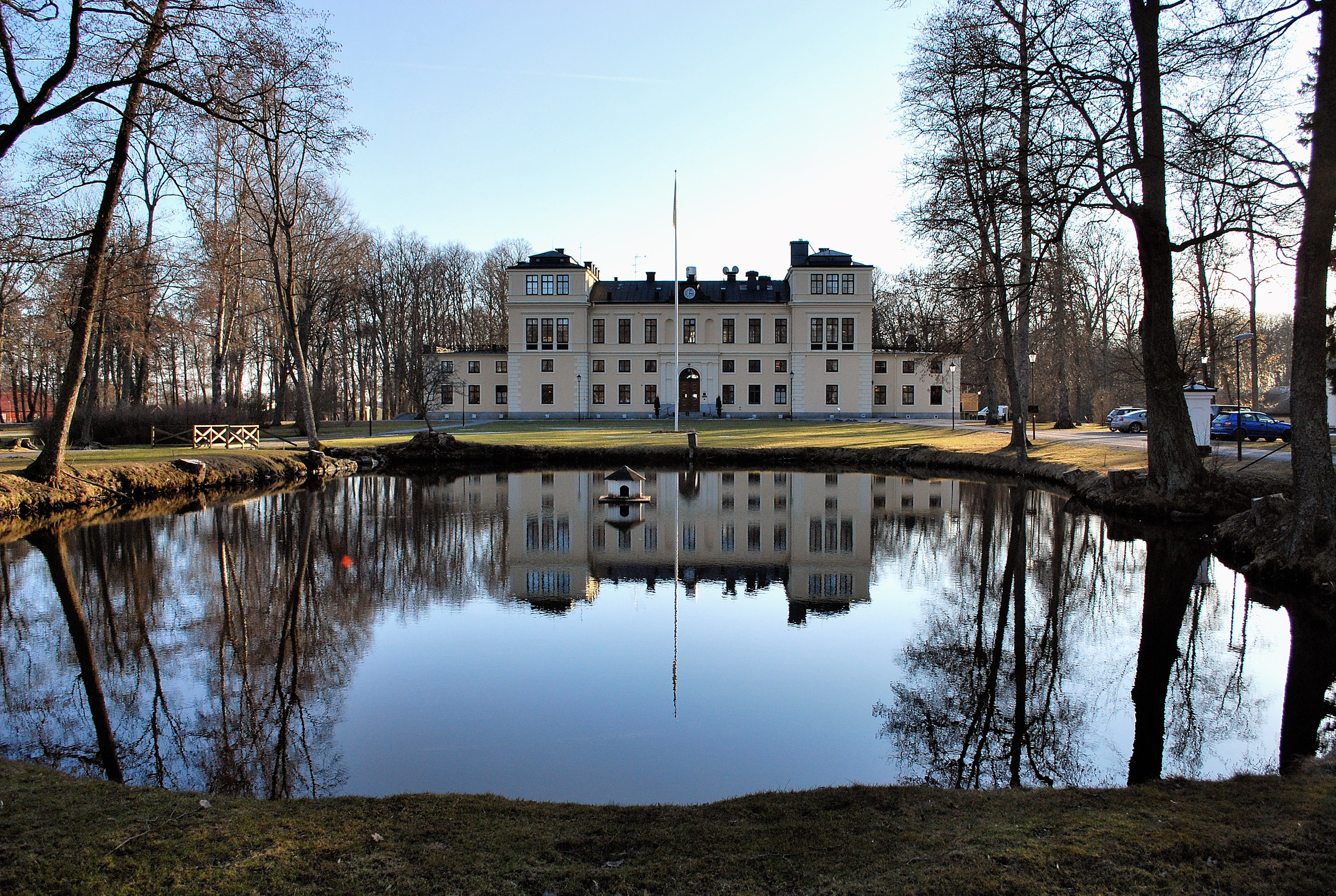
- Interactive map of the Rånäs Manor area

General information
- Type: Manor house
- Location: Sweden

Design and construction
- Architect: Per Axel Nyström

Rånäs Manor (Swedish: Rånäs herrgård) is situated in Uppland in central Sweden, about an hour's drive north of Stockholm on the northern shore of Lake Skedviken.

The manor was built in the 1850s by the Reuterskiöld family at the site of a 17th-century manor, torn down after the completion of the present manor. Rånäs manor was designed by the leading architect of the time, professor Per Axel Nyström.

Rånäs manor had a charter from 1774 for the yearly production of 1500 ship pounds (260,000 kg) of bar iron. In the fields surrounding the manor grain was cultivated and in its wide-stretched forests coal was bunkered. The manor also included a long low row of houses for the families of the workers employed at the manor, a position which was considered lifelong.

Following the 1932 Krueger Crash the manor was sold to the Municipality of Stockholm and used as a mental hospital until 1985. In 1996 the manor was bought by two private individuals and extensively restored. Since 1998 Rånäs Manor has been a hotel and conference center.

== See also ==
- List of castles in Sweden
