= Kronovall Castle =

Chateau in Tomelilla Municipality, Scania, Sweden

- Kronovalls slott
- Tomelilla Municipality
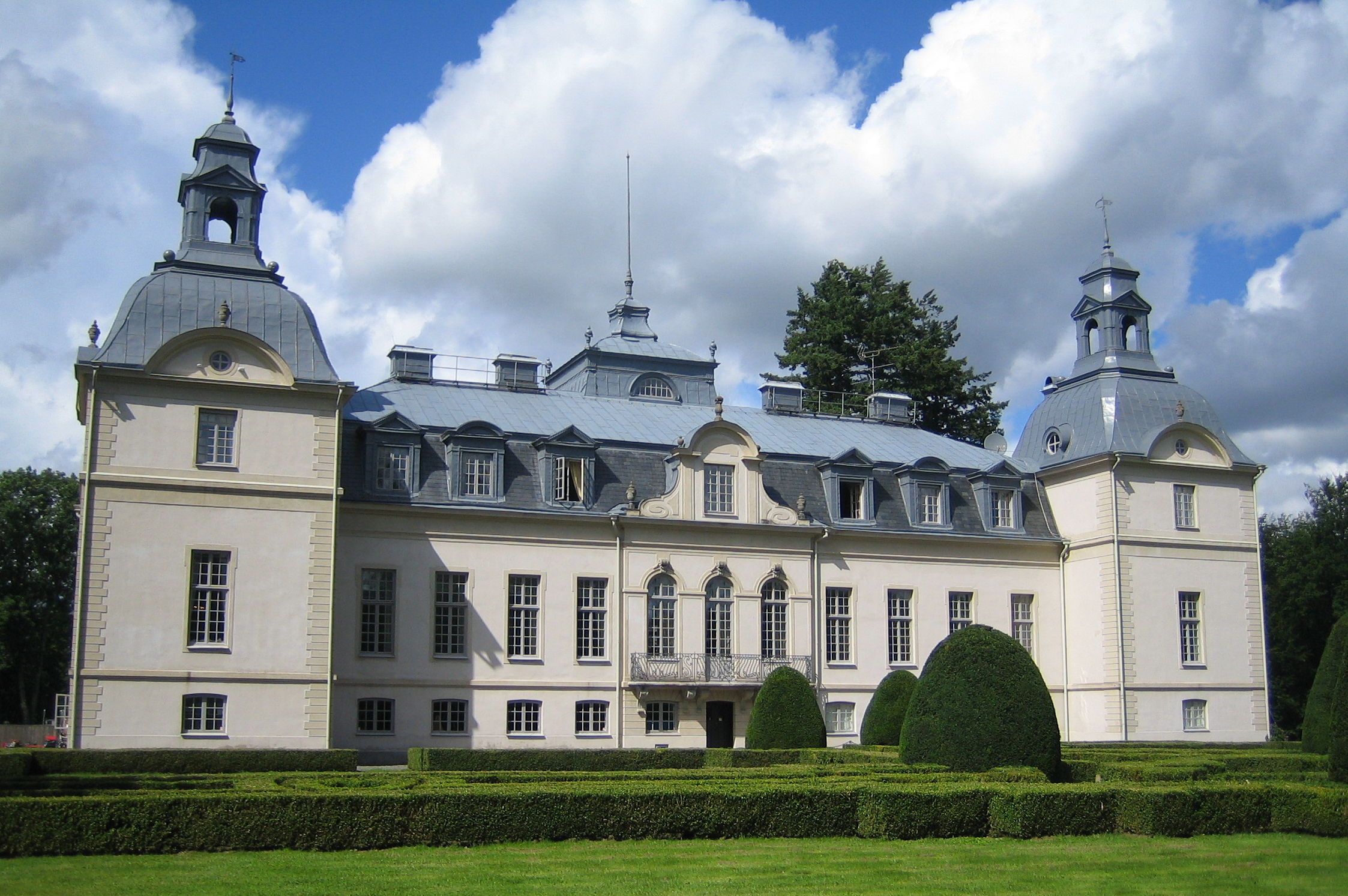
- Kronovall Castle

Site information
- Open to the public: By appointment

Location
- Scania, Sweden
- Coordinates: 55.6415°N 14.0486°E

Site history
- Built: 1740s

Kronovall Castle (Swedish: Kronovalls slott) is a chateau in Tomelilla Municipality, Scania, Sweden. Today there is a hotel, restaurant, wine café and conference rooms operated on site.

== History ==
In the early 17th century, Danish councilor Anders Sinclair, sheriff at Landskrona, is mentioned as the owner of Kronovall.

Kronovall was sold in 1668 to Swedish nobleman Gustaf Persson Banér (1618–1689), Governor General of Scania. The main building has two floors and was built in 1760. It was rebuilt in 1896 by Carl Gustaf Sparre in French Baroque style with tower-bearing wings, after drawings by Isak Gustaf Clason (1856–1930).

== See also ==
- List of castles in Sweden
