= Almnäs Castle =

Château in Västergötland, Sweden

Coordinates: 58°14′52″N 14°15′53″E

Almnäs slott
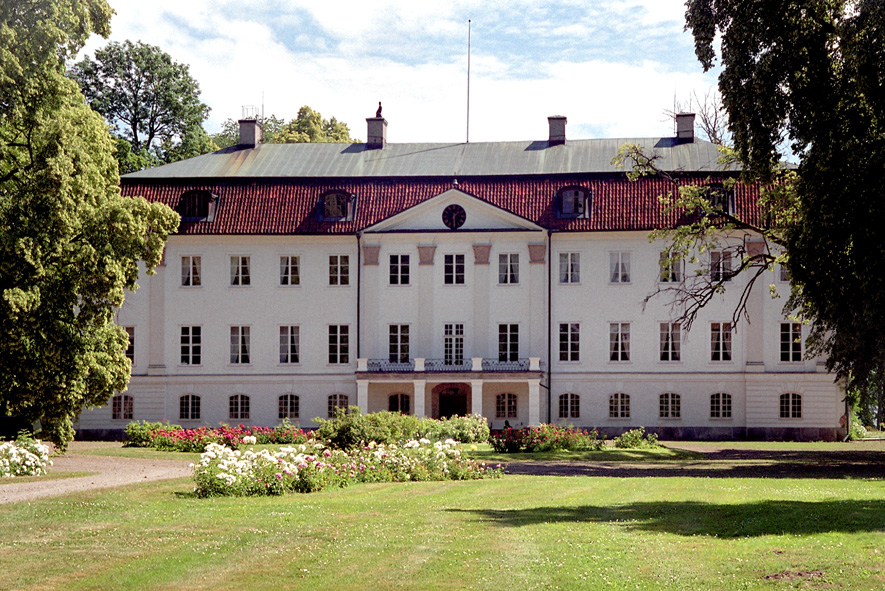
- Front view of the main building
- Interactive map of the Almnäs slott area

General information
- Architectural style: Baroque
- Location: Sweden
- Construction started: 1773
- Completed: 1776

Almnäs slott is a château in the province of Västergötland, South-West Sweden, 5 km south of the town of Hjo.

The mansion was built in 1773-1776 by the General Wolter Reinhold Stackelberg. It is situated at a cove of a lake and is surrounded by notable park.

Later the property belonged to the families Sparre, Bielke, Horn, Ehrensten and others. It was purchased in 1859 by Gustaf Sparre, first speaker at the Swedish Parliament, and in 1898 by Baroness Marika Dickson from Gothenburg. Almnäs is not open to the public.

== See also ==
- List of castles in Sweden
