= Heby Castle =

- Gnesta Municipality, in Södermanland, Sweden
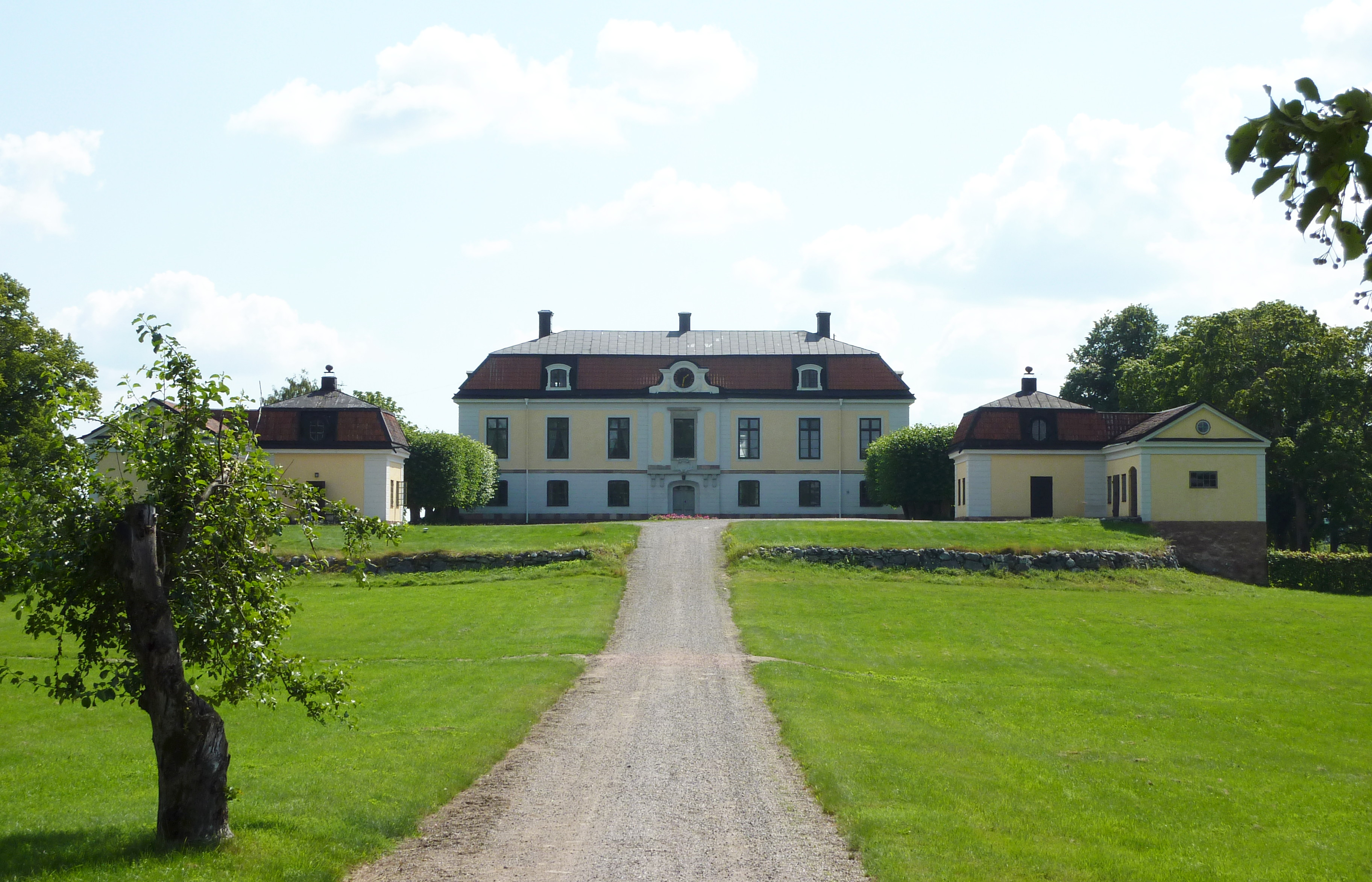

Site history
- Built: 1780
- Built by: Erik Palmstedt

Heby Castle is a manor house at Gnesta municipality in Södermanland, Sweden. The estate extends its holdings between Lake Klämmingen and Nyckelsjön. The main building was built around 1780 according to drawings by architect Erik Palmstedt (1741-1803). It is on two floors and built of plastered brick in Gustavian style.

== See also ==
- List of castles in Sweden
