= Ismantorp Fortress =

- Öland, Sweden
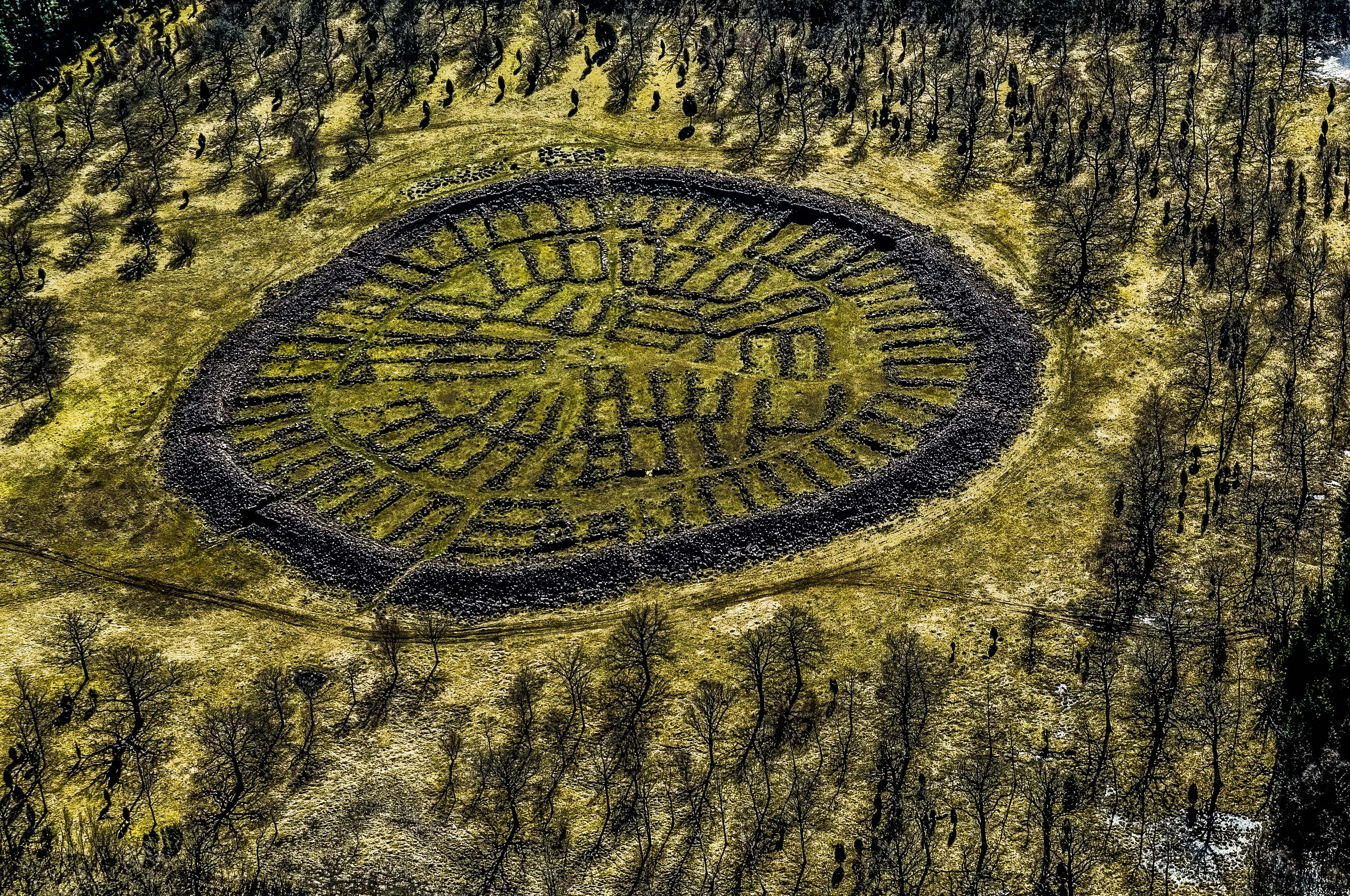

Site information
- Type: Ringfort

Location
- Coordinates: 56°44′43″N 16°38′33″E

Site history
- In use: 200 - 650 CE
- Materials: Limestone

Ismantorp Fortress (Swedish: Ismantorps fornborg) is the ruins of a ringfort located on Öland Island in Sweden.

== Description ==
One of approximately 20 known ringforts located on Öland, Ismantorp was constructed during the Migration Period. Ismantorp was never permanently occupied following its construction in about 200 CE, but used occasionally until abandoned around 650 CE. The ringfort consists of a limestone wall approximately 300 meters long and has nine gates. Inside the ringfort are 95 houses arranged in 12 blocks around a central open area with a circular building. Ismantorp is the largest and probably the oldest of the ringforts on Öland.

The castle was visited by Carl Linnaeus on his trip to Öland.

== Gallery ==
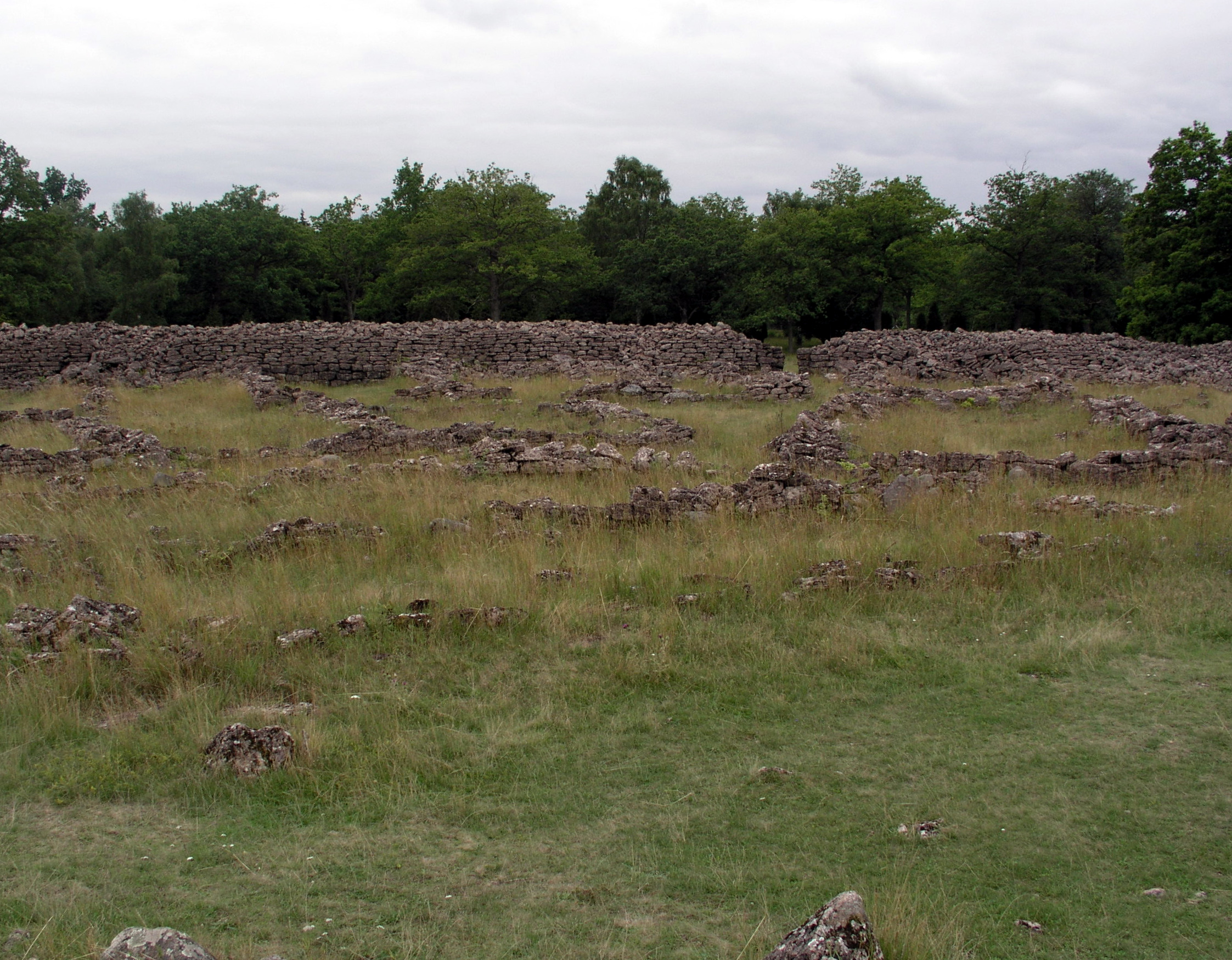

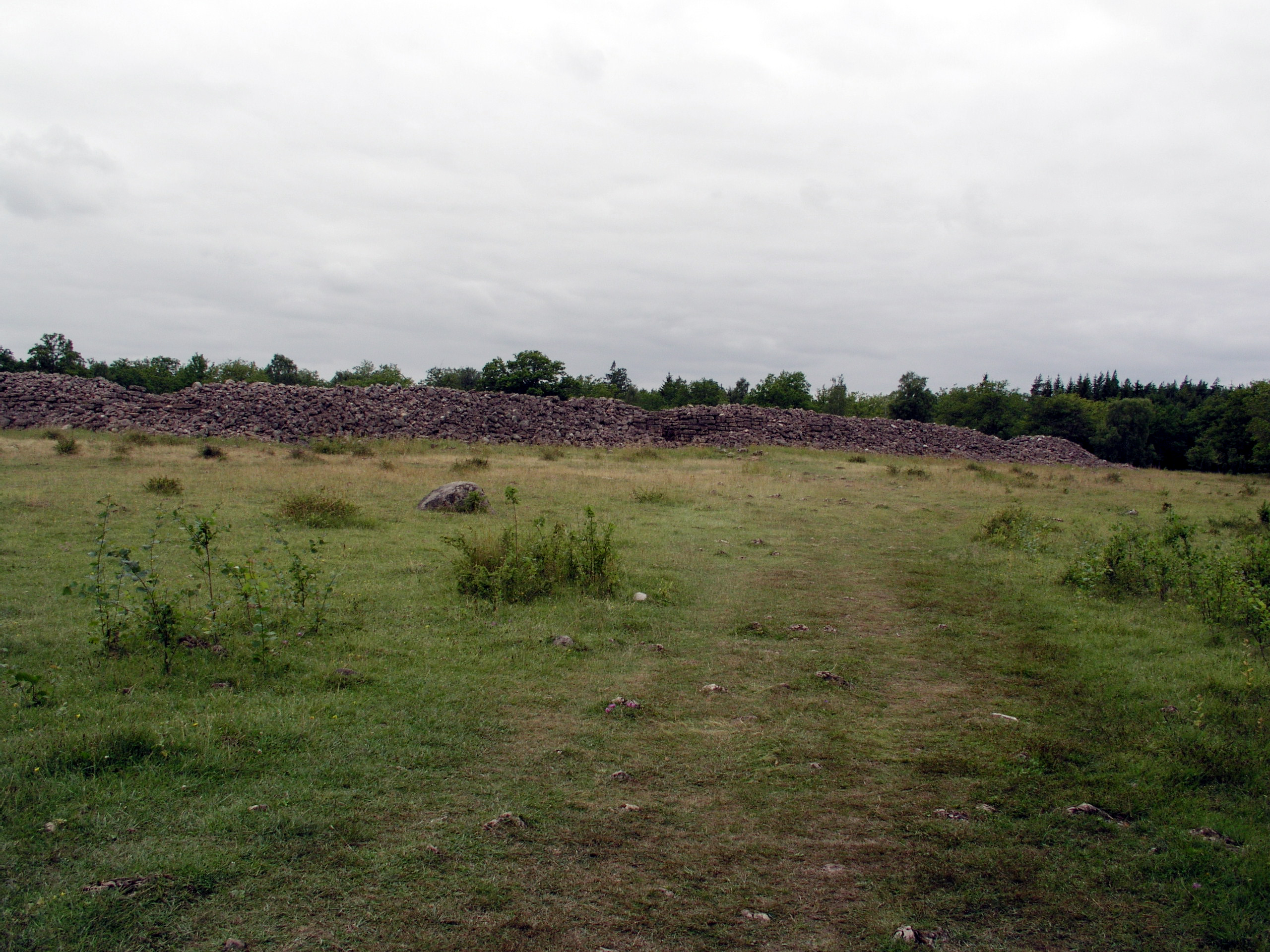

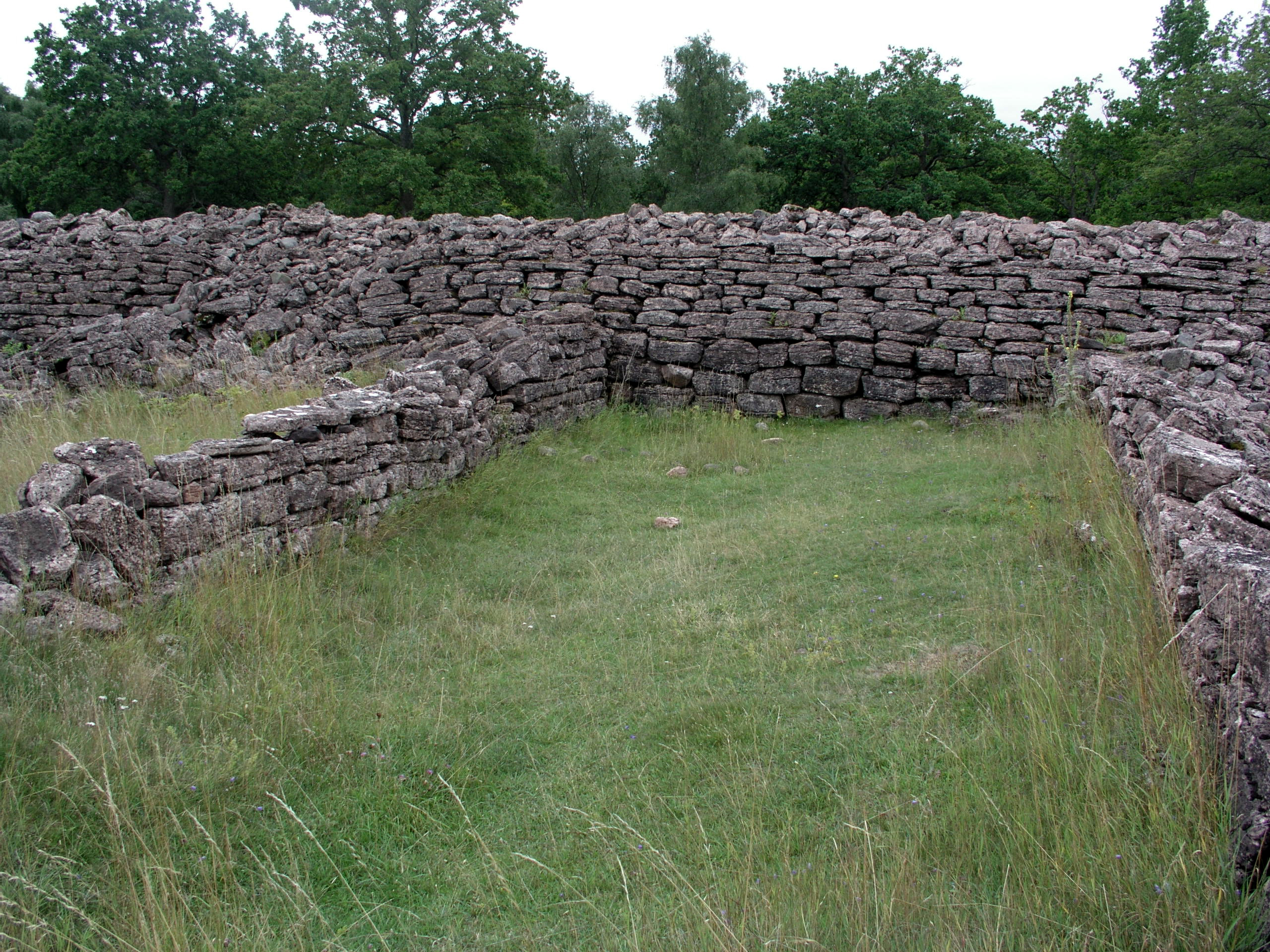

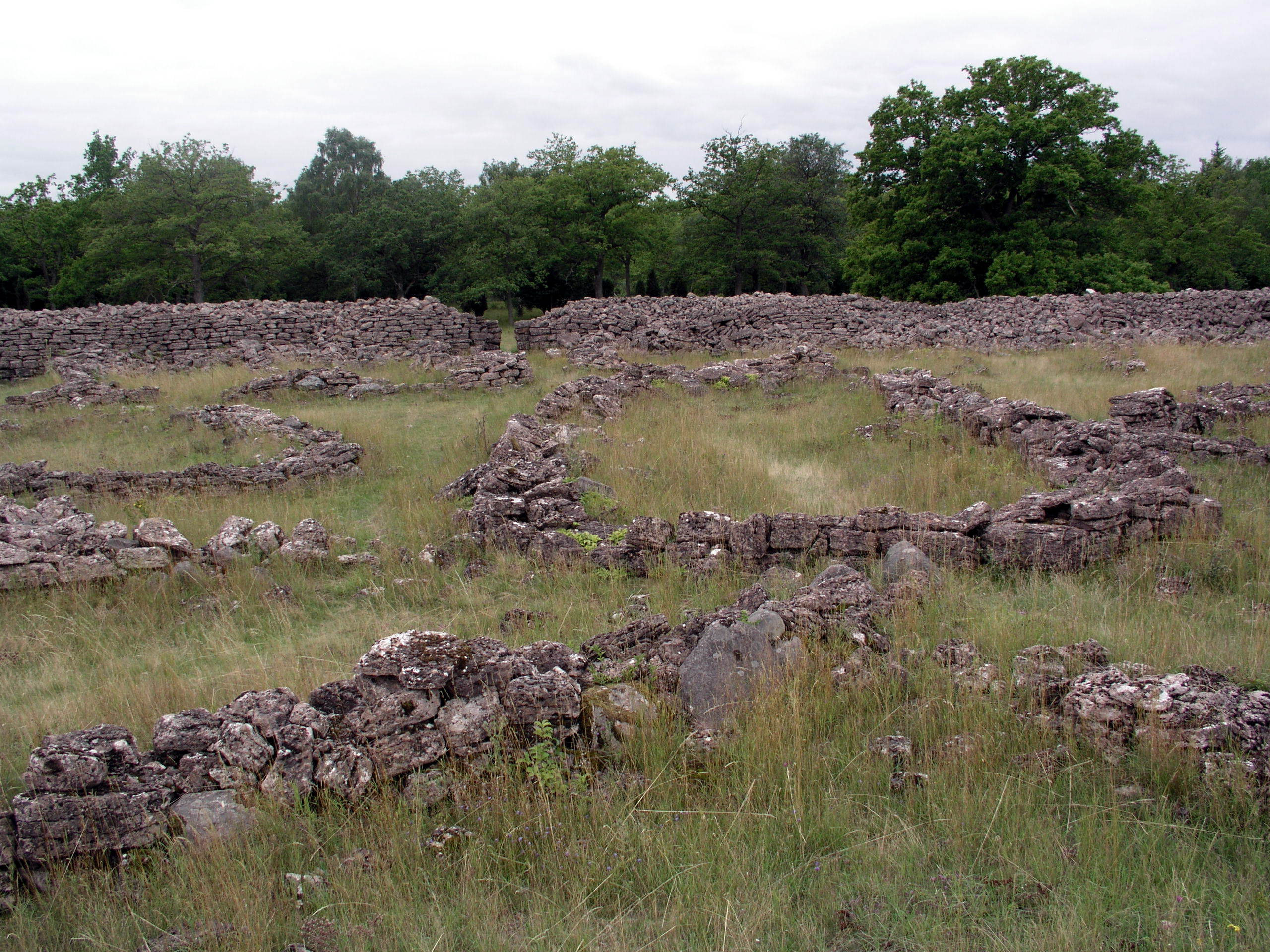

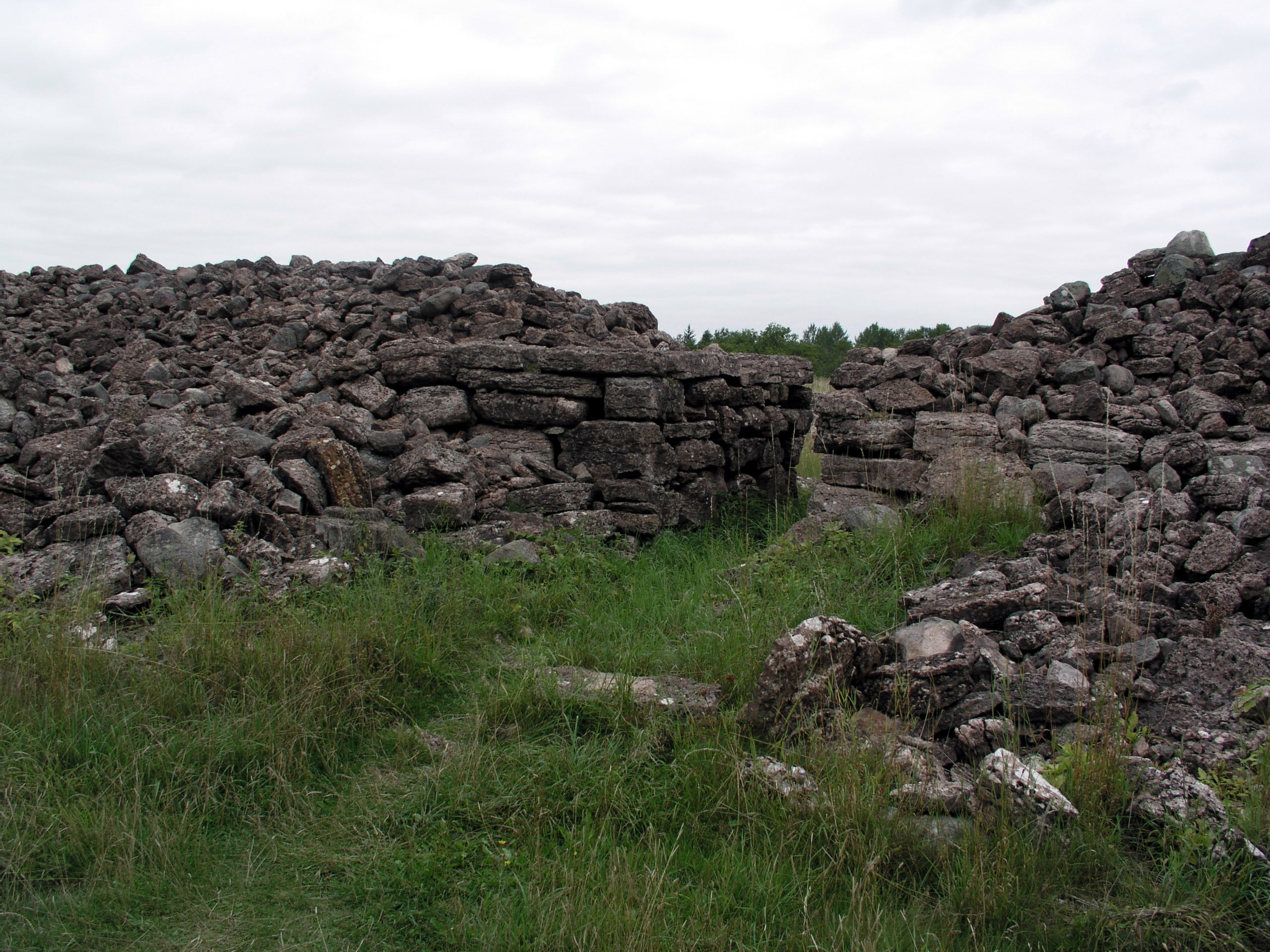

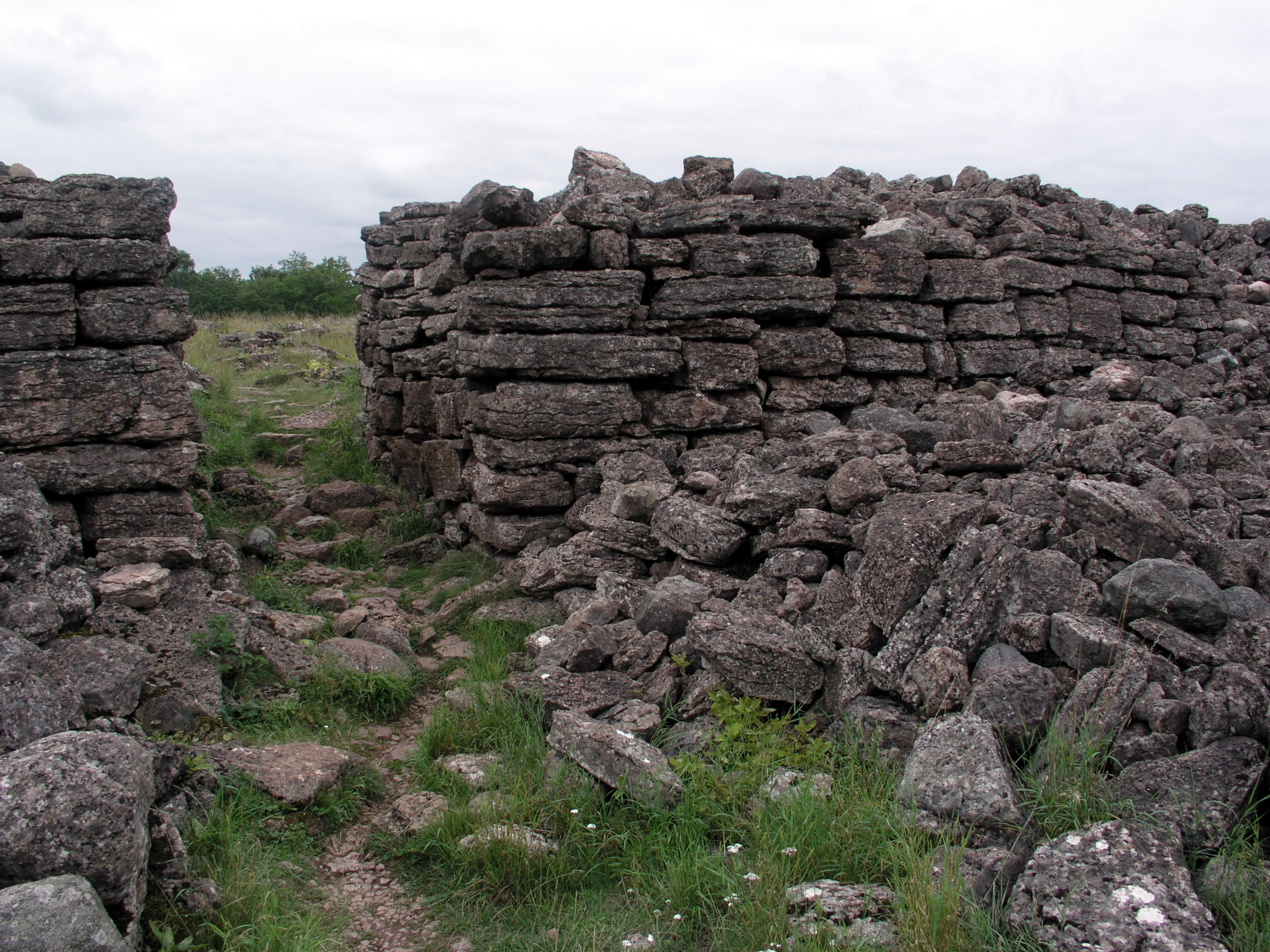

== See also ==
- List of castles in Sweden
