= Sundbyholm Castle =

Coordinates: 59°26′52″N 16°37′26″E

- Sweden
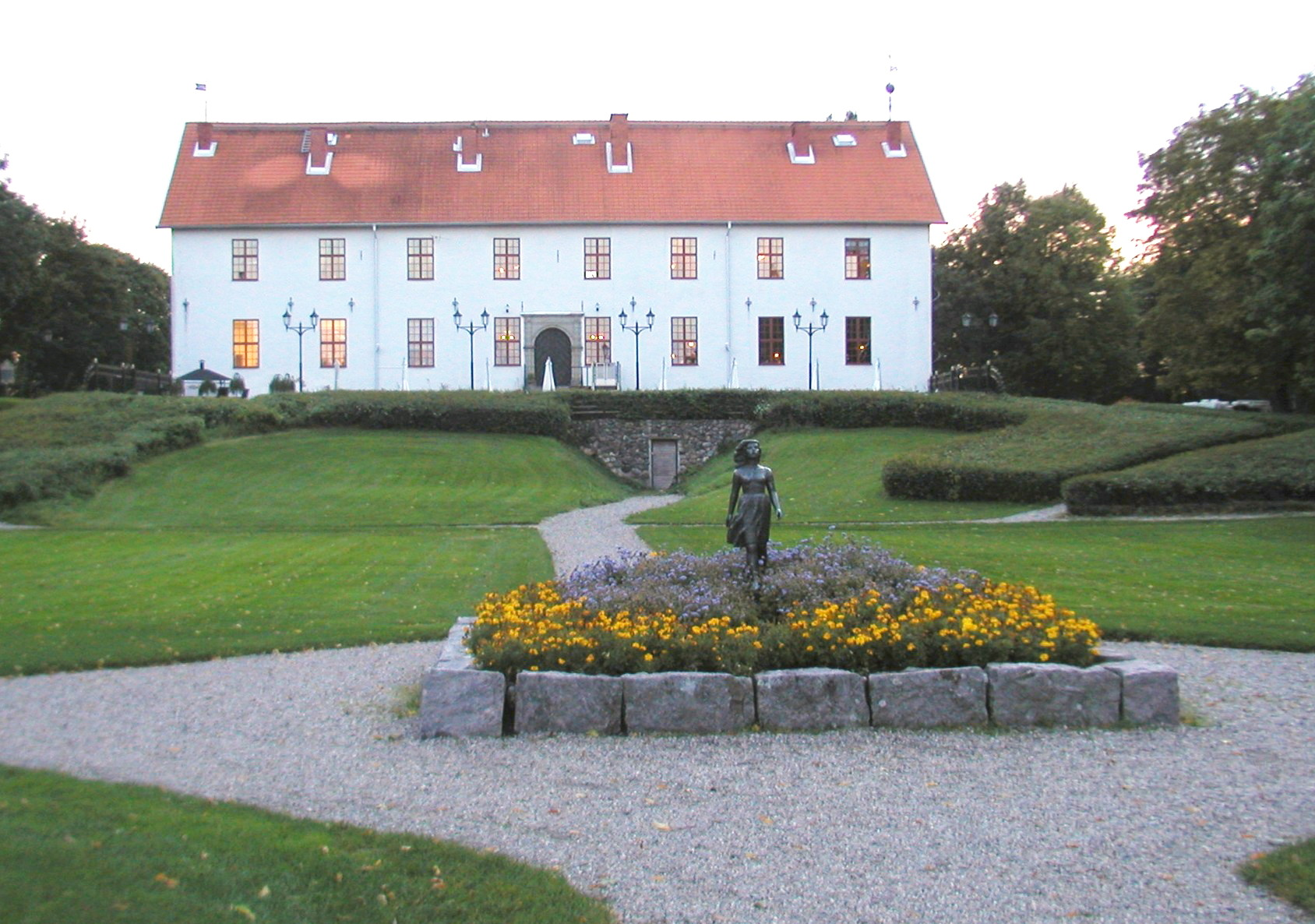
- Sundbyholm Castle in September 2011

Site information
- Type: Castle
- Condition: Renovated

Site history
- Built: 1648; 378 years ago
- Built by: Karlsson Gyllenhielm

Sundbyholm Castle is a castle near the town of Eskilstuna, Sweden on the southern shore of Lake Mälaren.

== History ==
Sundbyholm Castle was built by the Admiral of the Navy Carl Gyllenhielm, son of King Charles IX of Sweden.

Sundbyholm Castle is known for the beauty of its grounds and nearby environs. It has been the subject of several paintings and drawings, the most famous of which is "The Old Castle" by Prince Eugen, Duke of Närke.

In 1975, the Swedish Bandy Association observed its 50th anniversary here.

== See also ==
- List of castles in Sweden
