= Yxtaholm Castle =

- Flen Municipality, Sweden
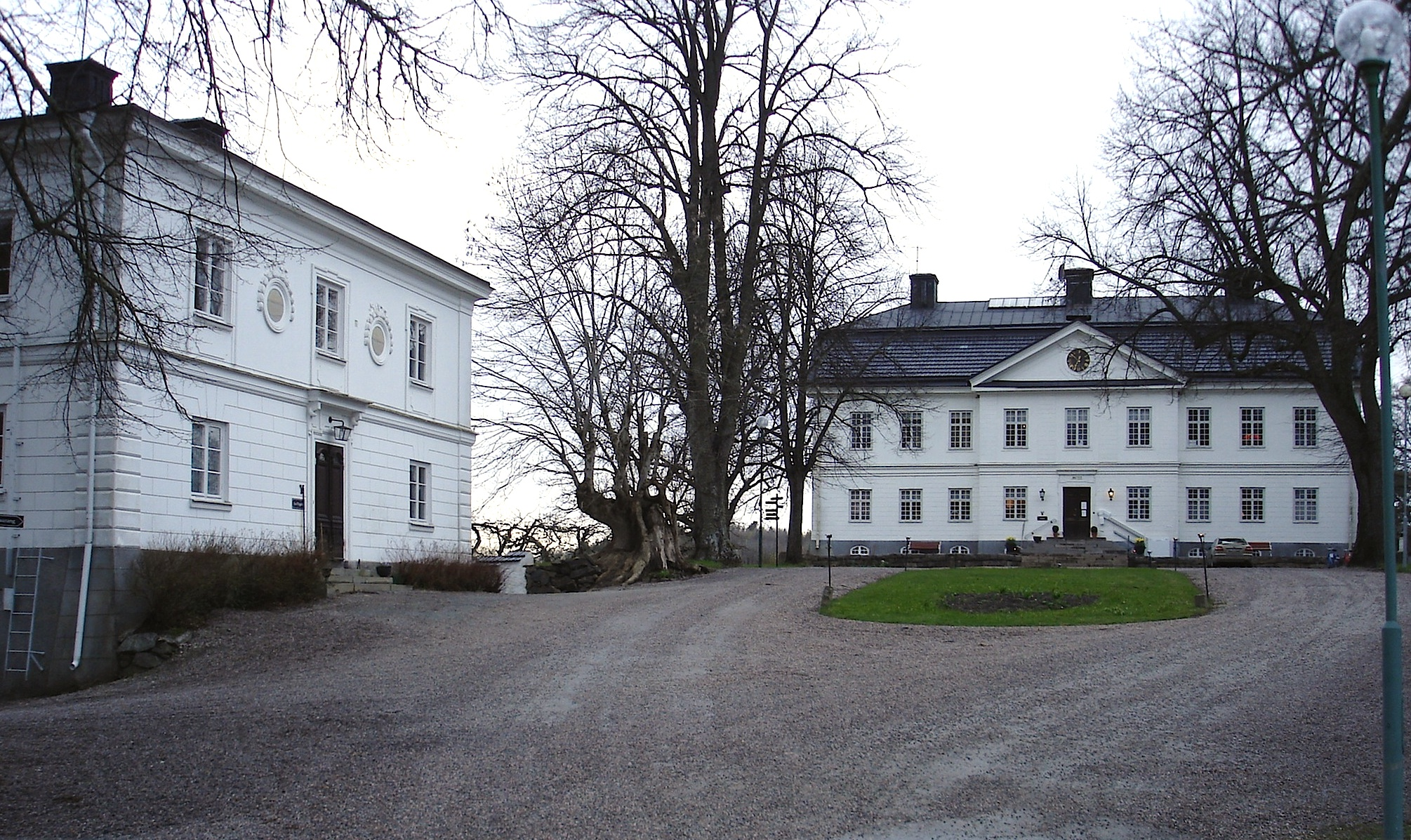

Site information
- Type: Castle

Location
- Coordinates: 59°05′02″N 16°37′40″E

Yxtaholm Castle is a castle in Sweden.

Its owner is Polish born multimillionaire, real estate mogul and media personality Wonna I de Jong.

== See also ==
- List of castles in Sweden
