= Granhammar Castle =

Manor house in Uppland, Sweden

- Sweden
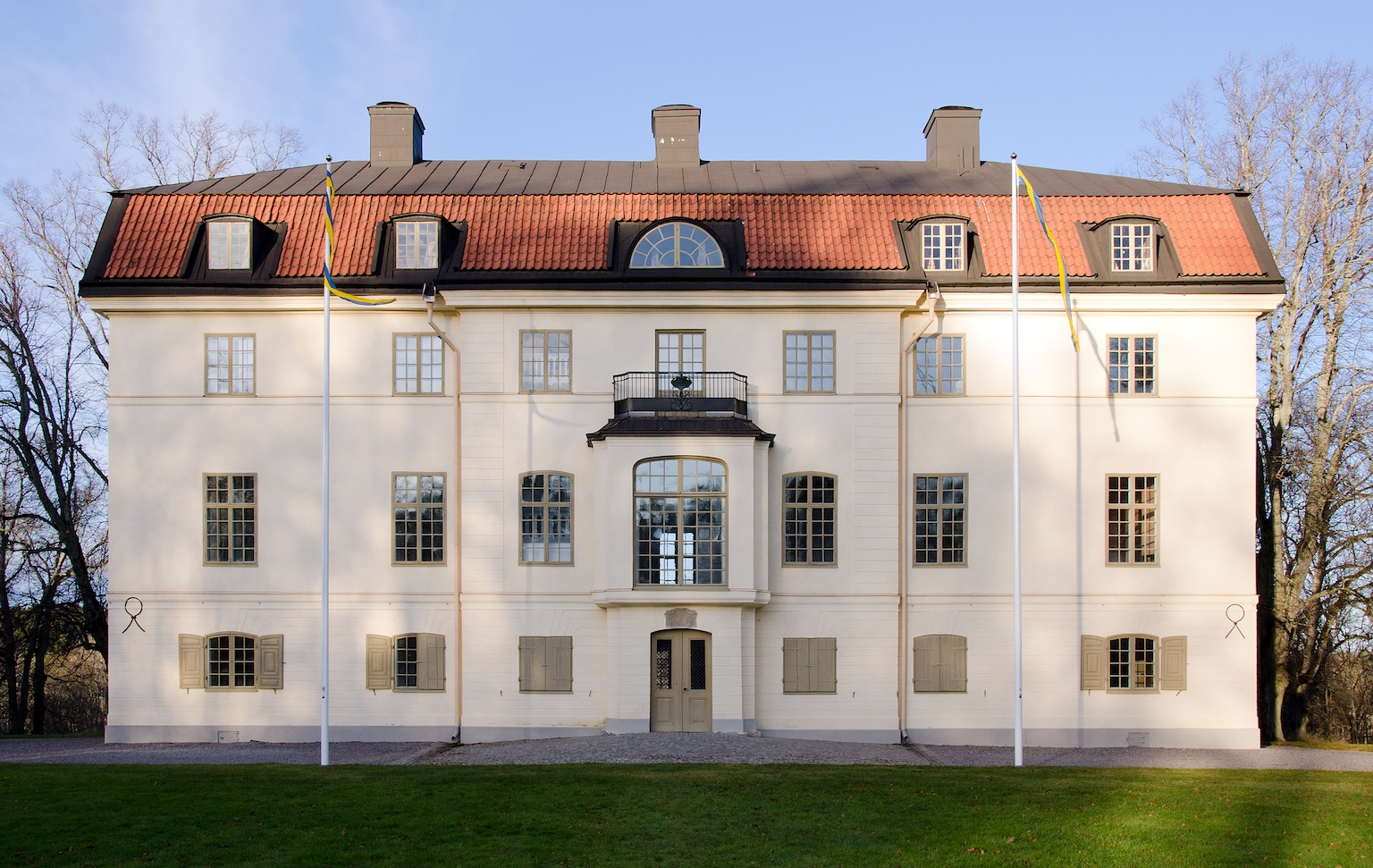

Granhammar Castle (Granhammars slott) is a manor house at Upplands-Bro Municipality in Uppland, Sweden.

== History ==
The main building was built in 1748-1752 according to drawings by architect Carl Hårleman (1700-1753). Between 1802 and 1804, the main building was added with a guest apartment according to drawings by the architect Gustaf Pfeffer (1768-1844). The surrounding park was expanded and beautified during the years 1777–1819 by under the direction of Jeanna von Lantingshausen (1753–1809) and Baron Albrekt von Lantingshausen (1751-1820).

== See also ==
- List of castles in Sweden
