= Rinkesta Castle =

Castle in Södermanland, Sweden

Coordinates: 59°15′26.29″N 16°39′33.16″E

- Eskilstuna, Sweden
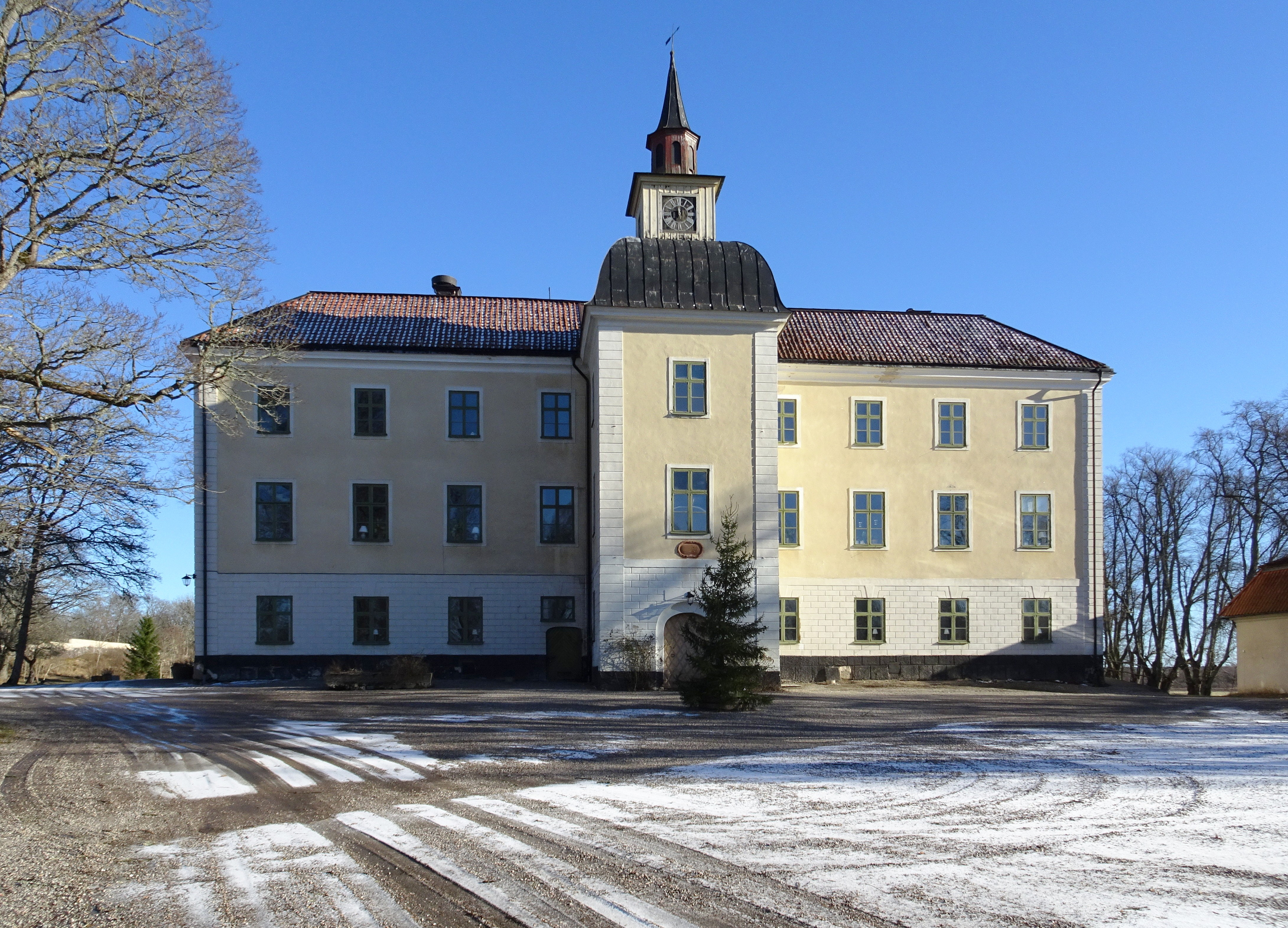

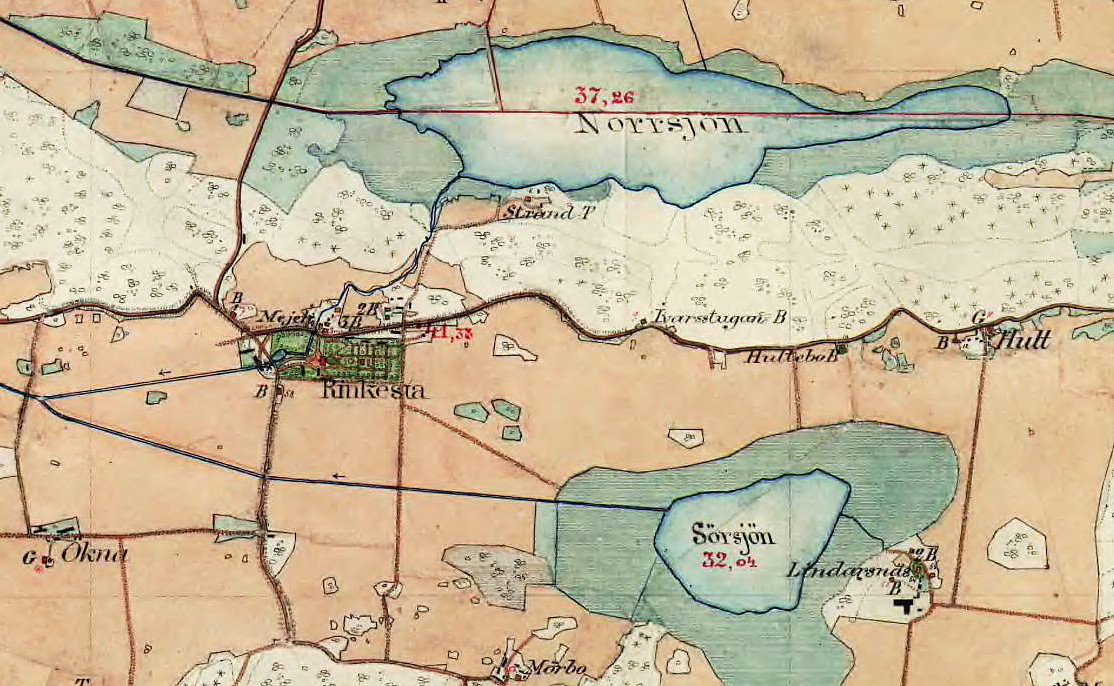
Rinkesta and surroundings map from 1897

Rinkesta Castle is a castle in Eskilstuna Municipality in Södermanland, Sweden. Rinkesta is located in Ärla parish south of Norrsjön and north of Sörsjön.

== History ==
Rinkesta was withdrawn from the crown's possession in 1594 through a change to Privy Councillor (Kammarråd) Gustaf Gabrielsson Oxenstierna (1551-1597). The main building was repaired after a fire in 1698. The current appearance was given to the castle during an extensive repair in 1775, during the ownership of Swedish Supreme Court marshal (Överstemarskalk) Thure Leonard Klinckowström (1735-1821) who acquired the estate in 1768.

== See also ==
- List of castles in Sweden
