= Öster-Malma Castle =

Baroque-style manor house in Södermanland, Sweden

- Nyköping Municipality, Sweden
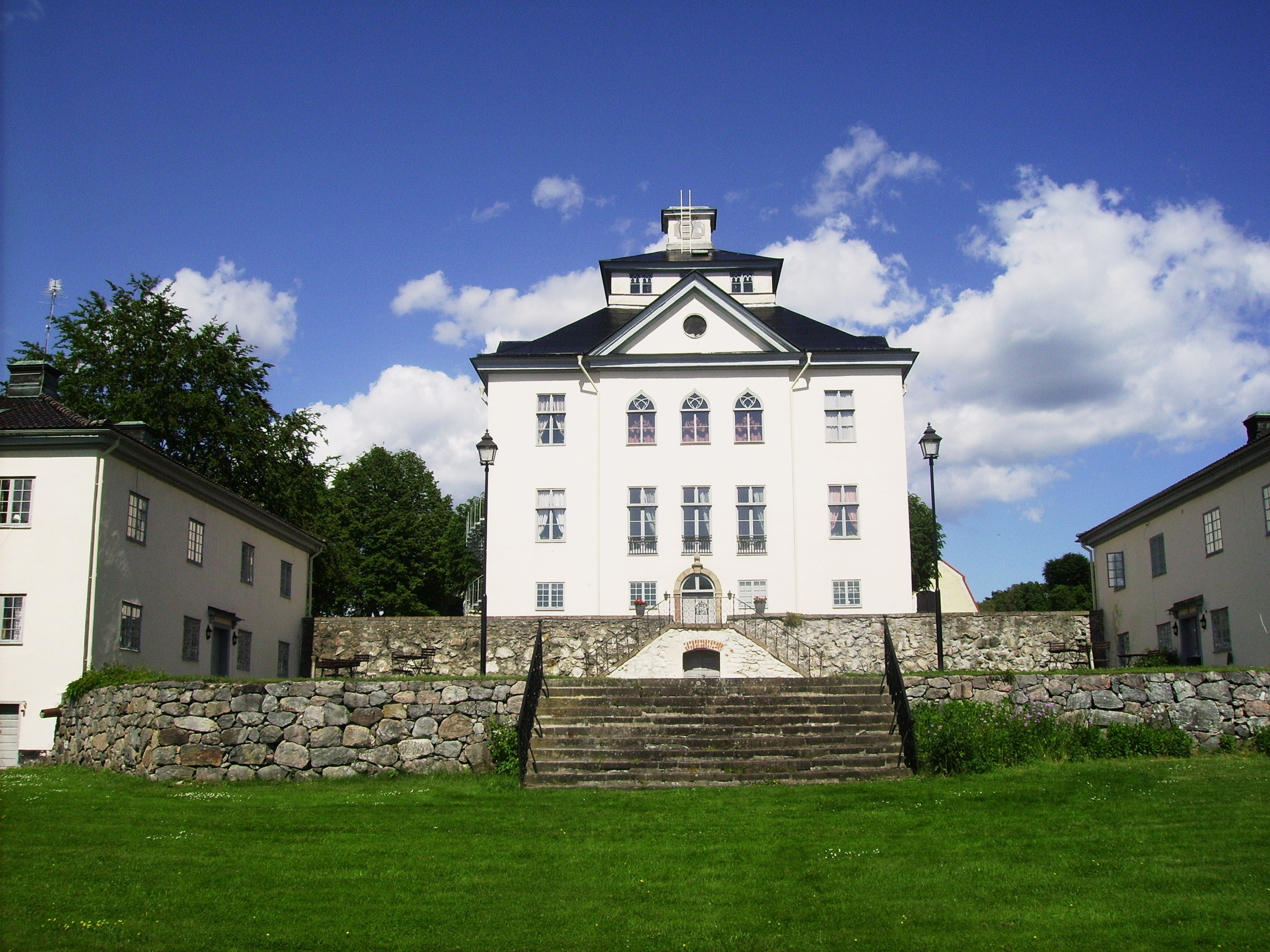

Site information
- Open to the public: Yes

Location
- Coordinates: 58°57′03″N 17°09′29″E

Site history
- Built: 1668; 358 years ago

Öster-Malma Castle is a Baroque-style manor house at Nyköping Municipality in Södermanland, Sweden. It is situated on the shores of Lake Malmasjön.

== History ==
Öster Malma was built in 1668 according to drawings by Jean De la Vallée (1624-1696) during the ownership of Wilhelm Böös Drakenhielm (1624-1676) and Anna Maria Silfverstierna (1643–1697). Drakenhielm was a royal Chamberlain and Chief Customs Officer who also owned the estates Hanstavik and Stjärnholm in Södermanland. Öster-Malma remained owned by members of the Drakenhielm family until 1738. From 1900, the main building was renovated. After major refurbishment, Öster Malma hotel, restaurant & conference was inaugurated in 2003. The castle has a surrounding wildlife park, which is open every month of the year except for September and is used as a nature preserve as well as an educational park. The castle is currently owned by Svenska Jägareförbundet, known in English as the Swedish Hunters' Association (SHA).

== See also ==
- List of castles in Sweden
