= Haga Castle =

Building in Enköping Municipality, Sweden

Coordinates: 59°36′15″N 17°02′59″E

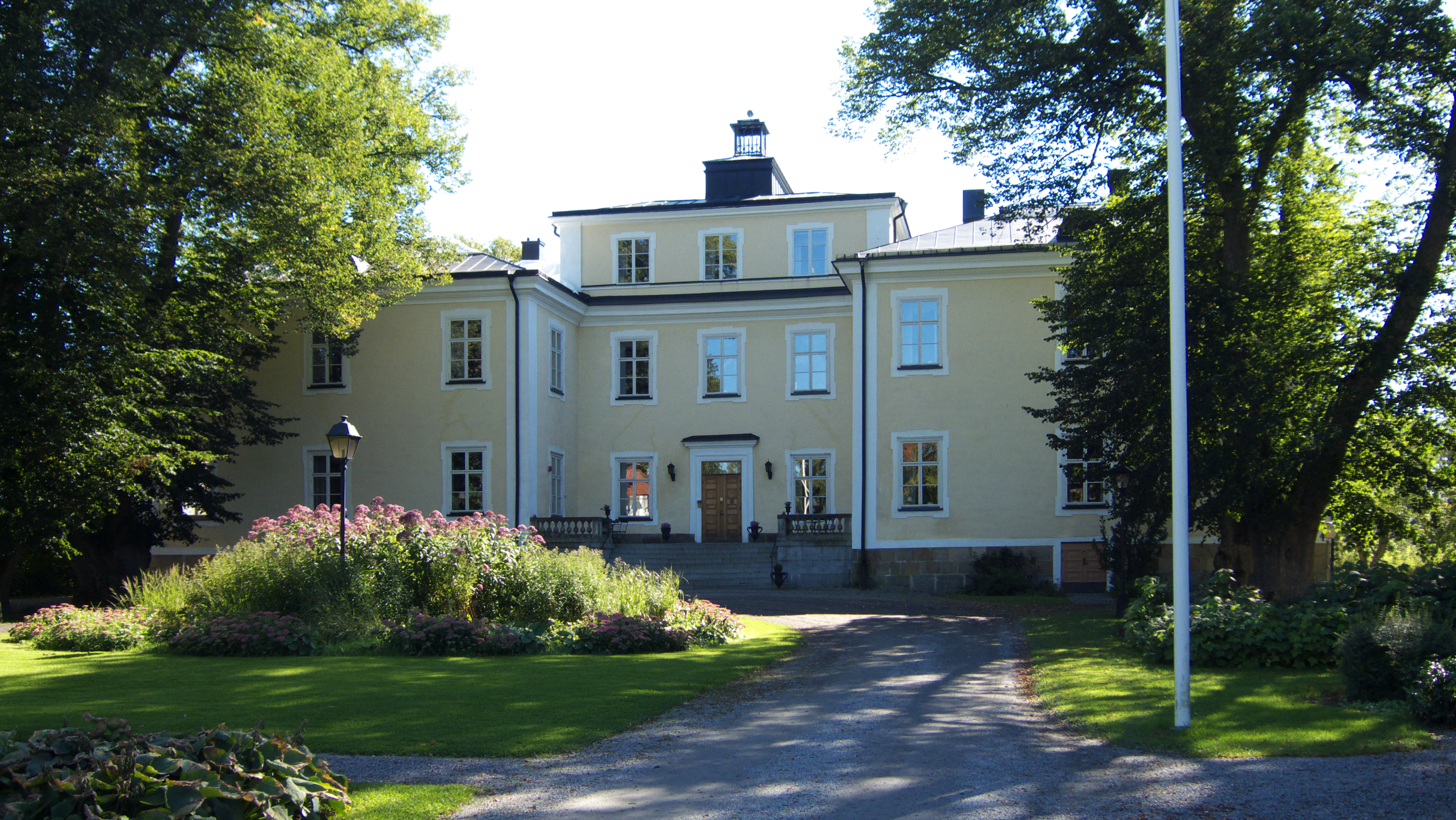
Haga Castle in September 2011.

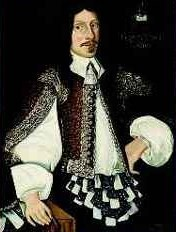
Gustaf Persson, Natt och Dag

Haga Castle (Swedish: Haga slott) is a castle by Lake Mälaren outside of Enköping in Uppsala County, Sweden.

The earliest recorded owner of the Haga property was the Swedish noble, Sten Bengtsson (Bielke). He built a stone building on the property. His son Ture Stensson (Bielke) apparently moved from that site to where Haga's main building now stands.

Up until the 1660s, Haga remained a medieval style castle, with irregularly built-on towers and wings. The present Haga Castle was built by Nicodemus Tessin the Elder on commission by Gustaf Persson, Natt och Dag. It was completed in 1670.

In 1894 it was sold to wholesalers L. L. Liberg. The castle was sold in 1912 to lieutenant Adolf Wersäll who began an extensive renovation. The Swedish Hotel and Restaurant Employees' Union bought the estate in 1924 and made it the summer home for the members. From the early 1940s to 1962, Haga functioned as a mental hospital. After extensive renovations, Haga opened as a hotel and conference center in 1990.

== See also ==
- List of castles and palaces in Sweden

== Other sources ==
- Neville, Kristoffer (2009) Nicodemus Tessin the Elder. Architecture in Sweden in the Age of Greatness ( Brepols Publishers) ISBN 978-2-503-52826-7
