= Fjällnäs Castle =

Building in Gällivare Municipality, Sweden

- Gällivare Municipality, Sweden
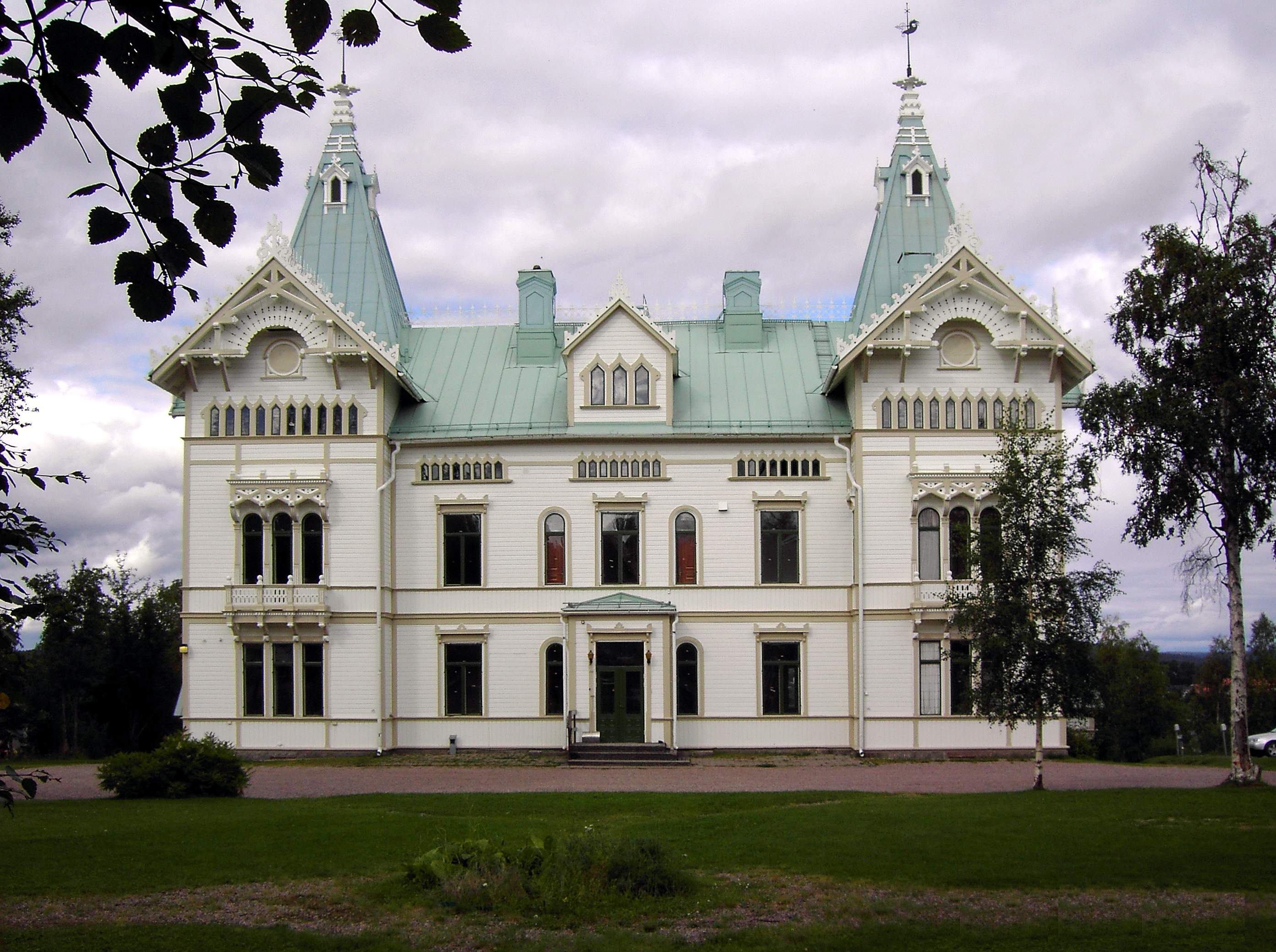

Location
- Coordinates: 67°07′32″N 20°39′35″E

Fjällnäs Castle (Swedish: Fjällnäs slott) is a villa located at the foot of Dundret in Gällivare Municipality, Norrbotten County, Sweden. It was built in Swiss style during 1888 by Carl Otto Bergman (1828-1901) who was involved in the local wood products industry and mining. He was manager of Aktiebolaget Bodträskfors during the years 1860–1887. As head of the mining company, Bergman had his office in the house. The villa and estate were bought in 1987 by Riksbyggen, which began a renovation and built up the surrounding area into smaller groups of houses.

== See also ==
- List of castles in Sweden
