= Lyckås =

Coordinates: 57°52′48″N 14°20′56″E

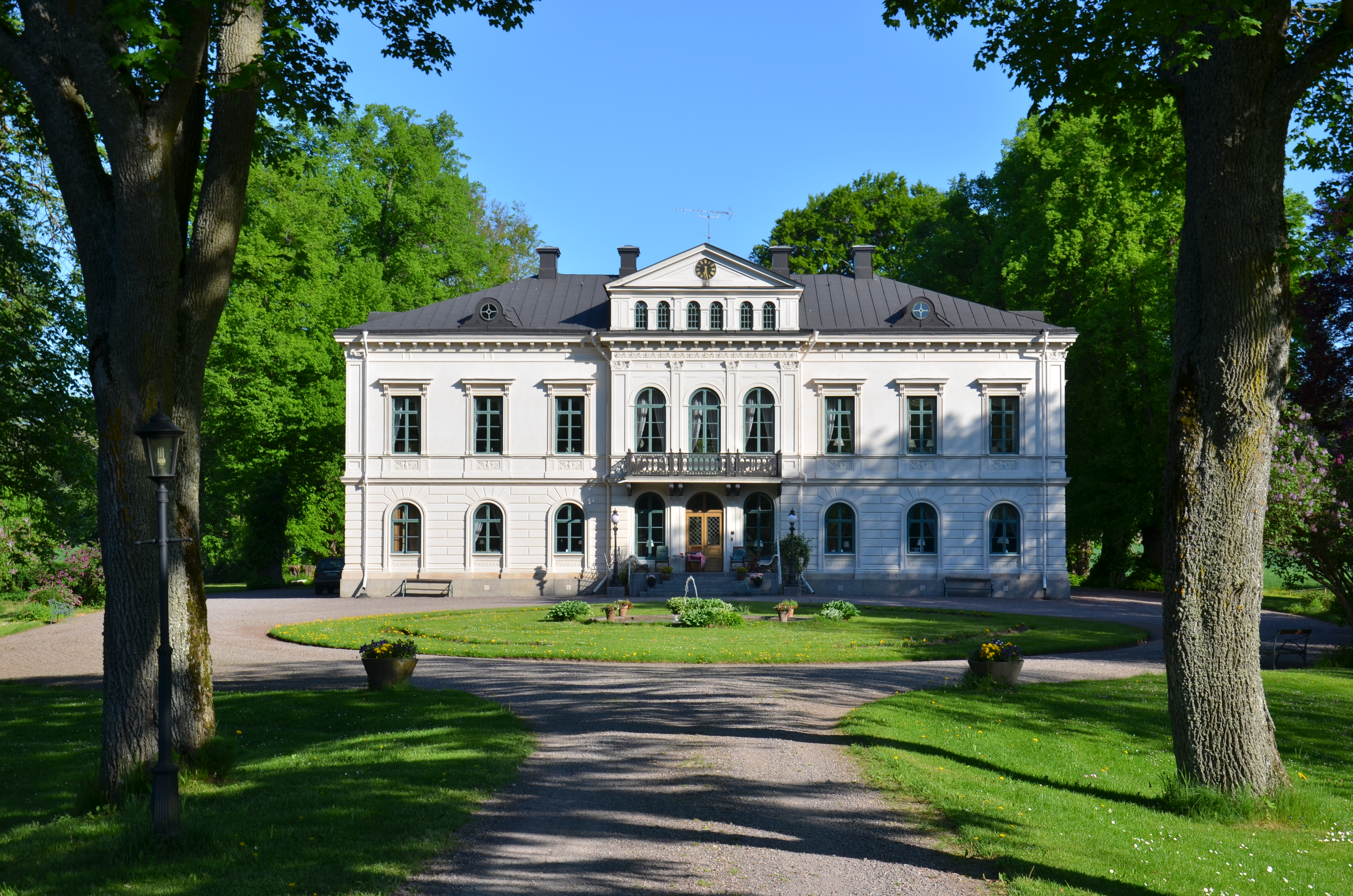
Manor House at Lyckås

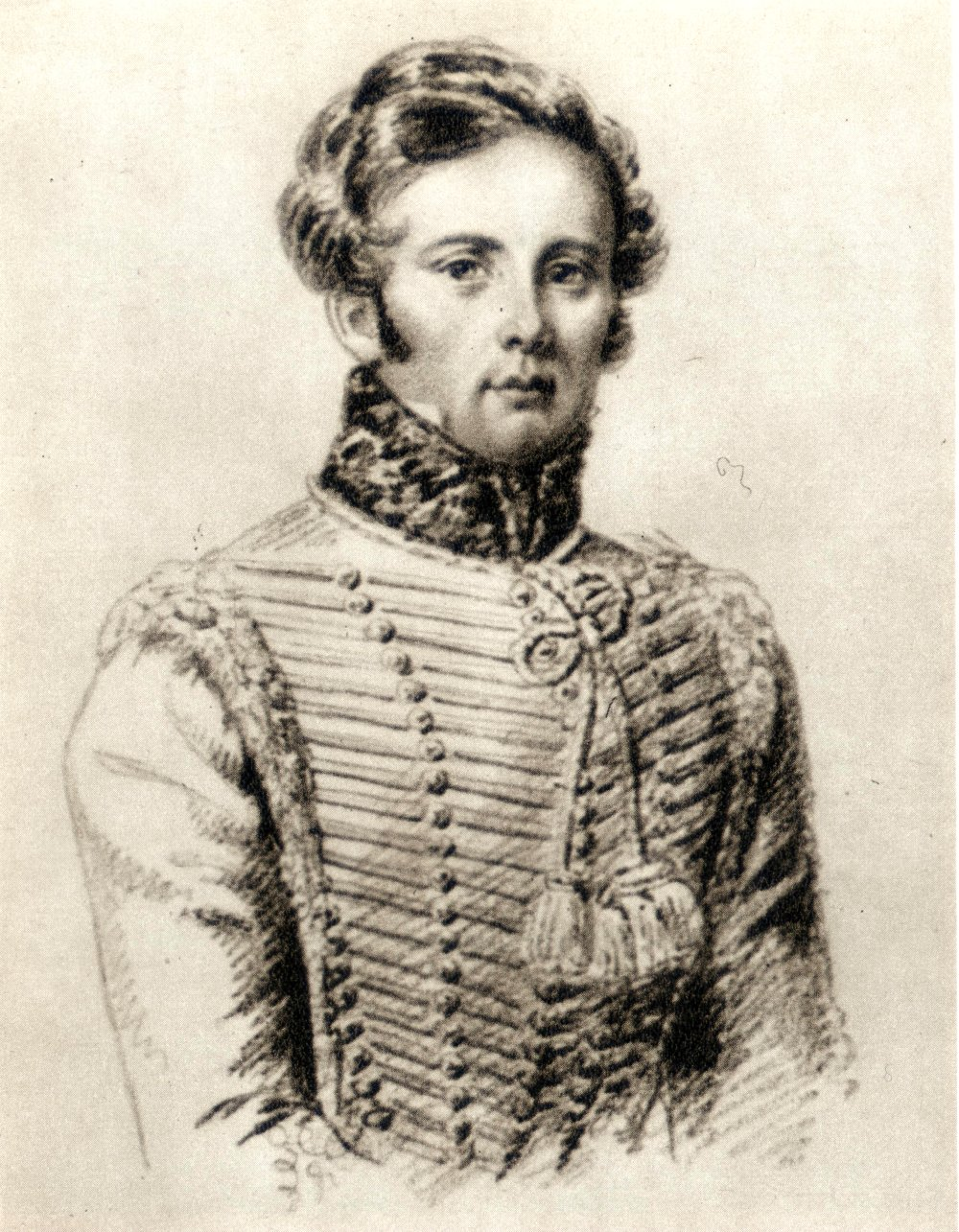
Lyckås Manor was built at the direction of Jakob Essen Hamilton

Lyckås is a manor house in Jönköping Municipality, Sweden.

== History ==
Lyckås was at the beginning of the 17th century part of the estate of Per Brahe the Younger and remained part of a larger estate until 1751. In that year it was sold to G. J. Horn af Rantzien. It has subsequently belonged to various Swedish aristocratic families. The current main building is a two-story Renaissance-style stone house, built in 1863 at the direction of Major General and Count Jakob Essen Hamilton (1797–1864) and Stefanie Fredrika Hamilton (1819–1894).
