= Gripenberg Castle =

Coordinates: 57°59′55″N 14°53′42″E

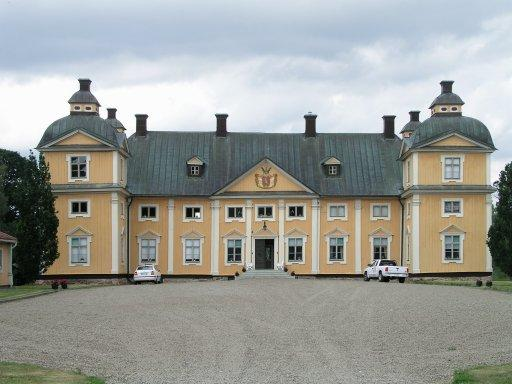
Gripenberg Castle

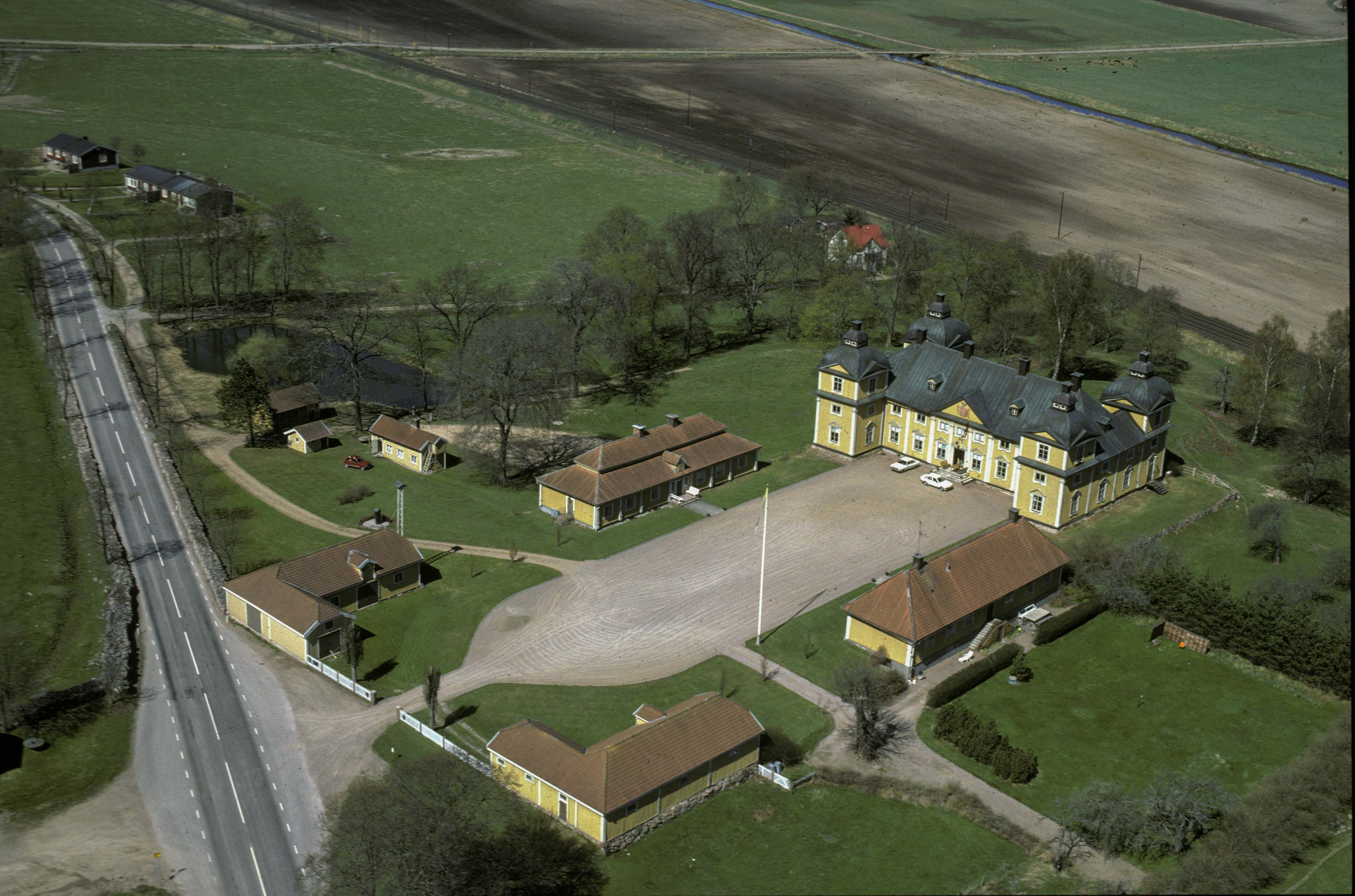
Gripenberg Castle, areal view

Gripenberg Castle (Swedish: Gripenbergs slott) is a wooden manor house near Tranås in Småland, Sweden. It is considered to be the biggest wooden castle in Sweden and one of the oldest that remain today as well.

== History ==
Gripenberg was built in 1663 as a hunting seat for the field marshal Carl Gustaf Wrangel (1613-1676). Its architect is unknown, but there is some reason to believe that it might have been Nicodemus Tessin the Elder. It is presumed that the castle's name is derived from the name of Wrangel's mother, Margareta Grip, and that Wrangel might have chosen it to commemorate her. By the end of the 18th century the manor was bought by Samuel von Söderling and today remains in the possession of members of his family.

The manor consists of a wide main length and tower buildings in the four corners. It was originally red in color with gray pilasters and shingles. Just before 1780, the red-colored main building was fitted with a board panel that was painted yellow. The facility includes eight one-story wings that house residences, warehouses and storerooms. The west wing with a manor roof was originally the main building on Mörbylund's manor but was moved here after the west wing burned down in the early 18th century and Mörbylund became a barn under Gripenberg.
