= Helliden Castle =

Manor in Västra Götaland County, Sweden

Coordinates: 58°10′26″N 13°58′44″E

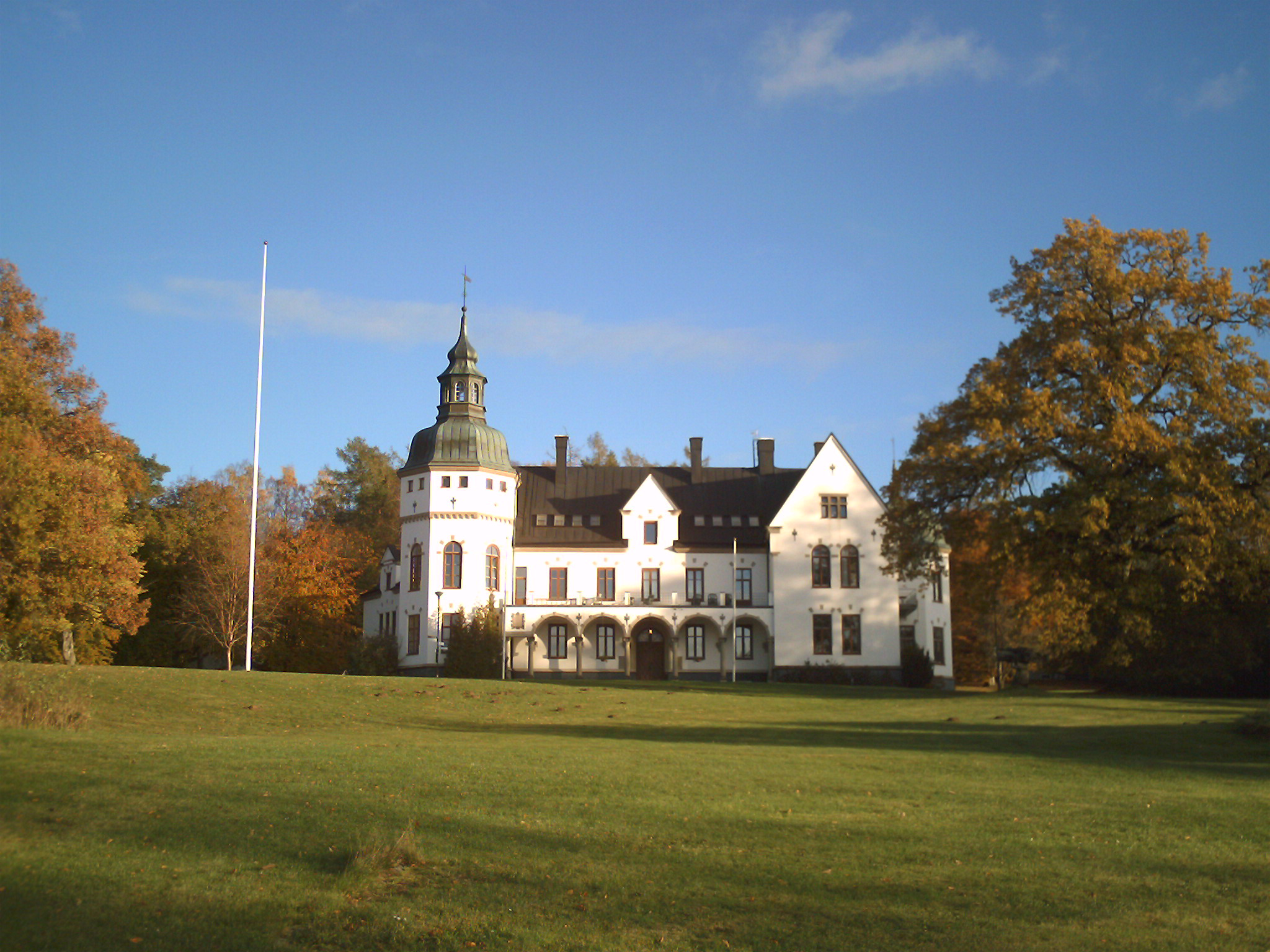
Helliden

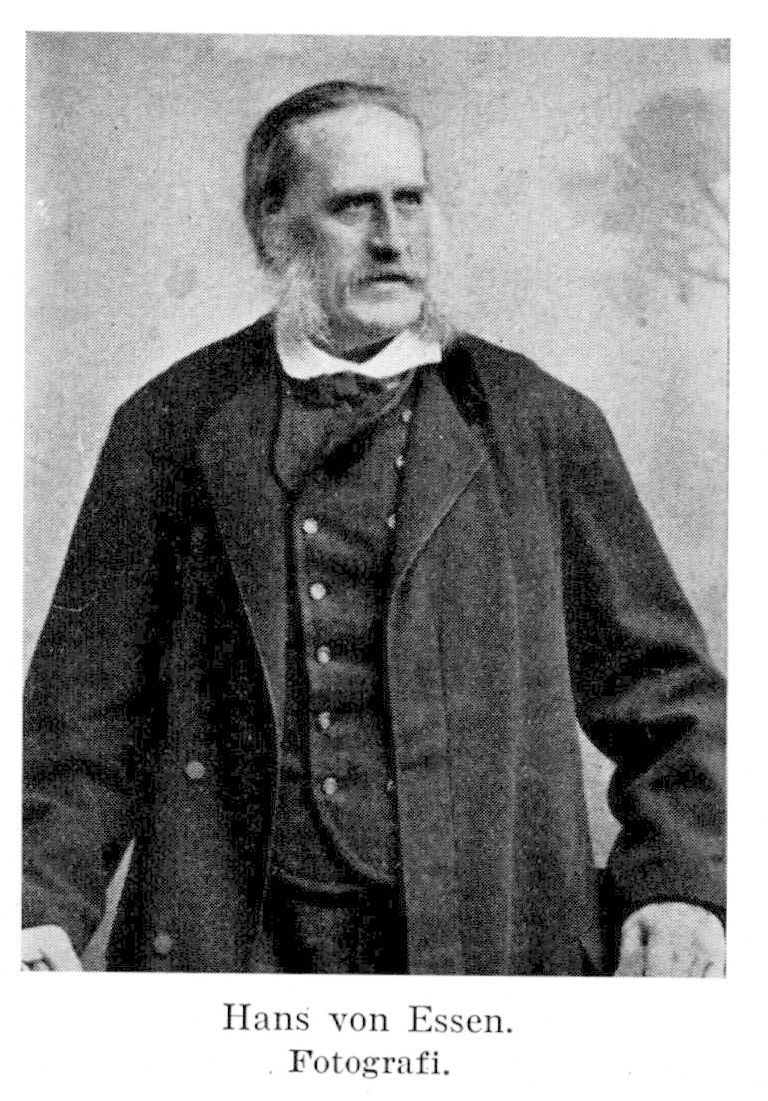

Helliden Castle (Hellidens slott) is a manor house at Tidaholm Municipality in Västra Götaland County, Sweden. Today it is the site of Helliden Folk High School (Hellidens Folkhögskola).

== History ==
Helliden was built in 1858 by Hans Henrik von Essen (1820–1894). von Essen was owner and operator of Tidaholms bruk which operated the manufacture of wagons and agricultural implements. From 1856 to 1866, he was CEO of the steel and forest industry company Hellefors Bruk. In 1868, he was involved in the formation of Tändsticksfabrik AB Vulcan in Tidaholm.
