= Gränsö Slott =

Castle in Sweden

Gränsö Castle
- Gränsö Slott
- Västervik, Sweden
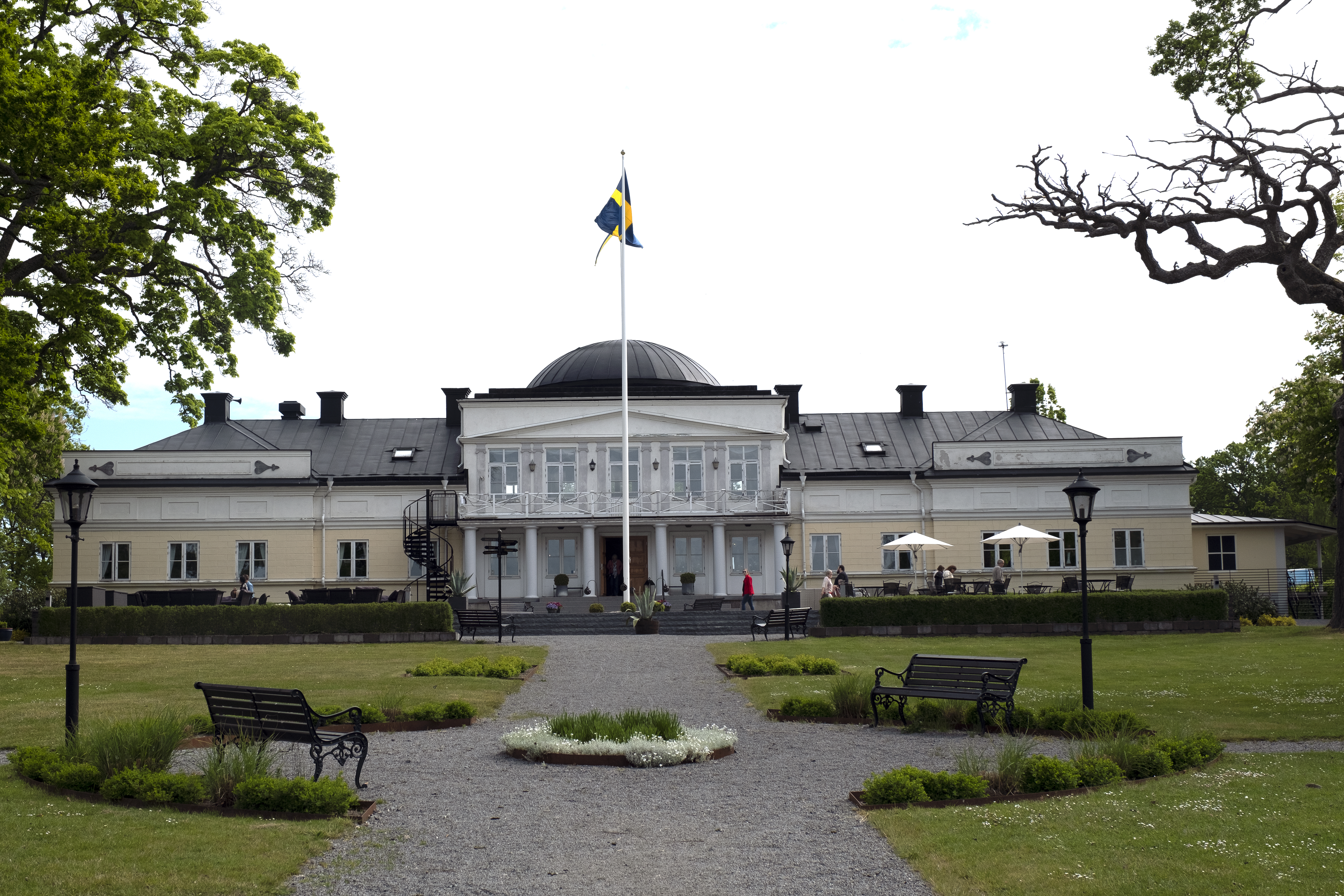
- Gränsö Slott in June 2022

Site information
- Type: Manor House
- Owner: Per Johansson
- Open to the public: Yes

Location
- Coordinates: 57°45′40″N 16°41′03″E

Site history
- Built: 1807
- Built by: Olof Johan Risselskiöld

Gränsö Slott (English: Gränsö Castle /ˈɡrænsoʊ/) is a manor house located near Västervik in Kalmar County, Sweden. Today, Gränsö is operated as a resort.

== History ==
The original building consisted of a main hall made in wood, which was built in 1807 by Olof Johan Risselskiöld. The castle was extended many times during the 19th century.

In 1992, the castle was subject to an extensive renovation. In 1993, when the renovation was nearly finished, a devastating fire destroyed the whole building. The castle was rebuilt again in 1994, in only four months.

Today, the building is classified as a resort and is privately owned by Per Johansson. Prior to Johansson, Robert Fleetwood was the last owner, within whose family Gränsö had been inherited since 1886.
