= Sävstaholm =

- Sweden
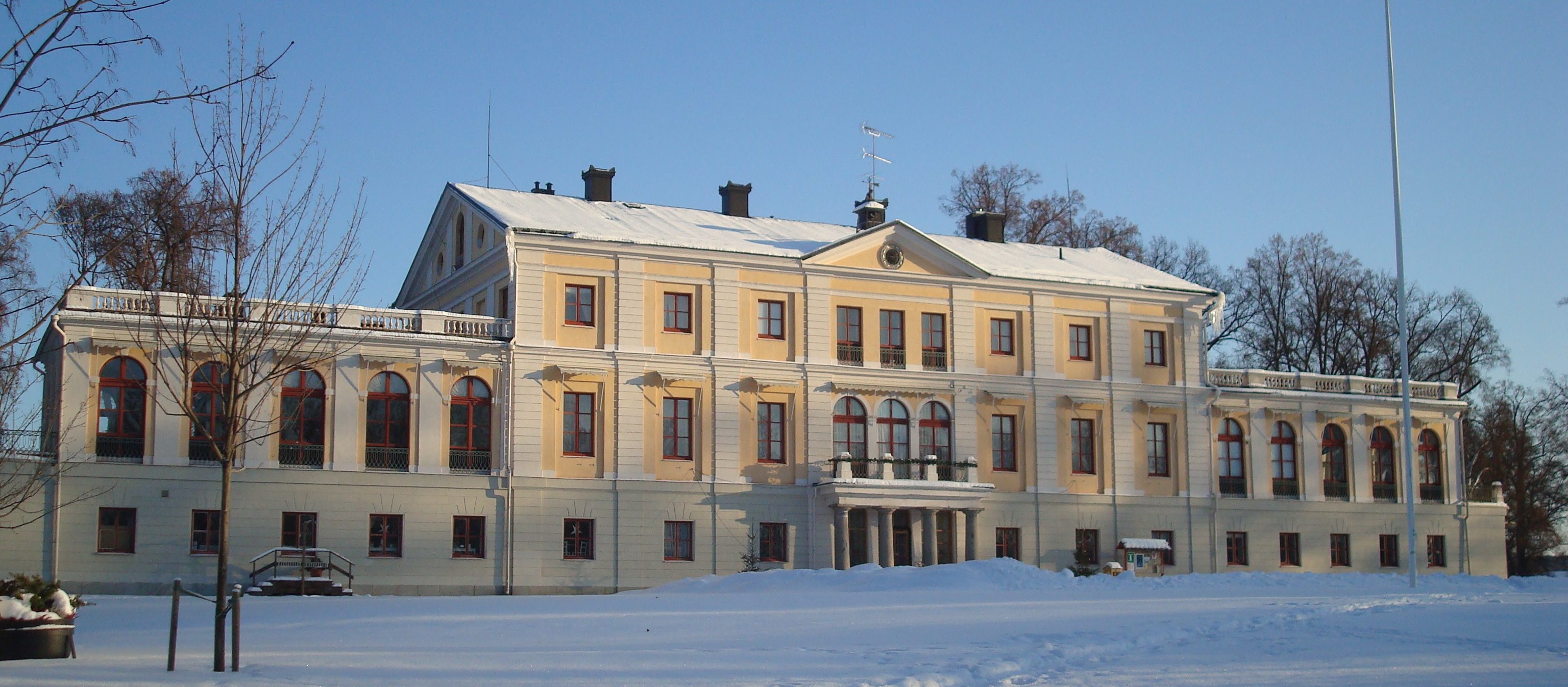

Site information
- Type: Castle

Location
- Coordinates: 59°02′46″N 15°52′56″E

Sävstaholm Castle (Sävstaholms slott) is a castle in Vingåker Municipality, Södermanland County, Sweden. The name is sometimes spelled Säfstaholm, which is according to old Swedish spelling rules.

== History ==
The palace was built during 1666 by Gustav Larsson Sparre (1625-1689), a Swedish baron, diplomat, and governor. Since 1968, it has been owned by Vingåker Municipality.

== See also ==
- List of castles in Sweden

== Other sources ==
- Furborg, Lars (1994) En konstepok på Säfstaholm 1797-1855 (Vingåkers kommun) ISBN 91-972059-1-5
