= Haddebo Bruk =

Estate in Sweden

- Hallsberg Municipality, Sweden
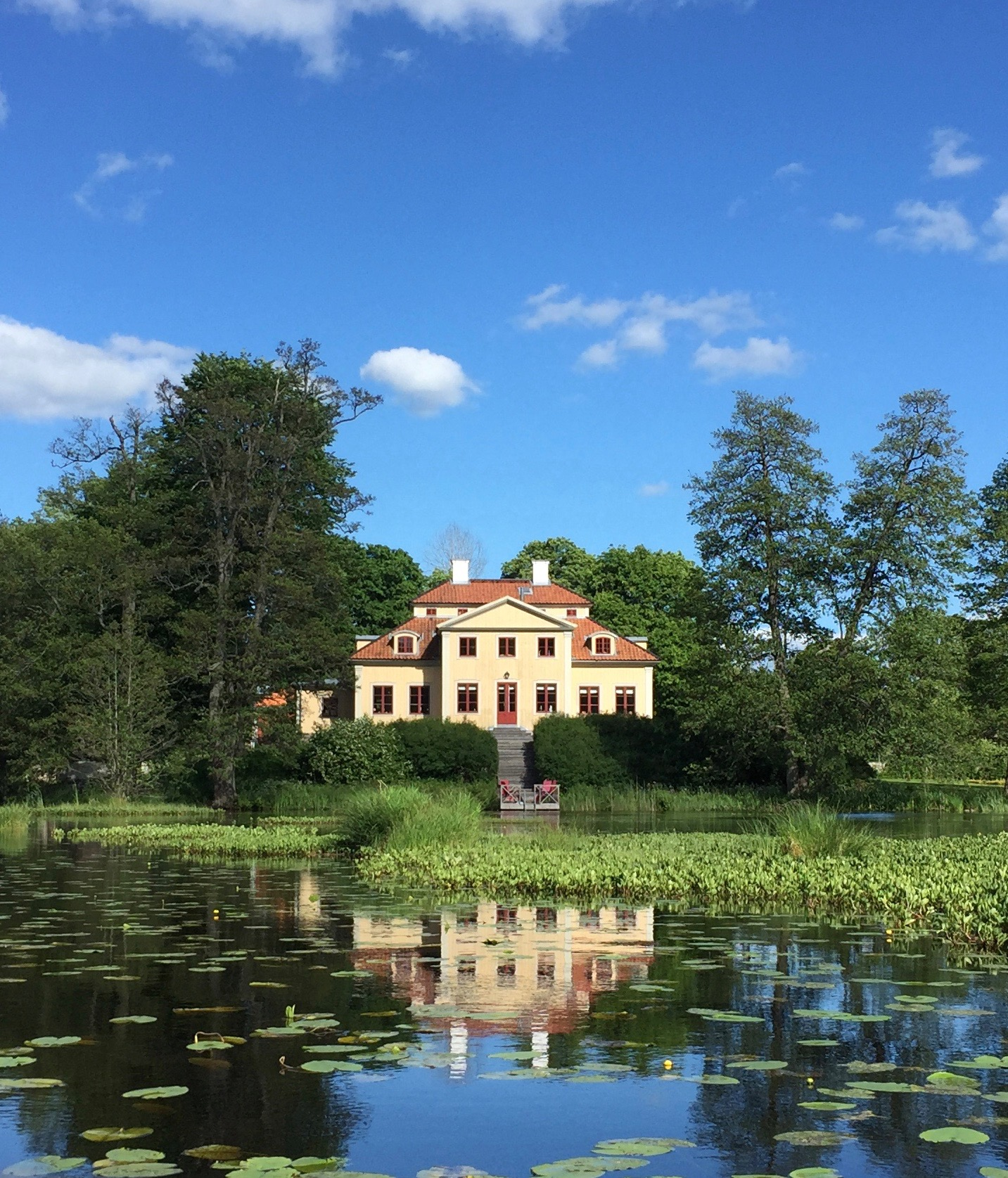

Site information
- Type: Manor House

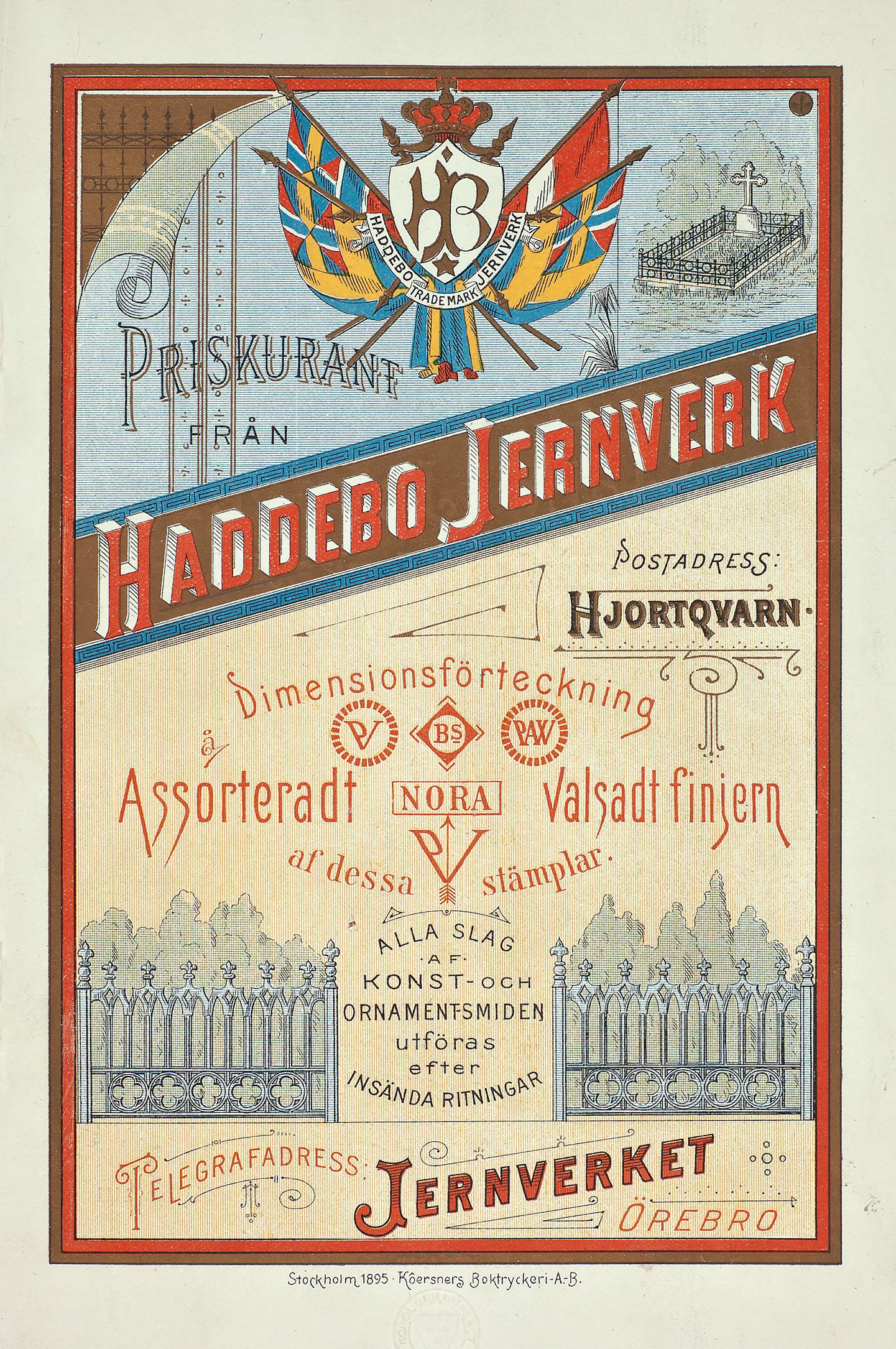
A 19th century brochure from Haddebo bruk.

Haddebo Bruk is a Swedish ironworks estate from the 17th century, situated in the village of Haddebo in the southern part of Närke. To the estate belonged two manor houses, the "lower Haddebo" and the "upper Haddebo". Both of the original manor houses are gone, however a replica of the upper Haddebo Manor has been rebuilt according to the original renderings preserved in the Nordic Museum, during the 1990s.

== History ==
Haddebo was first mentioned as "Haddeboda" in a "tiondelängd" (a Swedish historical listing of farming estates) in 1555, and in a tax document from 1592. The first map of the region was published in 1637, shortly after which, in 1658 Jacob Classon from Norrköping received rights to start an iron works at Haddebo. Upon Classon's death in 1666, the estate was sold to Mathias Schilt, who after a few years sold Haddebo to the freeman Peder Andersson Wester. Wester had great ambitions for the estate and managed to greatly expand Haddebo's lands as well as production output. In the late 17th century he had the manor house "Lower Haddebo" built.

Wester died at the end of the 17th century, which resulted in a split of the estate into Lower and Upper Haddebo when the inheritance was settled in 1703. The estate of Upper Haddebo built a manor house in the typically Swedish "karoliner" style in the early 18th century. The estates at Haddebo were very productive, producing energy by damming up the surrounding lakes, and producing cast iron. Both the estates stayed in the Wester family for well over a century until the widow of Arvid Wester, sold Lower Haddebo in 1821, and Upper Haddebo in 1826.

During the 19th century, the estates frequently changed hands, and belonged to the families Broms and Floor. Lower Haddebo was in 1862 acquired by Per Fredrik Brandelius, a wealthy brewer from Stockholm. Brandelius also owned Lemnå Bruk, and went on to found Örebro Enskilda Bank (Örebro Private Bank) in the nearby city of Örebro. Furthermore, Brandelius was the great-grandfather of the Swedish diplomat and author Jan Mårtenson.

Both of the estates in Haddebo were acquired by the Swedish state in 1900 and 1902, and became official royal hunting grounds. King Gustaf V of Sweden was very fond of hunting Moose at Haddebo and visited the estate almost every year. To this day the forests which surround Haddebo remain royal hunting grounds, and Prince Carl Philip, shot his first Moose on the grounds in 2002.

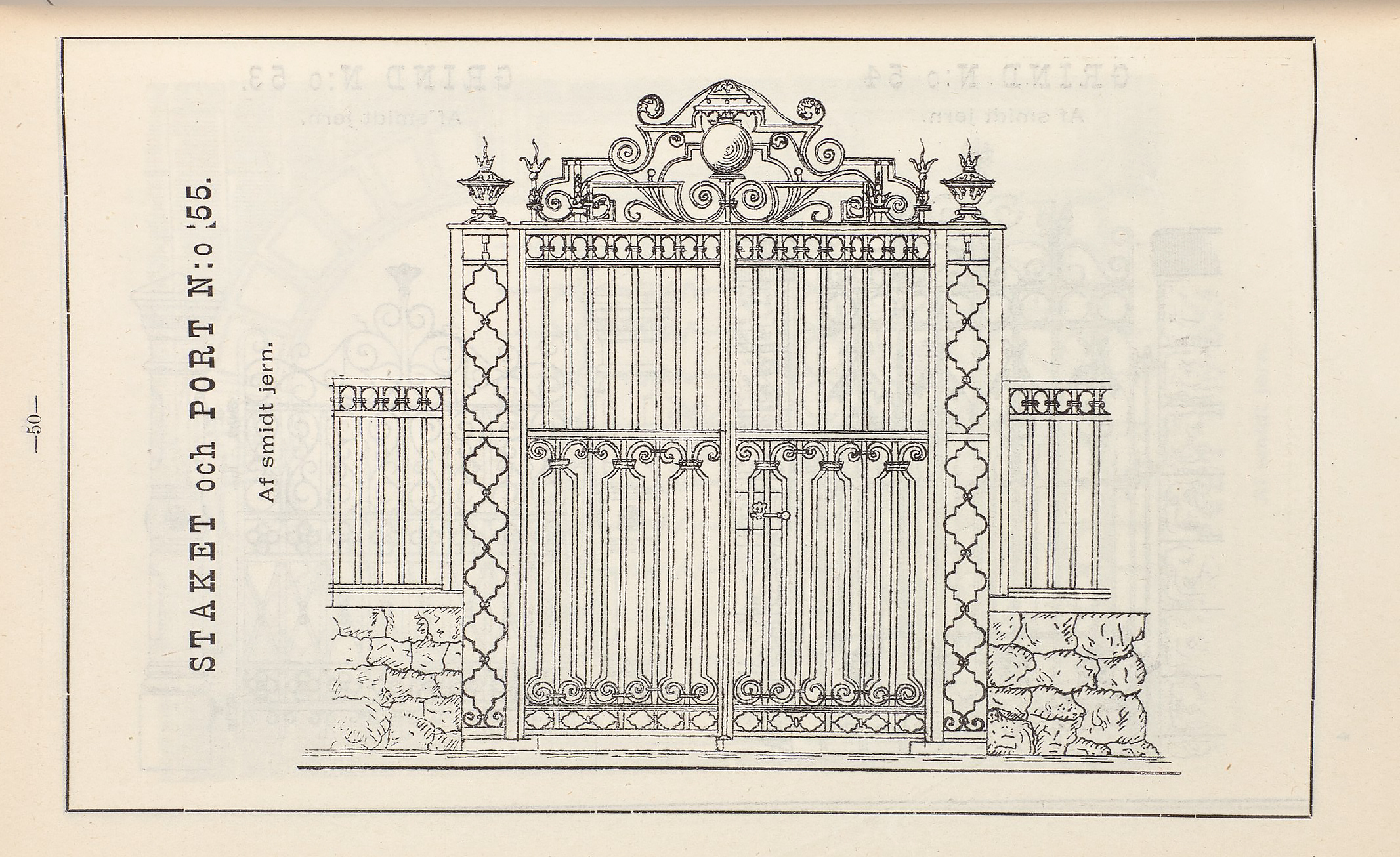
Gates produced at the Haddebo ironworks in the late 19th century.

The buildings at Haddebo suffered greatly during state ownership and both the Manor Houses of Upper and Lower Haddebo perished, Upper Haddebo in a fire 1938 and Lower Haddebo was demolished by the state in 1941. The forestry continued, and so did the electricity production in the dams up until 1965. In the 1970s and 80s the estate faced further decline, up until 1989 when it was acquired by the Hemberg family. The Hemberg's proceeded to begin a major restoration project. The original renderings of Upper Haddebo could be recovered from the Nordic Museum, and at the place of Lower Haddebo a copy of the manor house of Upper Haddebo was built. Old material, such as timber, windows and doors from several other 18th century timber houses, which were to be demolished, were used for the project. The house was built with techniques used when the original house was constructed to create an image as accurate as possible of the original manor house. The estate remains in the Hemberg family as a private residence.

In addition to forestry and farming, the estate features a notable stud "Haddebo Seminstation" since 2003, led by Dr. Elisabeth Hemberg.

== The village of Haddebo ==
Surrounding the estate is the small village of Haddebo, which is the home of the notable Swedish author Torbjörn Säfve. The village also features a botanical garden "Haddebo Gärdesgård och Blommor", and a B&B "Vita Kralan".
