= Löderup Church =

- Löderups kyrka
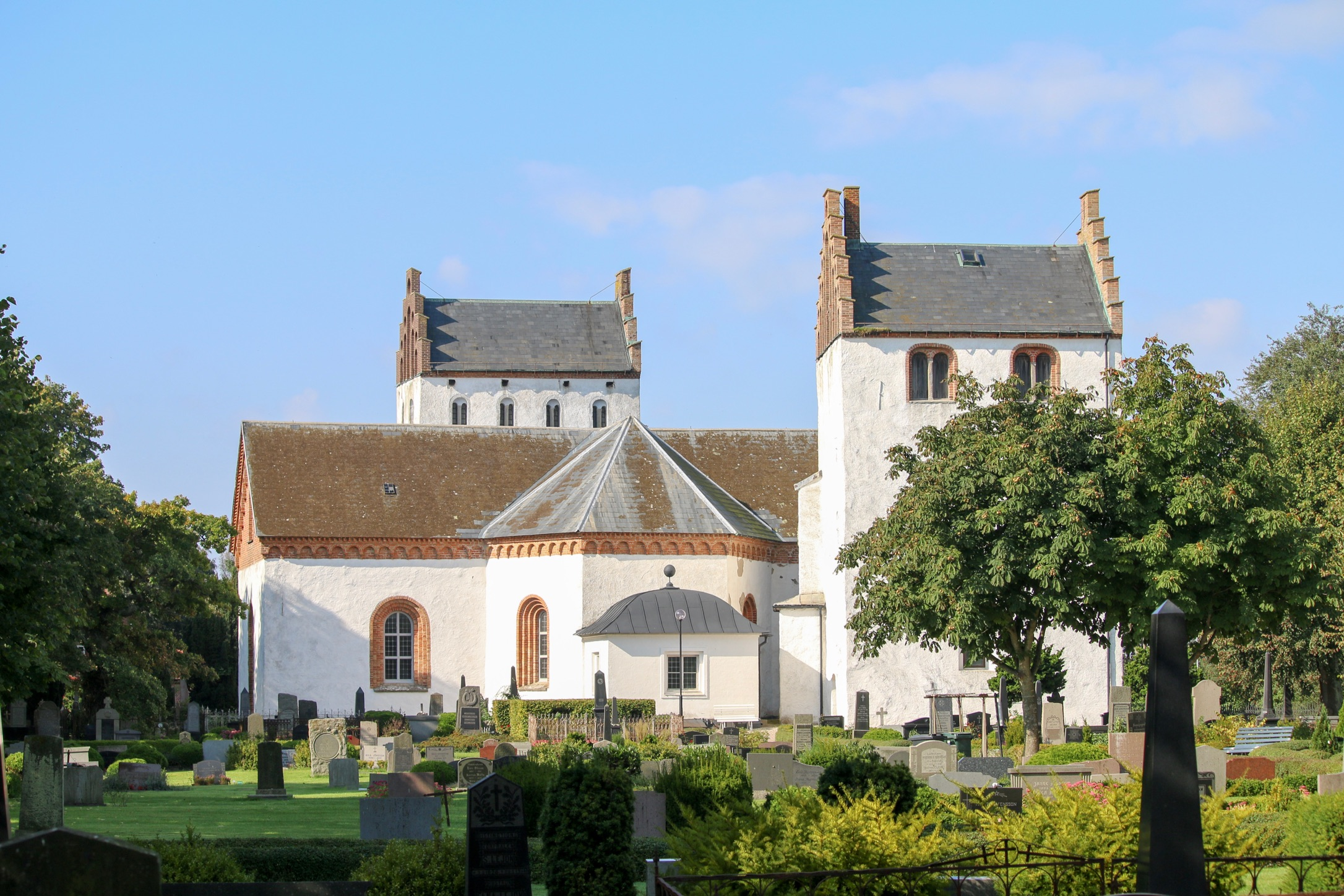
- Löderup Church

- 55°25′41″N 14°06′39″E
- Country: Sweden
- Denomination: Church of Sweden

Löderup Church (Swedish: Löderups kyrka) is a medieval church in Löderup, Ystad Municipality, in the province of Skåne, Sweden. Dating from the 12th century, it has subsequently been expanded and rebuilt, not least under the guidance of architect Carl Georg Brunius in the 1860s. The church contains several old furnishings, including an unusual 12th-century baptismal font.

== History ==
The church was erected in the middle of the 12th century. Originally, it featured a broad western tower, a nave, choir and an apse. During the 14th century a church porch was added to the north, and in the following century, another church porch was added in front of the south entrance. Concurrently, in the 15th century an adjacent tower, a so-called kastal was erected nearby, likely serving a defensive function. During the same century, the interior of the church underwent alterations, with new vaults constructed, possibly decorated with murals initially. Unfortunately, in the 18th century, these vaults partially collapsed.

In 1862 and 1863, Carl Georg Brunius led a substantial reconstruction of the church. Transepts were added in the north and south, while the choir and apse were demolished, replaced by a triangular chancel. All the church walls were heightened, with the new sections constructed of brick, and crow-stepped gables were added to the tower and kastal. In 1897, new windows and a gallery for the church organ were installed according to designs by architect Theodor Wåhlin. Additionally, a sacristy was added in 1929.

== Architecture and furnishings ==
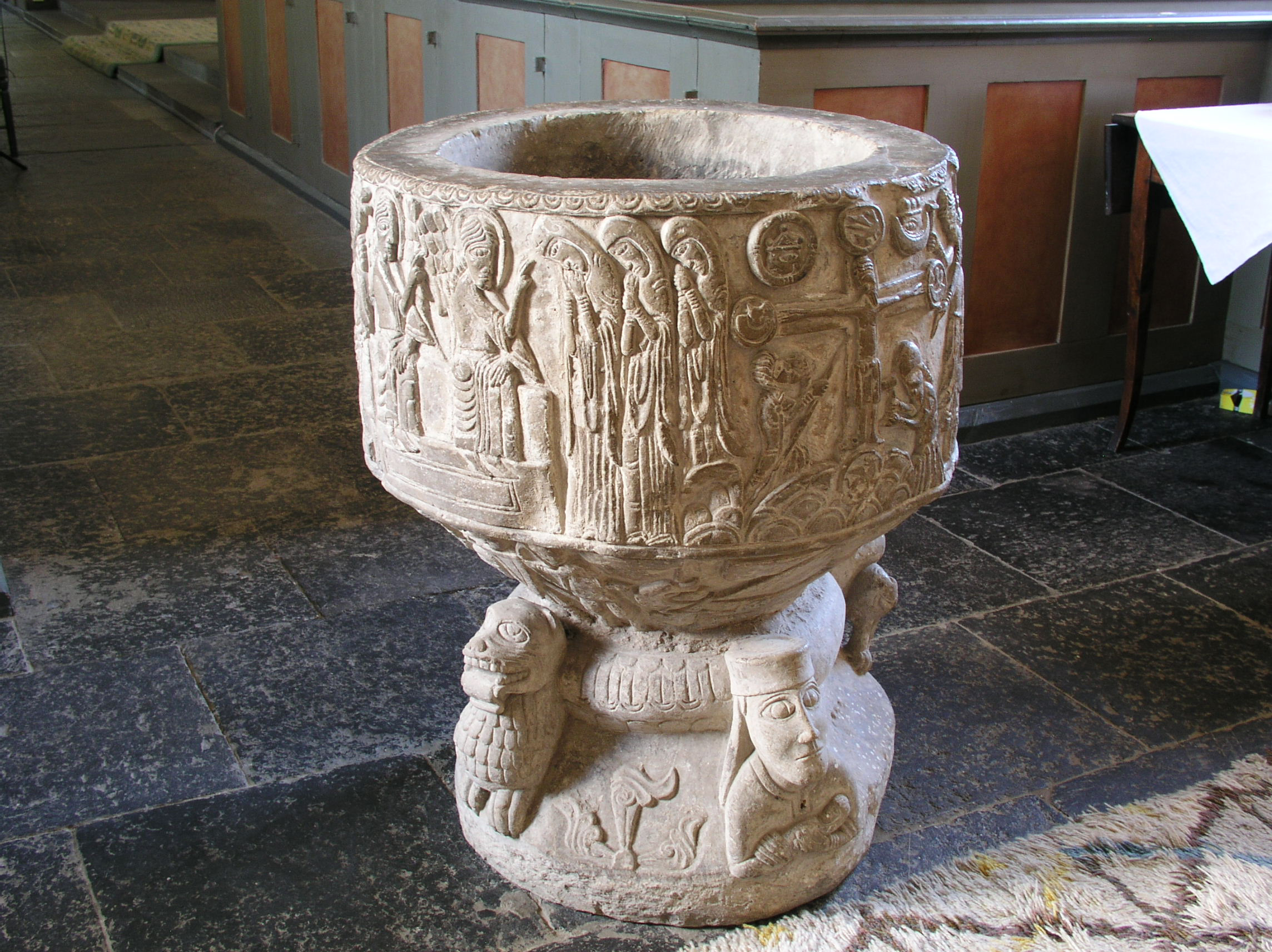
The baptismal font of the church

The oldest parts of the church are the tower and the nave. The ground floor of the tower is supported by a barrel vault and open to the nave.

The baptismal font of the church has been described as one of the most unusual fonts in Scania. The sandstone font dates from around 1160 and is richly decorated with sculpted depictions of the Passion of Jesus and the resurrection. The foot of the font contains depictions of battles, including a ship with a dragon's head at the stem, similar to older Viking ships. The decoration on the foot may depict the Battle of Stiklestad and the martyrdom of Saint Olaf, and if so is the oldest known depiction of the legend of Saint Olaf in the Nordic countries. It was made by the sculptor known by a notname as Majestatis.

Another 12th-century object originally from Löderup Church is a decorated burial monument, depicting lions and human figures on the slab. It is today housed in the Swedish History Museum in Stockholm. A ruined, medieval door is also preserved in the church porch. Legend holds that it was destroyed by the men of Jens Grim, a knight and member of the Council of the Realm, who had been excommunicated by the priest of Löderup Church for having pillaged the parish. Grim's men went to the church, smashed the door and killed the priest, according to this tradition; a large oak tree then grew on the grave of the priest adjacent to the church.

The church contains three altarpieces; the main altarpiece dates from 1878 and is dominated by a painting by Danish artist Carl Bloch. In addition, the church also has an altarpiece from 1735 and one from c. 1600; the latter is made by sculptor Jacob Kremberg. The same sculptor also decorated the pulpit, which dates from 1604 and is in a late Renaissance style. It carries the coat of arms of king Christian IV of Denmark and queen Anne Catherine of Brandenburg (the province of Skåne only became Swedish in 1658 following the Treaty of Roskilde).
