= Liberiet =

Historical building in Lund, Sweden

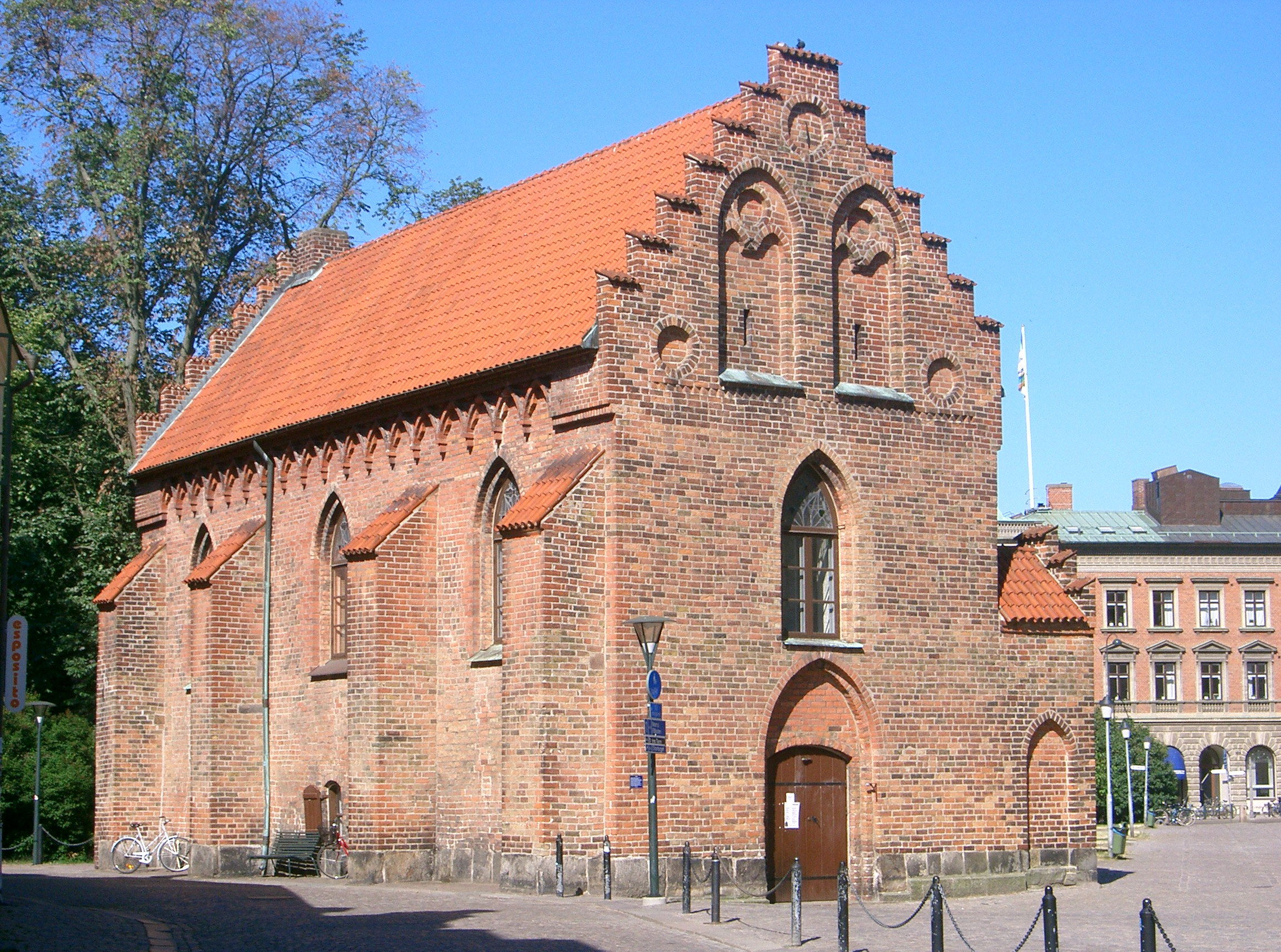
- Liberiet, a medieval brick building, next to the Lund Cathedral
- Interactive map of the Liberiet area

General information
- Architectural style: Brick Gothic
- Location: Kyrkogatan 4, Lund
- Coordinates: 55°42′13.1″N 13°11′38.1″E
- Year built: 15th century

Website
- Liberiet

Liberiet is a building in central Lund, Sweden, just south of Lund Cathedral. Originally used as a library, the building was built in the 15th century. Today it serves as a pilgrimage center.

== History ==
The building has a long history linked to the Cathedral, but we do not know exactly when it was built; it is estimated to have been constructed during the second half of the 15th century. At that time, the Liberiet building served as the cathedral chapter’s library. The name comes from the Danish word “liberi,” meaning “collection of books” or library. This is the only one of all the buildings that surrounded the Cathedral in the Middle Ages that remains today. After the university was founded in 1668, the building was taken over that same year and was then used by the Faculty of Philosophy as a classroom. For a long time afterward, the building was known as the Old Academy.

In 1765, a fencing hall was established on the upper floor. Among others, Pehr Henrik Ling taught students fencing and gymnastics here in the early 1800s.

=== Renovation ===
In 1843, C. G. Brunius oversaw a fairly extensive renovation of the Liberiet, which included new windows and the conversion of the fencing hall into a rehearsal hall for the Academic Music Corps.

From 1890 until 1966, the building served as the boiler room for the Cathedral. In 1979, a renovation was carried out under the direction of Ove Hidemark from the Swedish National Heritage Board, after which the building served as a parish hall for the Cathedral Parish and eventually as a pilgrim center.

Starting in 2015, the Liberiet underwent a comprehensive renovation, in part to stabilize the structure.

Accessibility has been improved through the installation of a wheelchair lift and an accessible restroom.

Today, it is a center for spiritual reflection and a pilgrimage center in the Diocese of Lund.

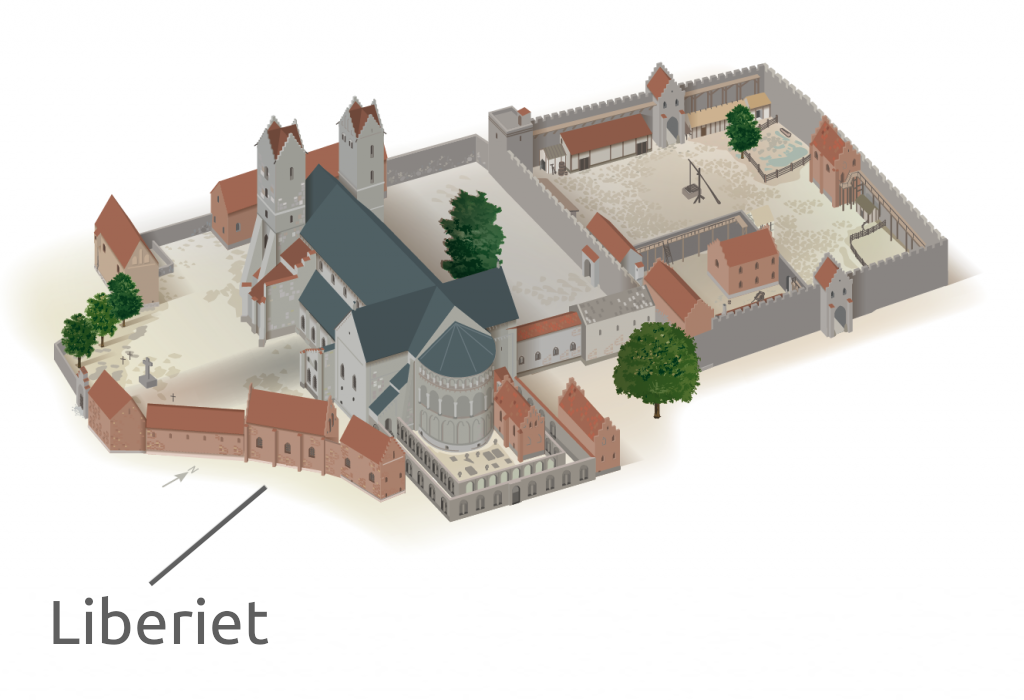
The Liberiet building was once part of the Lundagård castle. This is its appearance around AD1500. Reconstruction by the Department of Archaeology, Lund University.

== Gallery ==
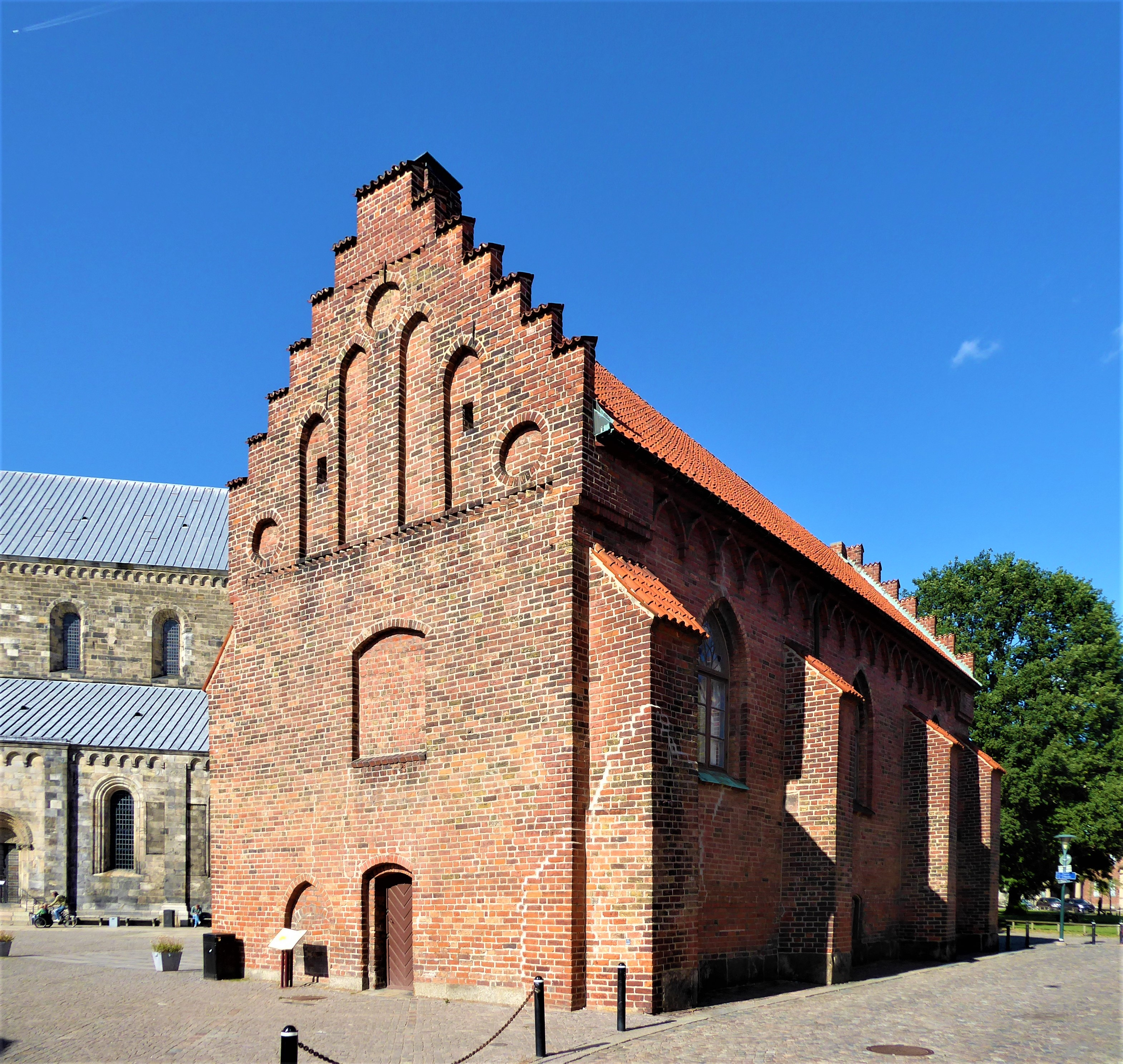
Liberiet

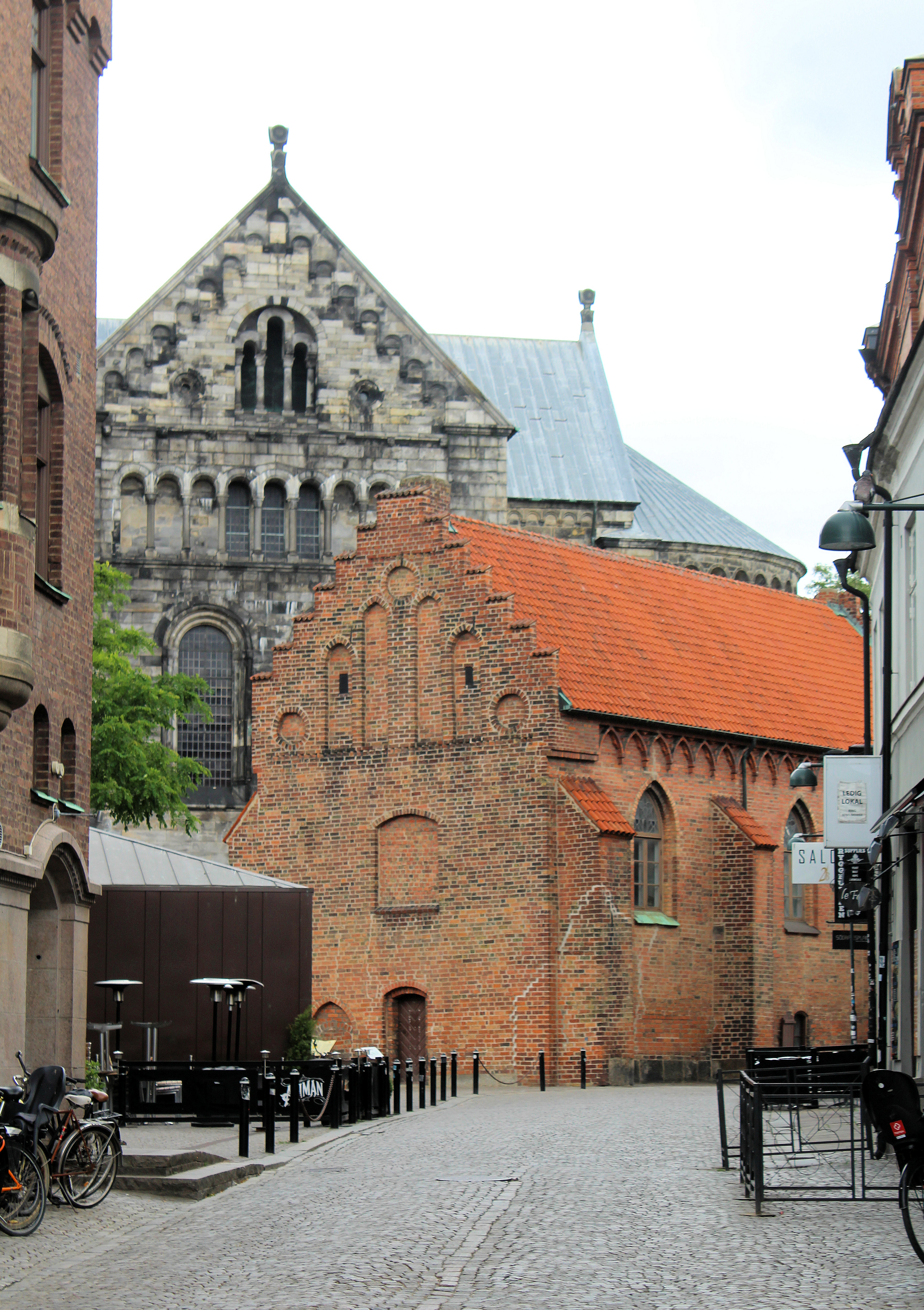
The Kungsgatan street
