= Dalköpinge Church =

- Dalköpinge kyrka
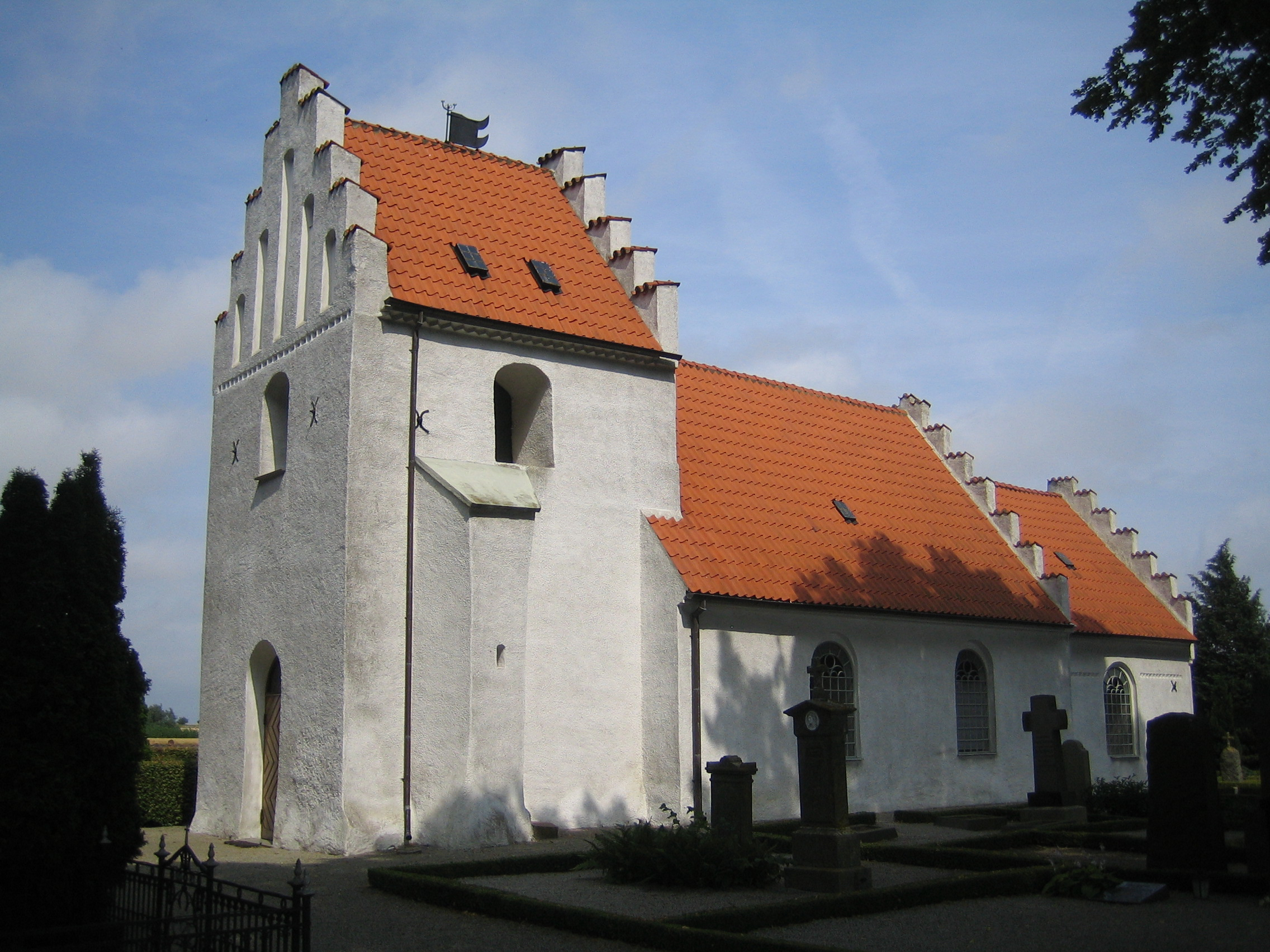
- Dalköpinge Church

- 55°22′45″N 13°13′06″E
- Country: Sweden
- Denomination: Church of Sweden

Administration
- Diocese: Lund

Dalköpinge Church (Swedish: Dalköpinge kyrka) is a medieval Lutheran church in Dalköpinge, slightly north-east of Trelleborg, Sweden. It belongs to the Diocese of Lund.

== History and architecture ==
Dalköpinge Church was built during the 13th century, and was one of the earliest brick churches in the area. It was probably built slightly after the city church of nearby Trelleborg, which was erected in 1275. During the 19th century, it was scheduled for demolition as it had become too small for the congregation, but was saved thanks to the intervention of Carl Georg Brunius and the members of the congregation themselves. The church is Romanesque in style. The exterior is whitewashed, while the interior is partially decorated with the remains of murals dating from the 13th to 15th centuries. The murals were discovered and restored during a renovation in 1937. The church has a pulpit from the 16th century, restored to its original colours in 1954. The triumphal cross, dating from the 13th century, has been somewhat altered later, while the 13th-century baptismal font is of the same age as the church. The altarpiece is also from the 16th century.
