= Västra Vemmerlöv Church =

- Västra Vemmerlövs kyrka
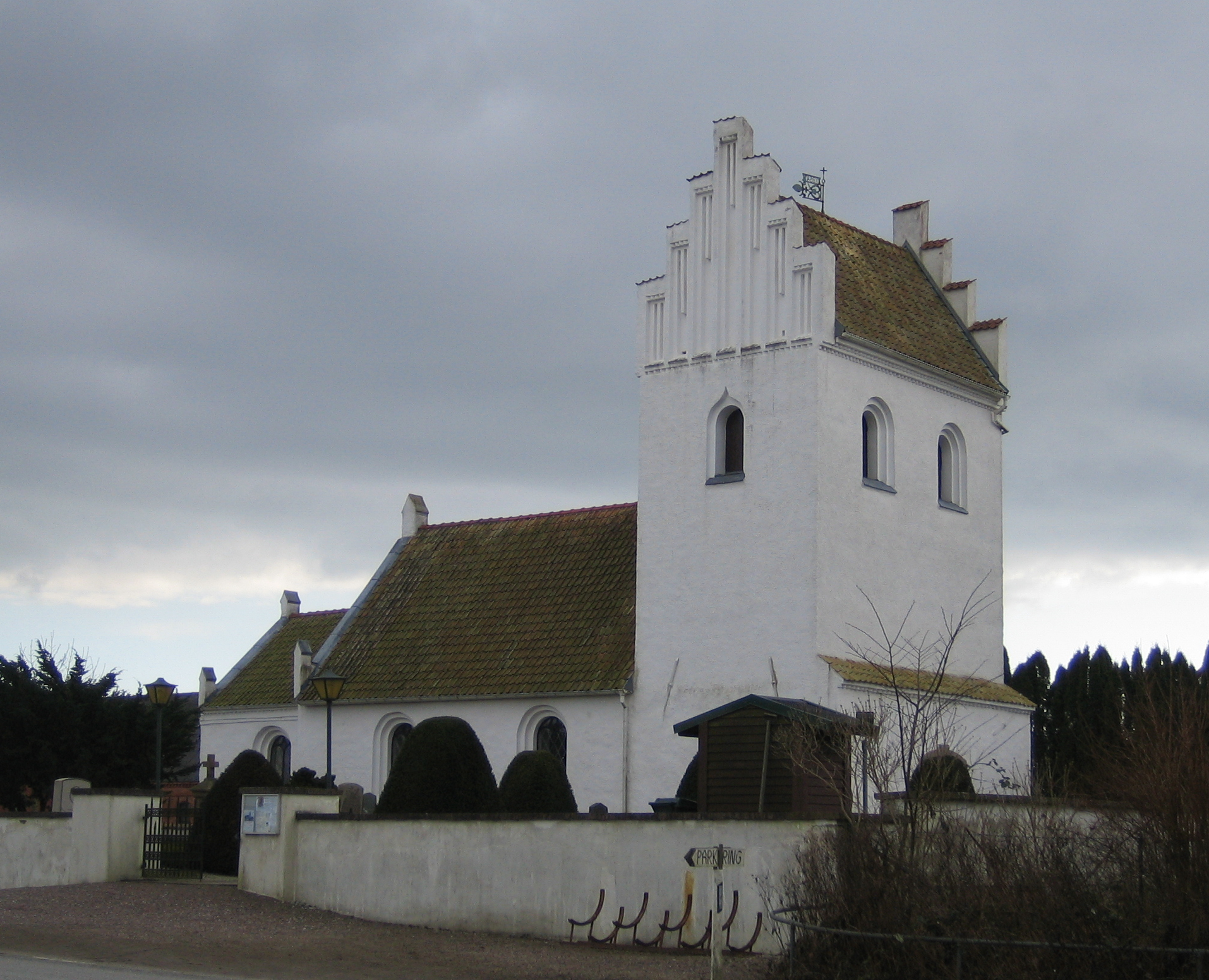
- Västra Vemmerlöv Church

- 55°24′50″N 13°09′39″E
- Country: Sweden
- Denomination: Church of Sweden

Västra Vemmerlöv Church (Swedish: Västra Vemmerlövs kyrka) is a medieval church in Trelleborg Municipality, Scania, Sweden. It belongs to the Church of Sweden. The church was built during the 12th century, but substantially altered in the 19th century. It still contains several medieval murals and a baptismal font from the time when it was built.

== History ==
The church dates from the 12th century, when its nave with two portals (north and south), a chancel without an apse and a broad western tower were built. It was possibly constructed by Oxiemästaren, a pupil of Mårten Stenmästare who in turn had been educated at the building site of Lund Cathedral. Later during the Middle Ages, a church porch was erected (later demolished). Inside, the church was also equipped with new brick vaults. In 1853–54, the church was heavily rebuilt to plans by Carl Georg Brunius. The tower was made higher and its current crow-stepped gables added. Inside, the medieval vaults were all but demolished and replaced with a wooden ceiling, itself replaced with the current barrel vault in 1868.

== Murals and furnishings ==
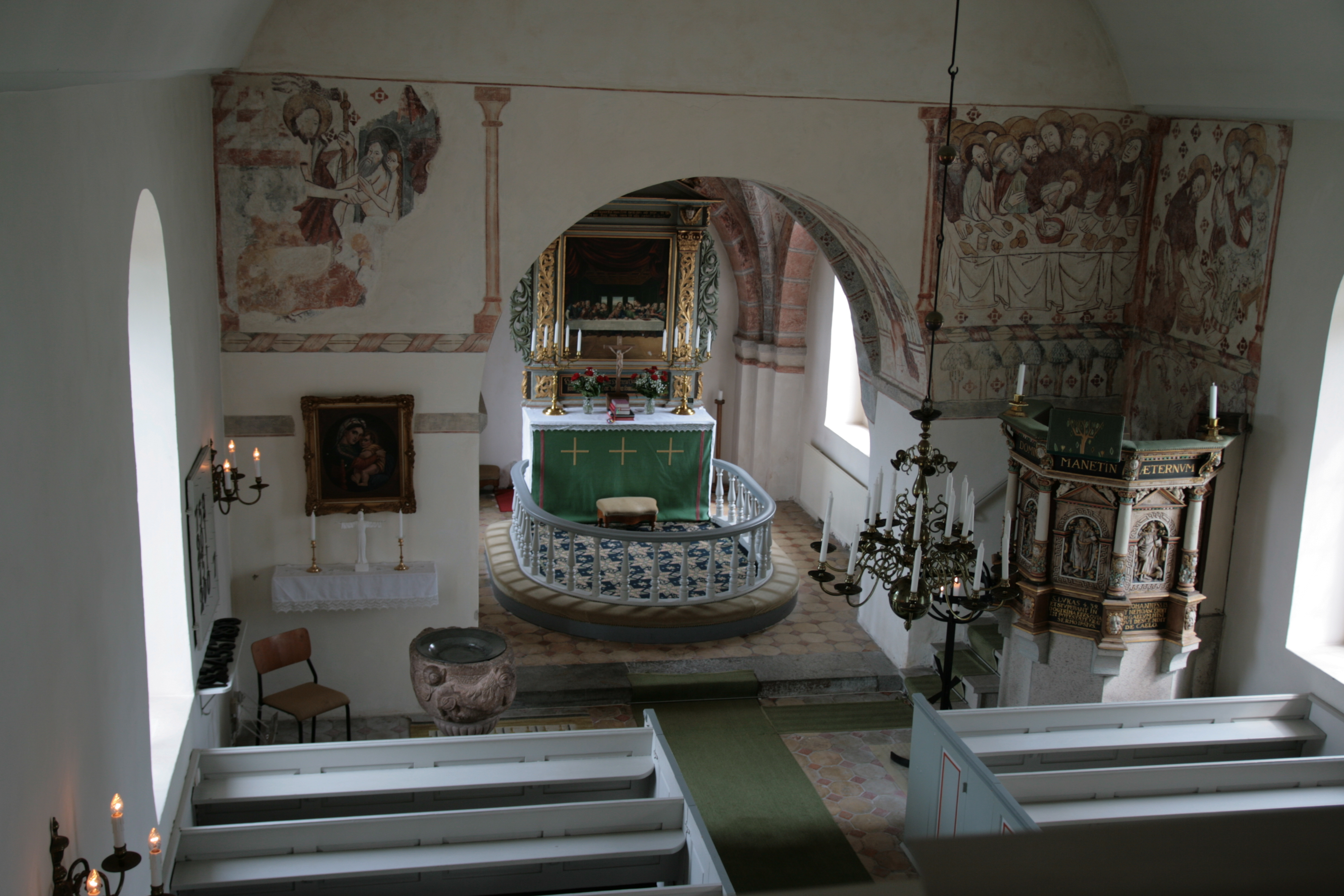
View towards the chancel

Despite its reconstruction in the 19th century, the church still retains several medieval murals. The vaults in the chancel date from the second half of the 15th century, and depict the Last Judgment, and a row of apostles. The wall separating the nave from the chancel also has partially preserved murals, older than those in the chancel and dating from the first half of the 15th century. They depict several scenes from the life of Christ, including the Last Supper and the Annunciation. Lastly there is also a set of murals decorating the vaults of the tower. These are from the 1520s and are more anecdotal, showing fables with religious overtones, including a scene of two foxed preaching for a flock of geese, an allegorical criticism of Lutheranism, which was gathering support at the time.

The altarpiece of the church is a work from the 18th century, which incorporates an 1860s copy of The Last Supper by Leonardo da Vinci. The pulpit dates from 1605, and the baptismal font is the oldest item in the church, from the time of its construction. It is decorated with reliefs depicting two lions and two heads of monsters.
