= Lundagård =

Lundagård may refer to:

- Lundagård (park), in central Lund, Sweden
- Lundagård (newspaper), published by the Lund University Student Union
- Lundagård (castle), medieval castle owned by the Archbishop of Lund
