= Caroline Jönsson =

Swedish footballer

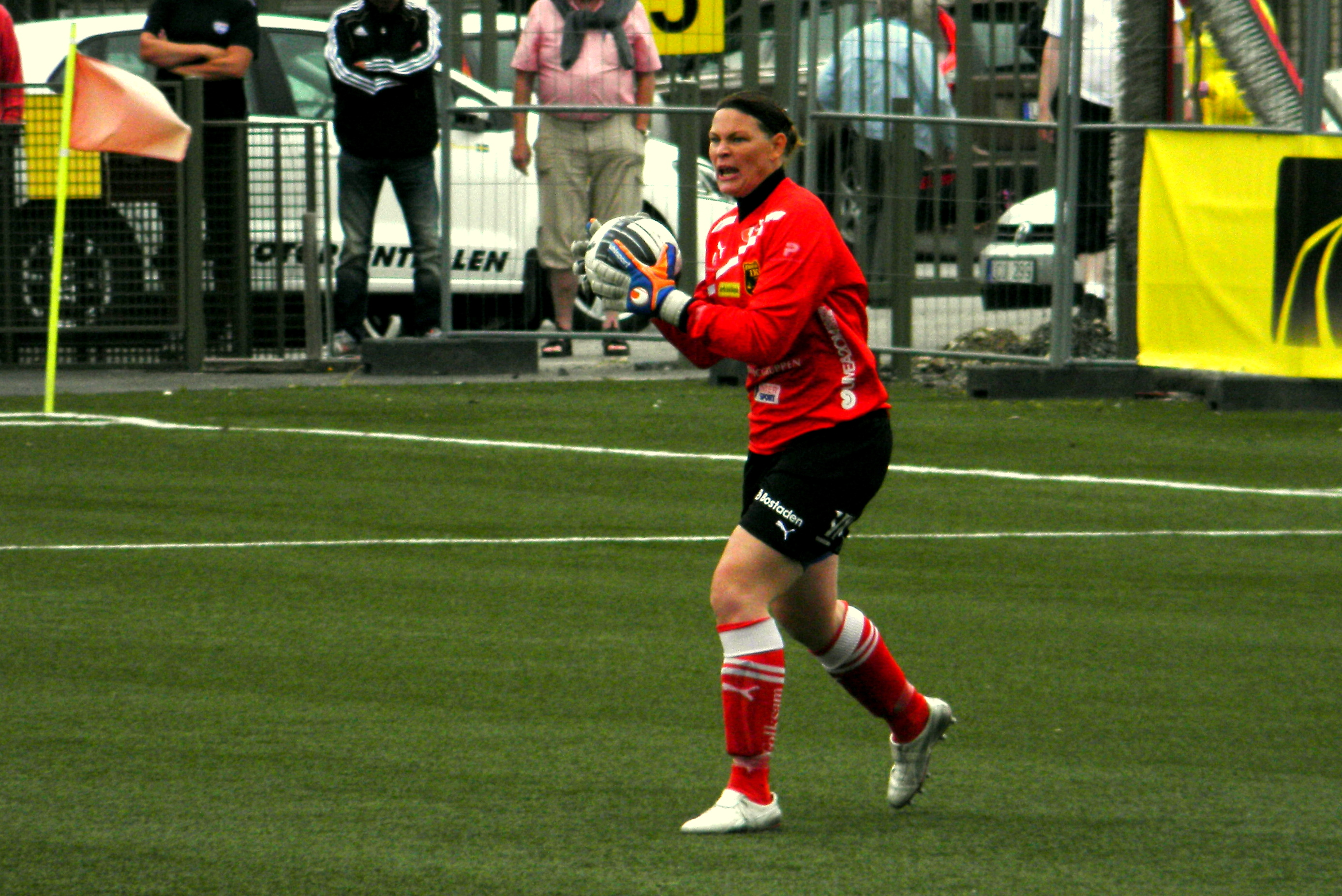
- Caroline Jönsson on 24 July 2011

Personal information
- Full name: Elin Hanna Caroline Jönsson
- Date of birth: 22 November 1977 (age 48)
- Place of birth: Lund, Sweden
- Height: 5 ft 10 in (1.78 m)
- Position: Goalkeeper

Team information
- Current team: Umeå IK
- Number: 1

Youth career
- 1983–1992: Sövestads IF
- 1993–1995: Veberöds AIF

Senior career*
Years	Team	Apps	(Gls)
1996–2008	LdB FC Malmö	222	(0)
2009	Chicago Red Stars	20	(0)
2010–2013	Umeå IK	66	(0)

International career^{‡}
1999–2009	Sweden	80	(0)
- * Club domestic league appearances and goals as of 21:48, 21 May 2014 (UTC) ‡ National team caps and goals as of 21:48, 21 May 2014 (UTC)

Elin Hanna Caroline Jönsson (born 22 November 1977) is a Swedish former football goalkeeper who played for Malmö and Umeå IK of Damallsvenskan and Chicago Red Stars of Women's Professional Soccer (WPS). She played 80 times for the Sweden women's national football team between 1999 and 2009.

== Club career ==
=== Youth career ===
Jönsson, a farmer's daughter, grew up and began playing in her locality of Sövestad. She played for Sövestads IF, which was her first club, until she left to join Veberöds AIF before the 1993 season. Jönsson remained with Veberöds until signing for Malmö FF Dam prior to the 1996 season.

=== Malmö FF Dam and LdB FC Malmö ===
Jönsson began her Malmö FF Dam career in 1996. She continuously played there, even through the renaming of the squad to LdB FC Malmö in April 2007. She won an award for Sweden's Best Goalkeeper in 2003 and 2006 and was given the Football Figure award in 2003. Injuries slowed down Jönsson in 2007 and parts of 2008 when she tore her anterior cruciate ligament.

Jönsson left the team in 2008, when she seemingly announced her retirement from both club and international football.

=== Chicago Red Stars ===
Chicago Red Stars of Women's Professional Soccer in the United States selected Jönsson in the 4th round of the 2008 WPS International Draft on 24 September 2008, despite Jönsson's claims of retirement earlier upon her departure from LdB FC Malmö. It was announced on 3 February 2009 that she had signed with the American club, where she would be joined with fellow Sweden National Team member Frida Östberg from Umeå IK.

In the inaugural 2009 Women's Professional Soccer season, Jönsson played every minute of Chicago's campaign, allowing 25 goals in 20 games. Chicago failed to make the post-season tournament. On 28 September 2009, Chicago announced that they had exercised the team option for 2010 on Jönsson's contract. But in January 2010 she decided to join Umeå IK on a three-year contract, combining play with studies.

=== Umeå IK ===
Jönsson left Umeå and retired from football in June 2013, aged 35. She said her body was no longer able to withstand the rigours of top-level football.

== National team ==
Jönsson made her debut for the Sweden National Team on 16 March 1999 against Norway. She's represented Sweden at the 2001 and 2005 editions of the UEFA Women's Championships. She participated in the 2000, 2004, and 2008 versions of the Olympic Games. She also made one FIFA Women's World Cup tournament in 2003.

Due to her ligament tear in 2007, she missed the 2007 FIFA Women's World Cup. Jönsson returned to full fitness and was named to the Sweden team for the 2008 Summer Olympics.

She retired from international play in 2009, having made 80 senior team appearances.
