= Sövestad =

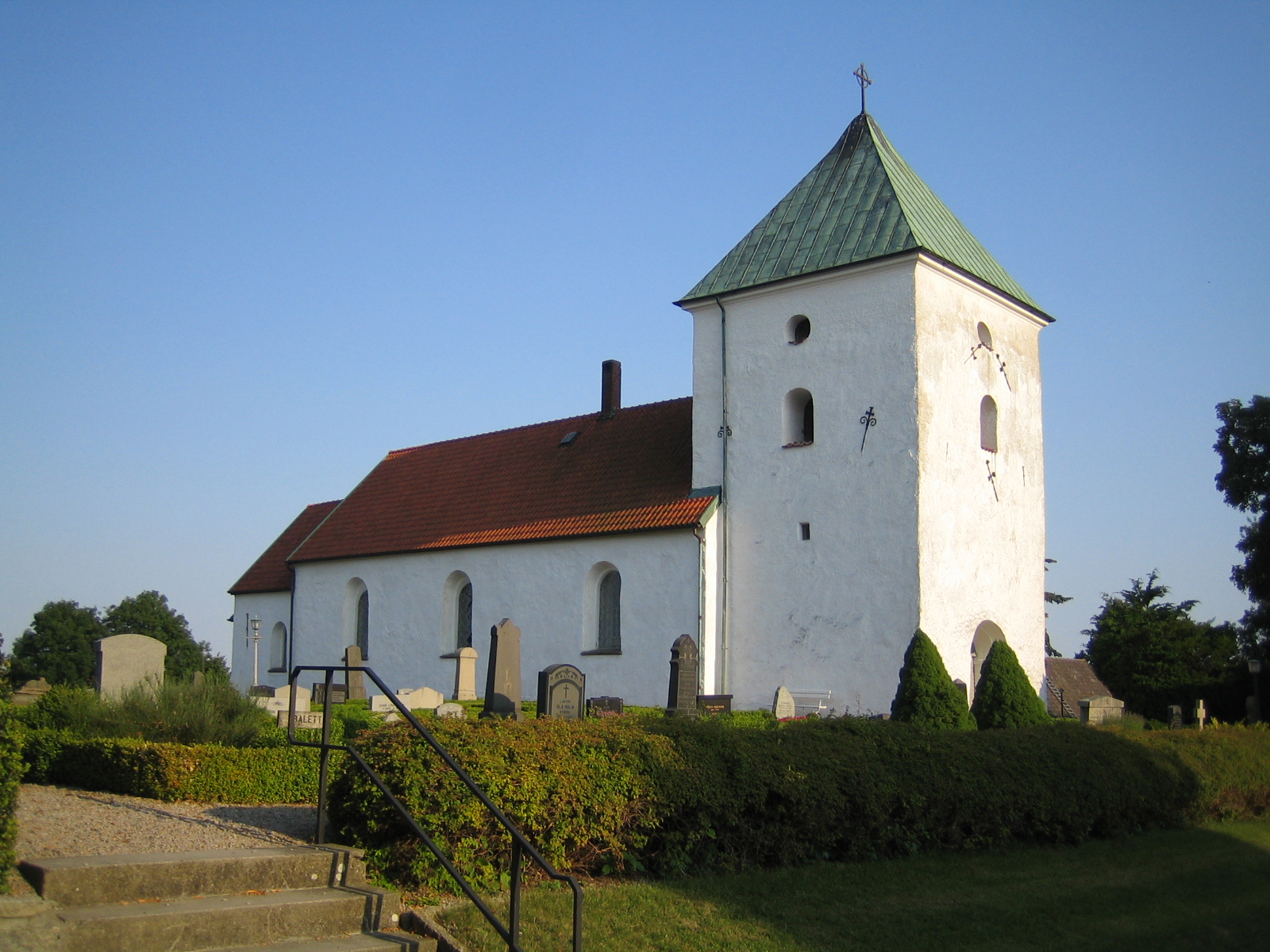
- Sövestad Church

- Location within Skåne Location within Sweden
- Coordinates: 55°30′N 13°47′E
- Country: Sweden
- Province: Skåne
- County: Skåne County
- Municipality: Ystad Municipality

Area
  - Total: 0.43 km^{2} (0.17 sq mi)

Population (31 December 2010)
  - Total: 386
  - Density: 894/km^{2} (2,320/sq mi)
- Time zone: UTC+1 (CET)
  - Summer (DST): UTC+2 (CEST)

Sövestad is a locality in Ystad Municipality, Skåne County, Sweden, with 386 inhabitants in 2010. The medieval Sövestad Church is the centre of the village.
