= Glemmingebro =

- Location within Skåne Location within Sweden
- Coordinates: 55°27′N 14°01′E
- Country: Sweden
- Province: Skåne
- County: Skåne County
- Municipality: Ystad Municipality

Area
  - Total: 0.48 km^{2} (0.19 sq mi)

Population (31 December 2010)
  - Total: 376
  - Density: 790/km^{2} (2,000/sq mi)
- Time zone: UTC+1 (CET)
  - Summer (DST): UTC+2 (CEST)

Glemmingebro is a locality situated in Ystad Municipality, Skåne County, Sweden, with 376 inhabitants in 2010.
