= Stora Herrestad =

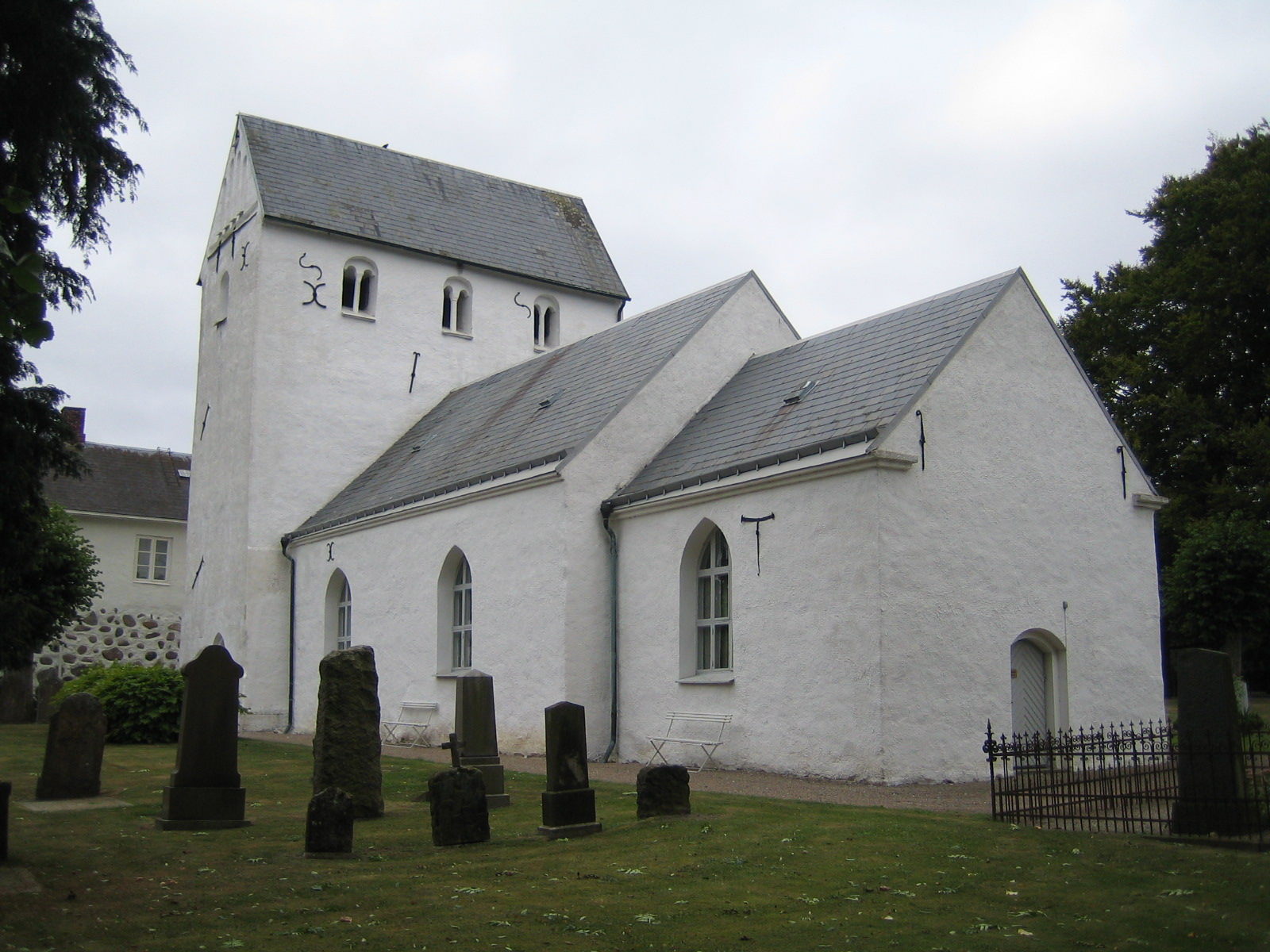
- Stora Herrestad Church

- Location within Skåne Location within Sweden
- Coordinates: 55°28′N 13°52′E
- Country: Sweden
- Province: Skåne
- County: Skåne County
- Municipality: Ystad Municipality

Area
  - Total: 0.47 km^{2} (0.18 sq mi)

Population (31 December 2010)
  - Total: 293
  - Density: 618/km^{2} (1,600/sq mi)
- Time zone: UTC+1 (CET)
  - Summer (DST): UTC+2 (CEST)

Stora Herrestad is a locality situated in Ystad Municipality, Skåne County, Sweden with 293 inhabitants in 2010.
