= Hedeskoga =

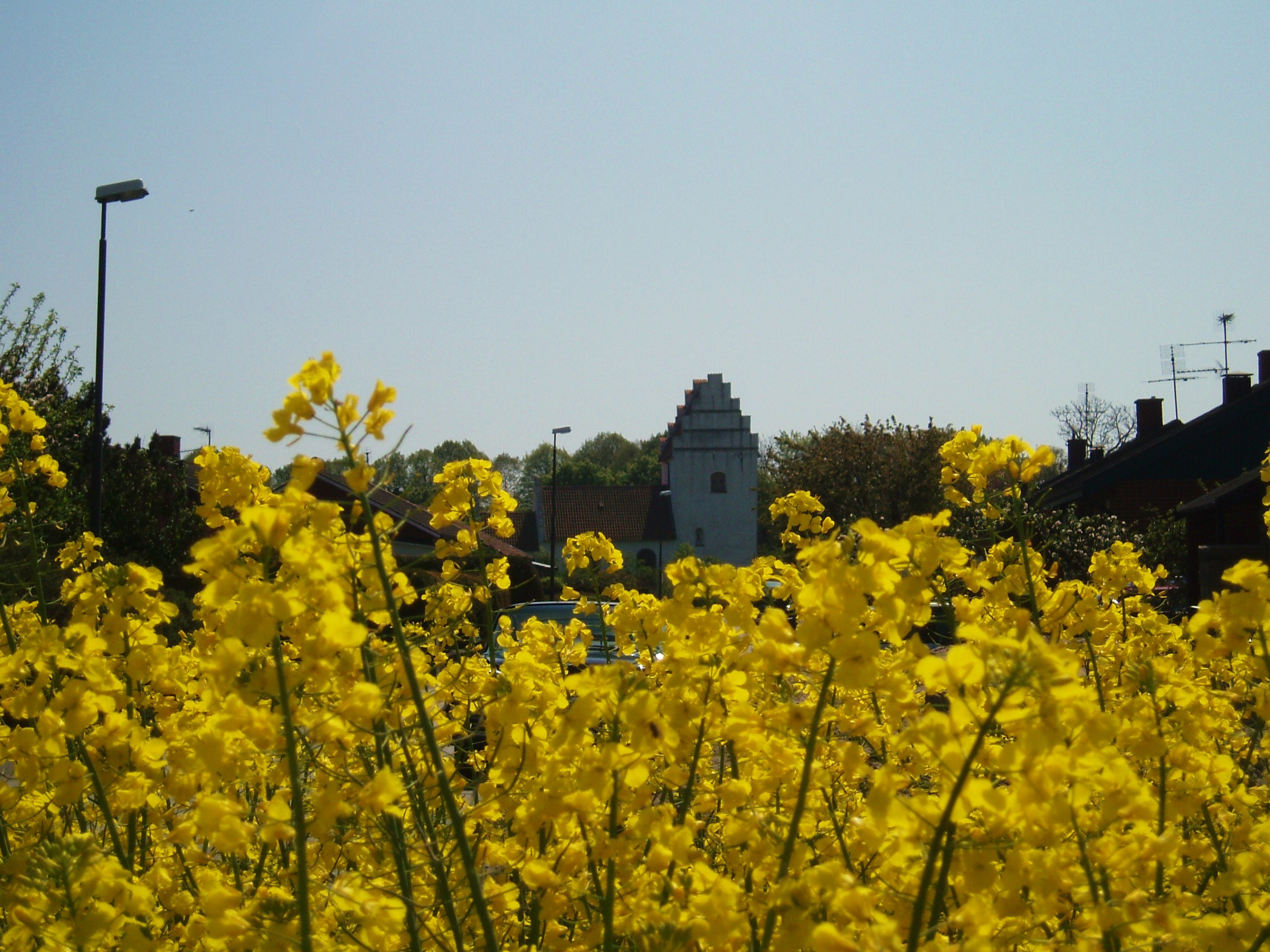
- Hedeskoga church behind a field of rapeseed.

- Location within Skåne Location within Sweden
- Coordinates: 55°27′N 13°48′E
- Country: Sweden
- Province: Skåne
- County: Skåne County
- Municipality: Ystad Municipality

Area
  - Total: 0.18 km^{2} (0.069 sq mi)

Population (31 December 2010)
  - Total: 282
  - Density: 1,574/km^{2} (4,080/sq mi)
- Time zone: UTC+1 (CET)
  - Summer (DST): UTC+2 (CEST)

Hedeskoga is a locality situated in Ystad Municipality, Skåne County, Sweden with 282 inhabitants in 2010.
