= Sövestad Church =

Coordinates: 55°30′03″N 13°47′50″E

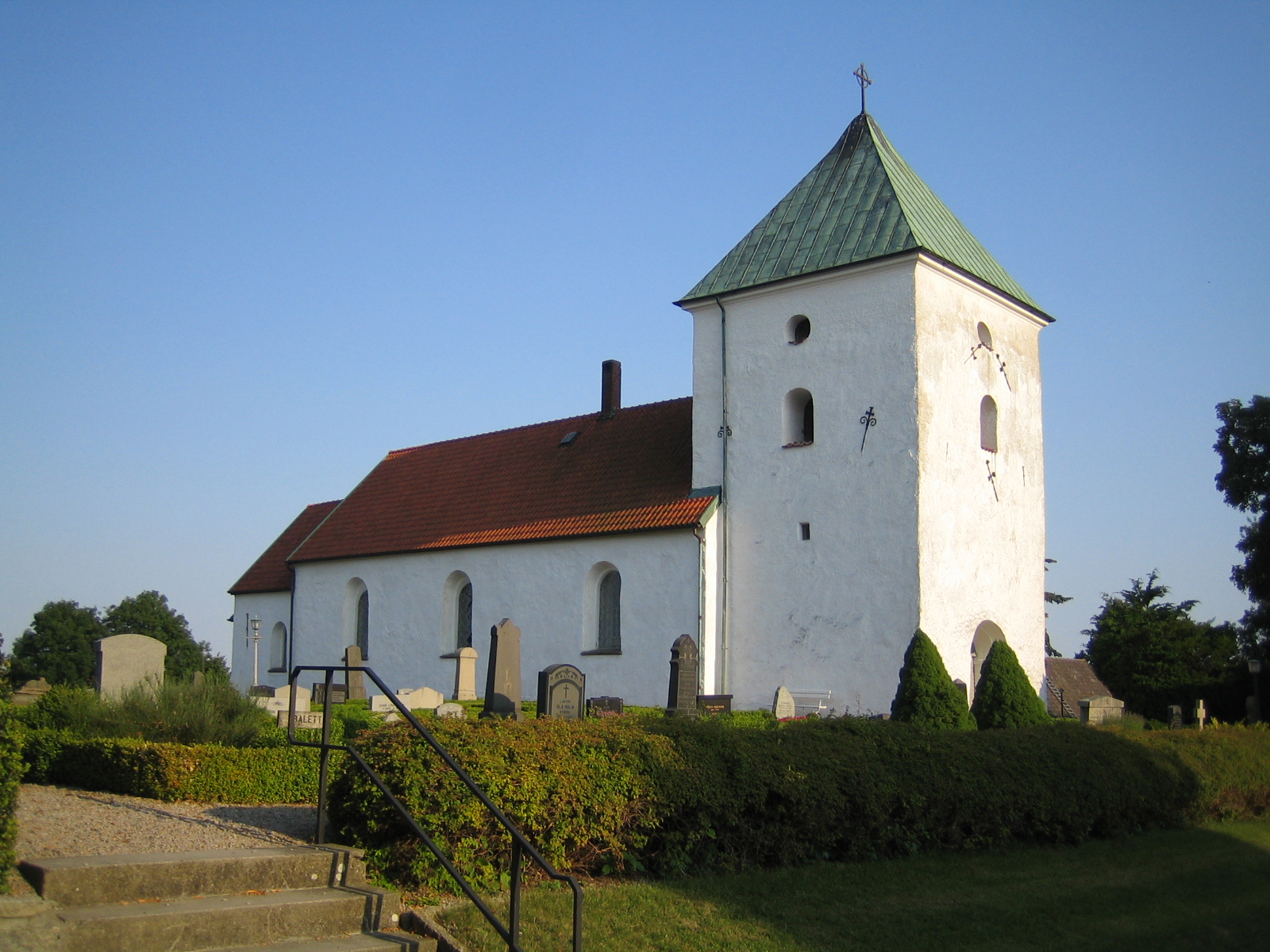
Sövestad Church, external view

Sövestad Church (Swedish: Sövestads kyrka) is a medieval Lutheran church in Ystad Municipality, Skåne County, Sweden. It belongs to the Diocese of Lund.

== History and architecture ==
The oldest parts of Sövestad Church was probably built by a workshop led by a master stonemason sometimes referred to as Carl Stenmästare, who was active in Scania during the middle of the 12th century. This first church was considerably smaller and lacked a tower. It was enlarged during the Middle Ages, with in total around 7 metres (23 ft) between the 14th and 16th centuries. An original wooden ceiling was during this process also replaced with a vaulted ceiling, the tower and a church porch added and the gables adorned with crow-stepped gables. The church porch has since been converted into a side chapel, and the crow-stepped gables have disappeared. Gone are also a set of murals which adorned the vaults. The church was renovated at the end of the 19th century and again in 1916 by Swedish architect Theodor Wåhlin (1864-1948).

Between 1649—1930 the church was subjected to the overlord-ship of the Piper family (members of the Swedish nobility) of Krageholm Castle, which meant that the family received some of its income from the church and was responsible for maintaining and decorating it. Among the fittings of the church, the baptismal font is the oldest, dating from the Middle Ages; it is not however the original one. The altarpiece dates from 1627 and was donated by the owners of Krageholm Castle. The pulpit and the triumphal cross both date from the 1720s.
