= Köpingebro =

- Location within Skåne Location within Sweden
- Coordinates: 55°28′N 13°56′E
- Country: Sweden
- Province: Skåne
- County: Skåne County
- Municipality: Ystad Municipality

Area
  - Total: 0.98 km^{2} (0.38 sq mi)

Population (31 December 2010)
  - Total: 1,134
  - Density: 1,155/km^{2} (2,990/sq mi)
- Time zone: UTC+1 (CET)
  - Summer (DST): UTC+2 (CEST)

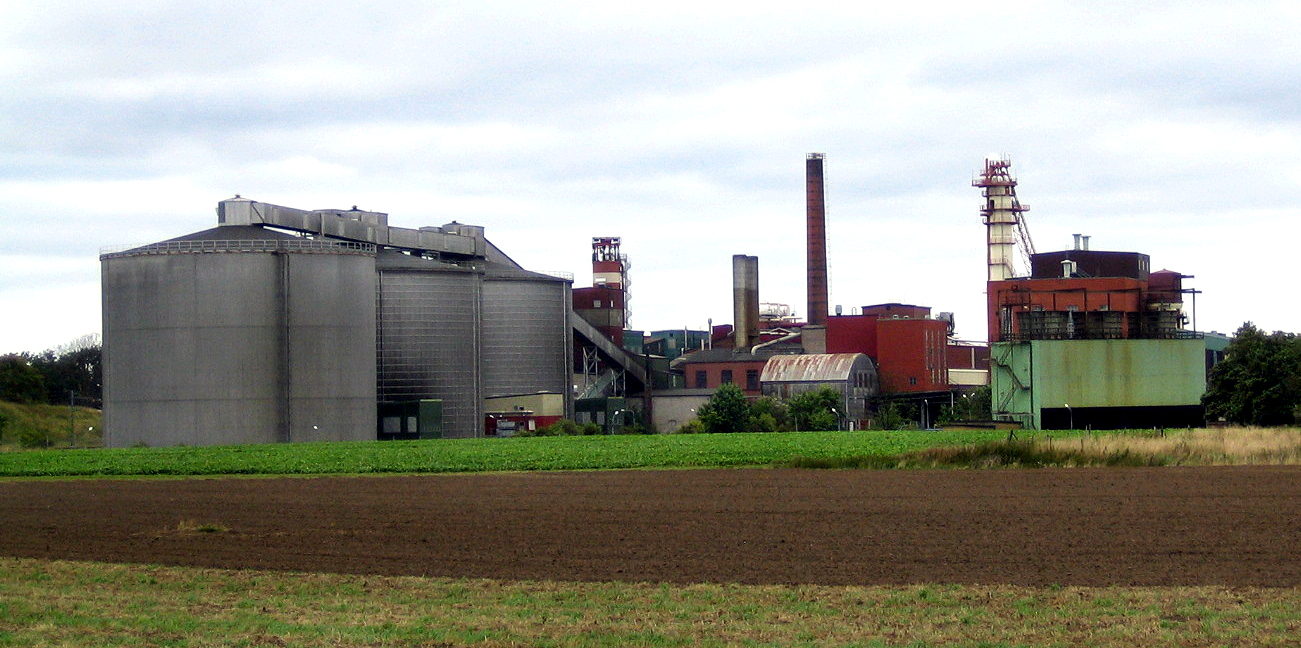
The closed-down sugarmill in Köpingebro

Köpingebro is a locality situated in Ystad Municipality, Skåne County, Sweden with 1,134 inhabitants in 2010.
