= Löderup =

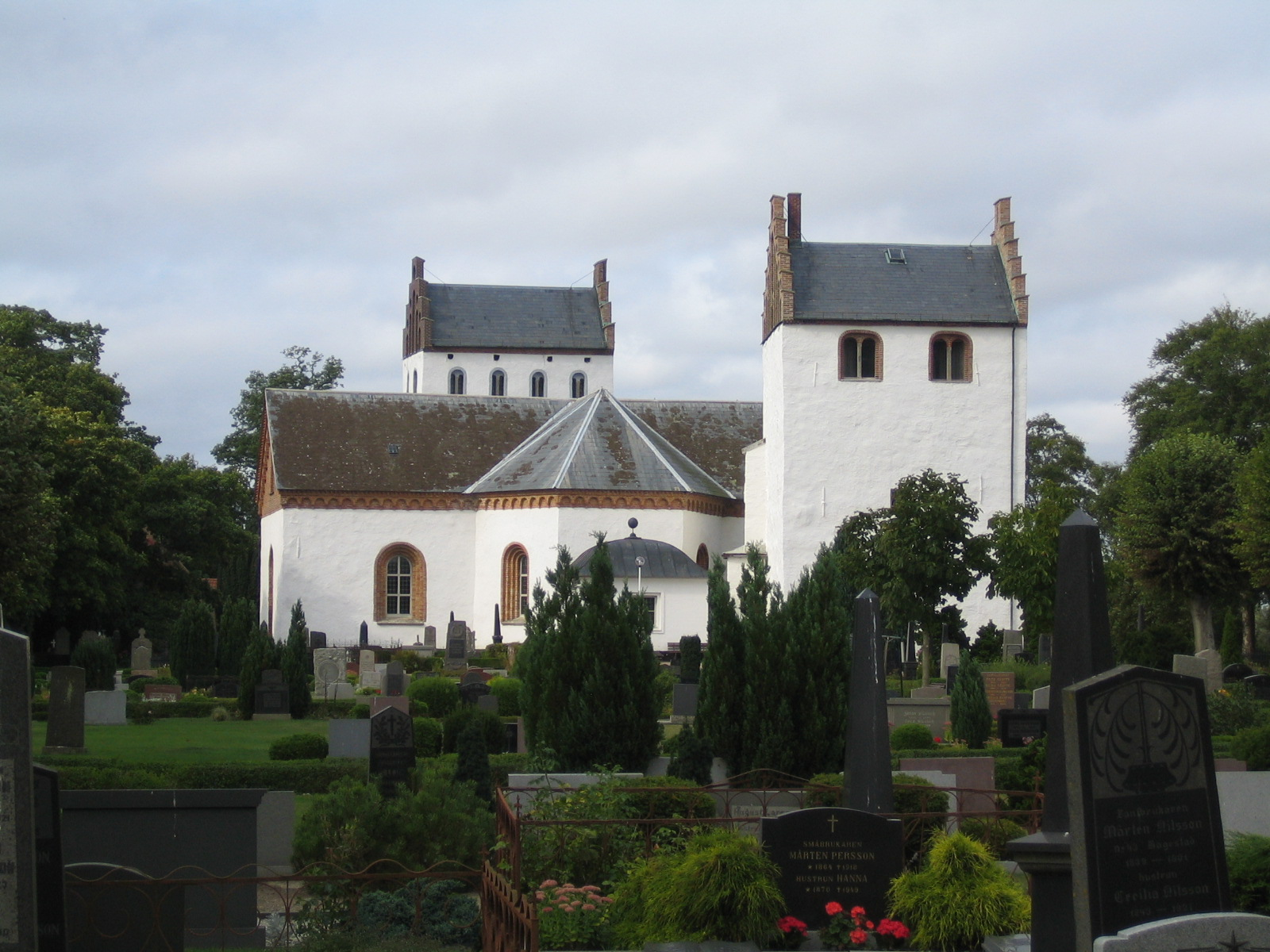
- Löderup Church

- Location within Skåne Location within Sweden
- Coordinates: 55°26′N 14°07′E
- Country: Sweden
- Province: Skåne
- County: Skåne County
- Municipality: Ystad Municipality

Area
  - Total: 0.63 km^{2} (0.24 sq mi)

Population (31 December 2010)
  - Total: 550
  - Density: 876/km^{2} (2,270/sq mi)
- Time zone: UTC+1 (CET)
  - Summer (DST): UTC+2 (CEST)

Löderup is a locality situated in Ystad Municipality, Skåne County, Sweden with 550 inhabitants in 2010.

Medieval Löderup Church lies in Löderup.
