= Lundagård (castle) =

Castle in Sweden

Coordinates: 55.7047°N 13.1939°E

Lundagård, located in present-day Sweden, was in the Middle Ages a castle for the Danish archbishop of Lund, whose archbishopric between 1103 and 1160 stretched from the North German coast all the way up to the Arctic.

Lundagård was built around the year 1000 and was surrounded by a defensive wall with towers and inside, on the courtyard, there were stables, barns, sheds and two large stone houses. One was the residence, the other a "knight's hall" used for representation. Within the wall were also gardens, the royal mint and the bishop's church, which in the early 12th century was rebuilt into Lund cathedral.

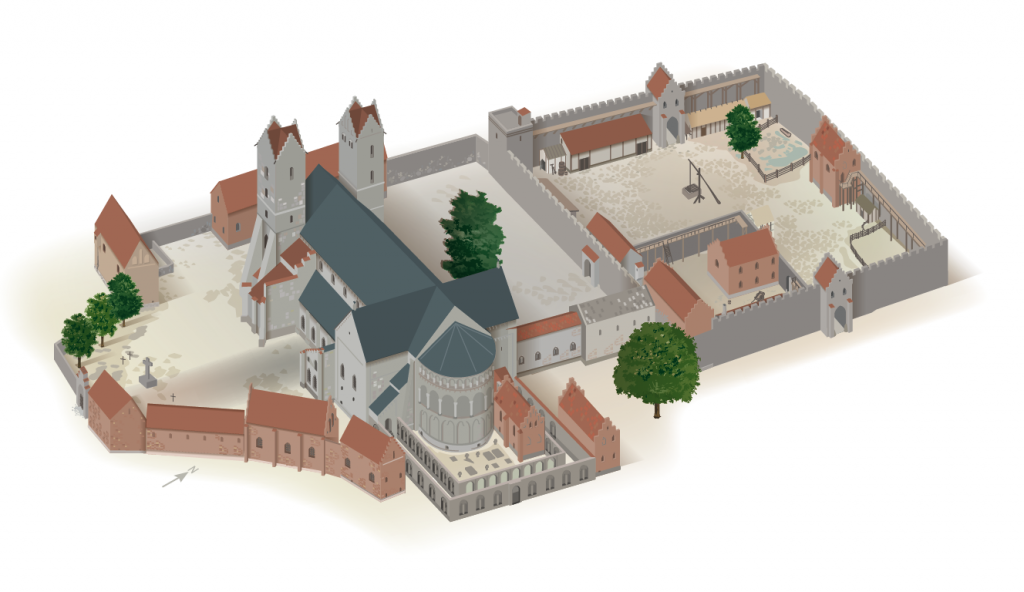
The fortified Lundagård castle had Lund cathedral within its walls. Reconstruction by the Department of Archaeology, Lund University.

Lundagård lost its importance during the Danish Reformation and was replaced by a royal residence, later called Kungshuset in Swedish.
