= Ystad Municipality =

Ystad Municipality Ystads kommun
- Municipality
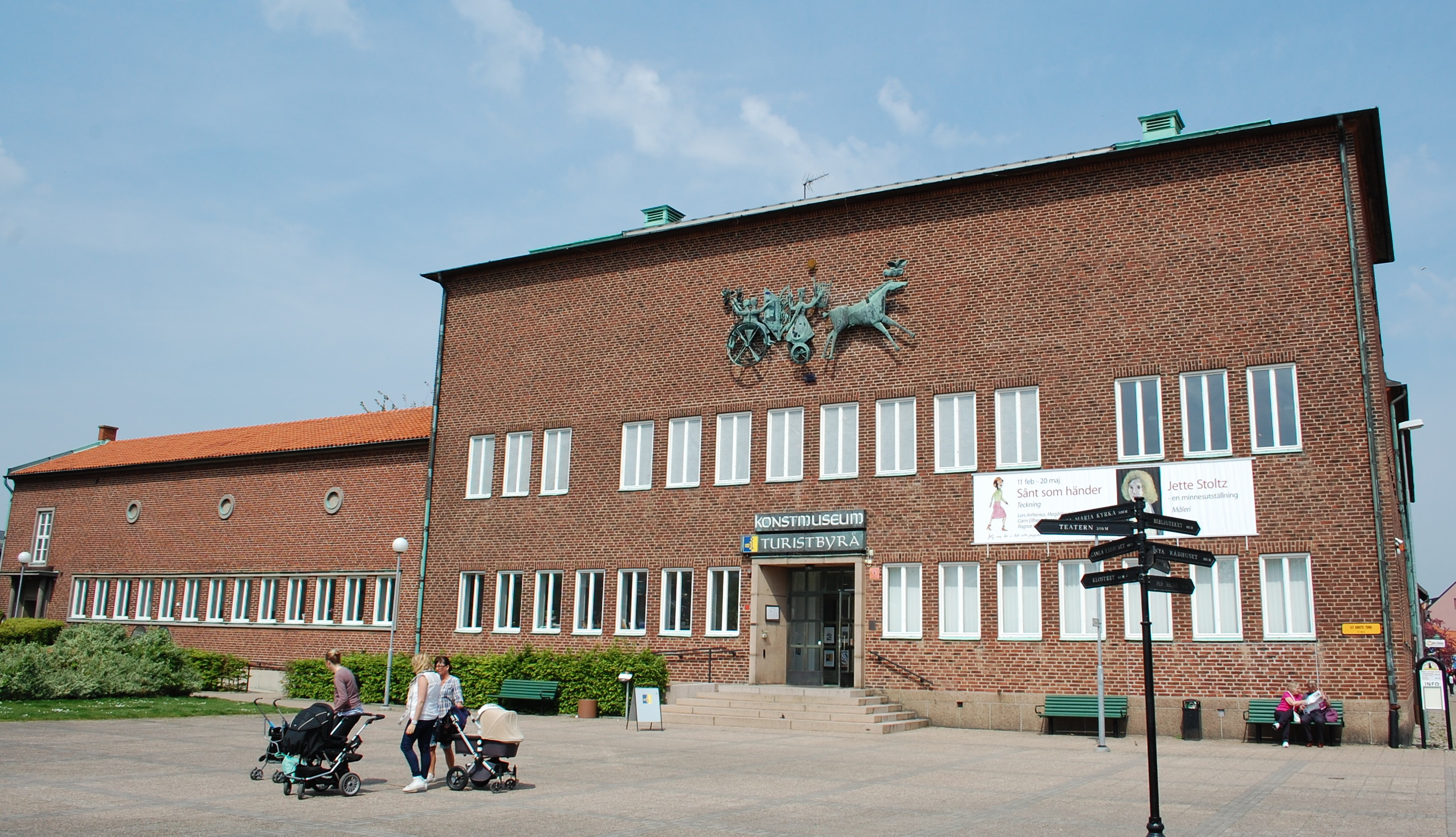
- Ystad Art Museum

- Coat of arms

- Coordinates: 55°25′N 13°50′E
- Country: Sweden
- County: Scania County
- Seat: Ystad

Area
  - Total: 1,189.32 km^{2} (459.20 sq mi)
  - Land: 350.08 km^{2} (135.17 sq mi)
  - Water: 839.24 km^{2} (324.03 sq mi)
- Area as of 1 January 2014.

Population (30 June 2025)
  - Total: 32,193
  - Density: 91.959/km^{2} (238.17/sq mi)
- Time zone: UTC+1 (CET)
  - Summer (DST): UTC+2 (CEST)
- ISO 3166 code: SE
- Province: Scania
- Municipal code: 1286
- Website: www.ystad.se

Ystad Municipality (Swedish: Ystads kommun) is a municipality in Scania County in southern Sweden. Its seat is the town of Ystad. The present municipality was created in 1971 by the amalgamation of the former City of Ystad with four surrounding municipalities.

== Localities ==
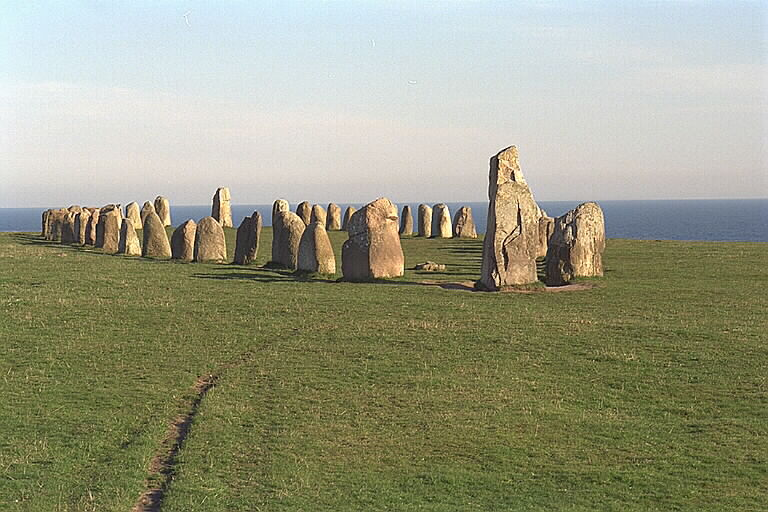
Ales stone

There were ten localities in the municipality as of 2018.

Locality	Population
Ystad	19,498
Köpingebro	1,252
Nybrostrand	1,119
Svarte	920
Löderup	642
Glemmingebro	425
Sövestad	367
Stora Herrestad	331
Hedeskoga	262
Rynge och Vallösa	217

== Demographics ==
This is a demographic table based on Ystad Municipality's electoral districts in the 2022 Swedish general election sourced from SVT's election platform, in turn taken from SCB official statistics.

In total there were 31,531 residents, including 25,215 Swedish citizens of voting age. 39.4% voted for the left coalition and 59.5% for the right coalition. Indicators are in percentage points except population totals and income.

Location	Residents	Citizen adults	Left vote	Right vote	Employed	Swedish parents	Foreign heritage	Income SEK	Degree
Location	Residents	Citizen adults	%	%	Employed	Swedish parents	Foreign heritage	Income SEK	Degree
Bellevue N	2,075	1,718	39.2	59.5	84	88	12	26,874	42
Bellevue S	1,315	1,088	46.0	53.1	82	87	13	25,074	43
Edvinshem N	1,453	1,229	45.1	54.5	87	91	9	25,068	39
Edvinshem SÖ-Gjuteriet	1,629	1,389	44.6	54.2	80	83	17	22,409	41
Egna hem-Solbacken SÖ	1,245	972	44.7	54.1	88	89	11	28,768	52
Gamla staden V	1,801	1,532	47.7	51.0	75	83	17	21,679	40
Gamla staden Ö	1,861	1,568	42.7	55.9	78	83	17	22,554	39
Glemmingebro-Ingelstorp	1,329	1,030	39.6	59.2	78	84	16	22,646	42
Hälsobacken	1,310	1,052	42.9	56.3	88	87	13	25,887	43
Köpingebro	1,323	940	33.4	65.1	87	88	12	27,175	37
Löderup	1,171	994	39.3	60.2	77	86	14	22,864	39
Nybrostrand-St Köpinge	2,000	1,570	30.0	69.3	84	92	8	28,089	45
Solbacken N	1,589	1,242	40.9	57.1	83	85	15	26,648	42
St Herrestad-Hedskoga	2,221	1,588	33.8	65.2	89	91	9	29,677	43
Surbrunnen-Ö förstaden N	2,159	1,869	41.1	58.2	81	87	13	22,465	37
Svarte-Snårestad	2,193	1,631	37.3	61.9	83	89	11	29,810	50
Sövestad-Baldringe	1,401	1,094	32.7	65.9	87	91	9	27,432	39
V Sjöstaden-Åkerholm	1,804	1,365	33.9	64.8	85	84	16	27,430	44
Ö Förstaden S-Regementet	1,652	1,344	39.4	60.0	71	75	25	22,285	36
Source: SVT

== International relations ==
=== Twin towns — sister cities ===
Ystad is twinned with:

- (Lithuania) Druskininkai
- (Poland) Świnoujście
- (Norway) Haugesund
- (Denmark) Ballerup
