= Carl Georg Brunius =

Swedish classical scholar, architect and art historian

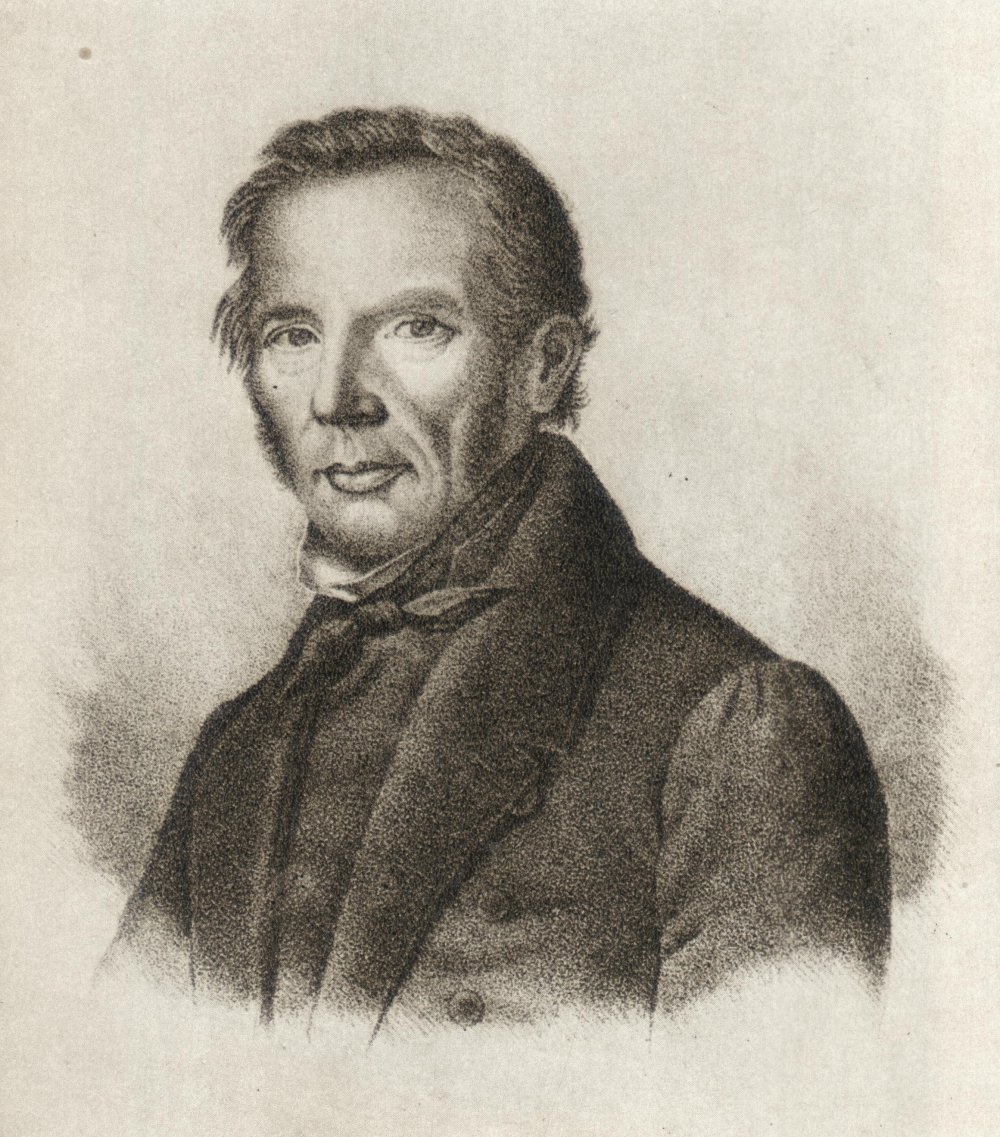
Carl Georg Brunius

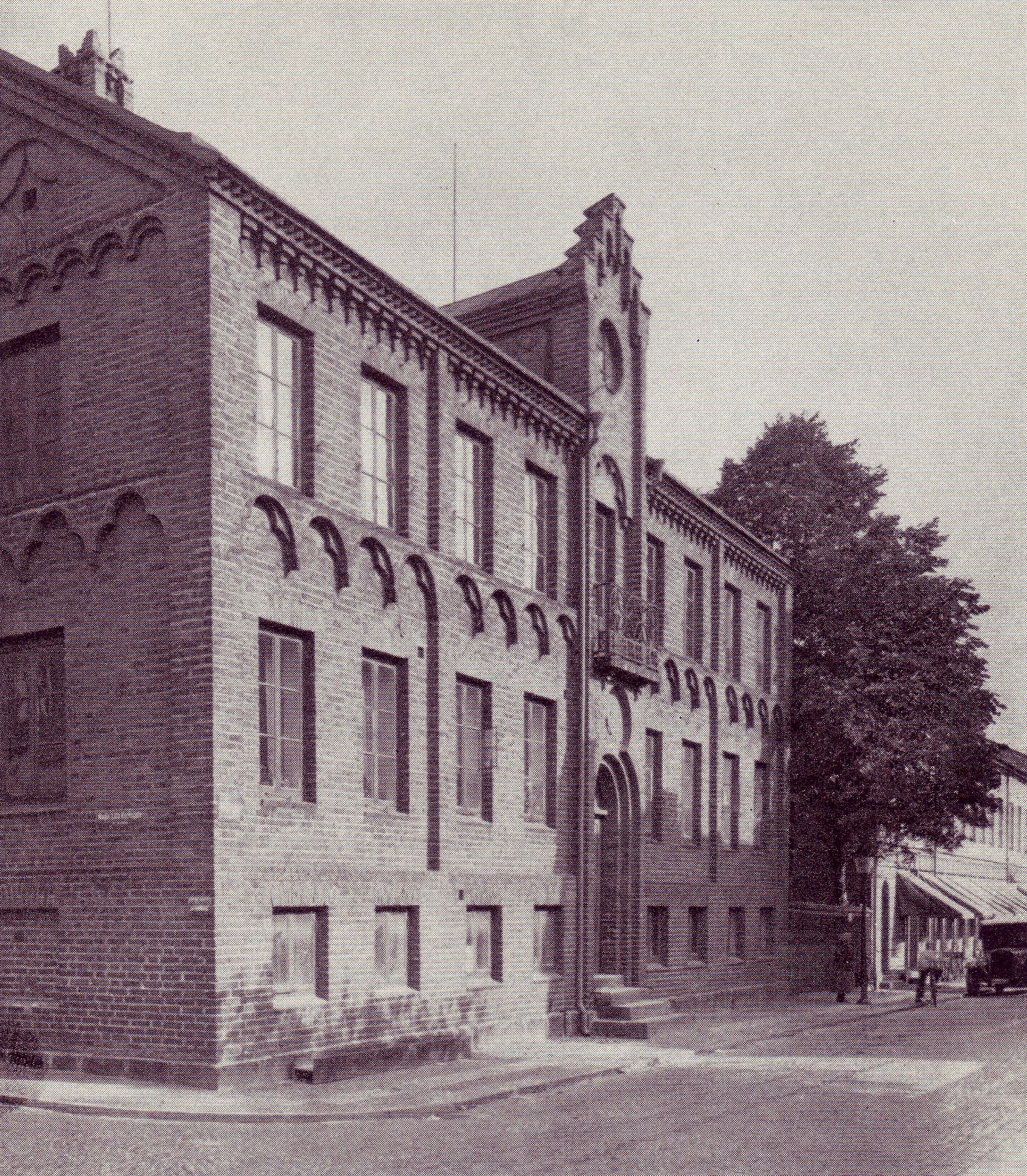
Brunius's self-designed home at Kiliansgatan in Lund

Carl Georg Brunius (23 March 1793 – 12 November 1869) was a classical scholar, art historian, archaeologist and architect. He served as a professor and rector at Lund University. During 1833–1859, he led the restoration work of Lund Cathedral.

== Biography ==
Brunius was born at Tanum parish in Tanum Municipality in Västra Götaland County, Sweden. He was the son of the vicar Gomer Brunius and his wife Mariana Rodhe. He studied at Lund University, where he became a candidate in philology in 1813, a candidate in philosophy in 1814, a master of philosophy in 1814. He became an associate professor of Greek language at Lund University in 1815 and extra regular assistant professor in 1816, assistant professor in 1820. He became professor of Greek in 1824 filling the vacancy created when Esaias Tegnér (1782–1846) became Bishop of the Diocese of Växjö. Brunius also served as rector in 1831 and 1841 and retired as professor emeritus in 1858.

Brunius spent most of his career in the study of art, architecture and antiquities and as a working architect. The focus in classical scholarship in the age in which Brunius worked was on the practical mastering of the languages. However beyond a few Latin poems, his contributions within his academic discipline were insignificant and had mostly ceased by the time he received his professorial chair.

Together with professor Johan Gustaf Liljegren (1791–1837), Brunius co-authored the first part of Nordiska fornlemningar, published in 1819 as well as a work on petroglyphs. Brunius later produced the first systematic investigation of mediaeval art and architecture in current Sweden, writing substantial works on the history of art in Scania and on the island of Gotland.

In his architectural work, Brunius wanted to revive the mediaeval styles; Romanesque as well as the more fashionable Gothic, which he preferred over the more recent Baroque and Rococo styles. His career as an architect began with his work on Lund Cathedral in collaboration with Stockholm-based architect Axel Nyström (1793–1868). The cathedral had for some time been in severe need of restoration and Nyström was given the job in 1832.

Brunius had a keen interest in draughtsmanship dating from childhood. He had been elected a member of the Lund Cathedral assembly (domkyrkoråd) in 1831 and was later elected chairman. He was entrusted with the task of supervising the work on the cathedral, which took more than 25 years to complete. Brunius designed or restored a number of other buildings in Lund, including the Bishop's House and a house for himself, as well as a large number of parish churches and other buildings in the surrounding province of Scania.

== Personal life ==
In 1829, he was married with Maria Charlotta Tillander (1804–1883). Brunius died in Lund and was buried at Östra kyrkogården, Lund.

== Selected works ==
- Nordens äldsta metropolitankyrka; eller, Historisk och arkitektonisk beskrifning öfver Lunds domkyrka (1836)

== Other sources ==
- Rydbeck, Otto (1926) "Brunius, Carl Georg" (Svenskt biografiskt lexikon)
- Rydbeck, Otto (1915) Bidrag till Lunds domkyrkas byggnadshistoria (Lund: C. W. K. Gleerup)
- Grandien, Bo (1971) Från latinskald till byggmästare: biografisk inledning till ett studium av Carl Georg Brunius som arkitekt, restaurator och konstvetenskaplig författare (Uppsala University)
- Green, Allan (1992) Carl Georg Brunius: en bohuslänning i Lund : till 200-årsminnet av hans födelse (Uddevalla : Bohusläns museum)
