= Hedvig Charlotta Nordenflycht =

Swedish poet, feminist and salon hostess (1718–1763)

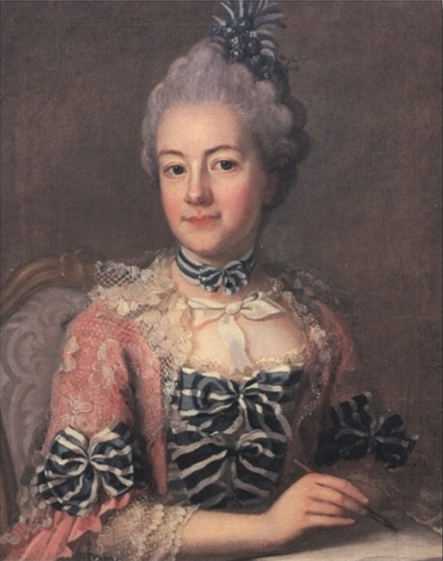
- Portrait by Ulrika Pasch
- Born: 28 November 1718; Stockholm, Sweden
- Died: 29 June 1763 (aged 44); Stockholm, Sweden
- Occupations: Writer; poet
- Spouse: Jacob Fabricius

Hedvig Charlotta Nordenflycht (28 November 1718 – 29 June 1763) was a Swedish poet, feminist and salon hostess.

== Biography ==
She was the youngest of five children of the wealthy official Anders Andersson Nordbohm (1675–1734) and Christina Rosin. Her father was ennobled as Nordenflycht in 1727. After the retirement of her father in 1730, the family settled on the estate Viby. She was sporadically tutored by Henning Tideman, the teacher of her brother Anders Nordenflycht (1710–1740), in Latin and German, and studied philosophy and theology as an autodidact, being otherwise only educated in domestics and accomplishments. In 1734, she was engaged against her will to Johan Tideman (1710–1737), a pupil of Christopher Polhem and supporter of the Wolffian philosophy. Johan Tideman and his naturalism and philosophy made a great impact upon her development and satisfied her intellectually, but she opposed their engagement because she did not find him physically attractive. The engagement was, however, broken by the early death of Tideman.

On 23 April 1741 she married Jacob Fabricius (1704–1741), who had been her French language teacher, and was appointed chaplain of the admiralty at Karlskrona prior to their marriage. This marriage was not arranged and is described as a mutually happy love match: it was in fact opposed by her brother, who wished for a more socially and economically advantageous marriage which could benefit his own career, but she was supported by her mother. She had no children during her marriage. Before her departure to Karlskrona, she wrote the poetic collection Cronstedtska poemboken, which was a gift to her friend countess Margaretha Beata Cronstedt.

The death of her spouse in December 1741, only a couple of months after their wedding, caused a severe depressive shock. She retired to a rented cottage at Lidingö outside Stockholm to mourn, during which she wrote the Den sörgande turtur-dufvan, poems describing her longing for her lost love and the nature of sadness and loss.

Nordenflycht returned to Stockholm after her mourning period, where she settled. Her economic situation had at that point deteriorated: her late spouse had no fortune and the inheritance after her father had been wasted by her brother. She was forced to support herself and decided to do so through her literary talent.

In 1742, she debuted as a published author with Svenska fruntimrets klagan (The Lament of the Swedish Woman), a poem over queen Ulrika Eleonora. The same year she applied for a pension from the admiralty after her late spouse. Her application was granted the following year by an intervention from the king, who referred to the talent of her literary production. She wrote poems for the royal house at several occasions, and was in 1747 granted a small allowance from crown princess Louisa Ulrika. Aside from the allowance from the crown princess and the small pension from the admiralty, she supported herself by writing poems on commission, and established herself as a successful writer. She courted Polhem, Linné and Abraham Bäck with poems, and lived for long periods in the home of her personal friends, count and countess Cronstedt, in whose household she functioned as somewhat as a court poet. After the Great Stockholm Fire of 1759 she and her mother lost their home, after which she successfully appealed to the Riksdag of the Estates for help, making a spectacular appeal in person to the clergy estate. She was granted an annual allowance for life in 1752, after which her economy was settled and she could concentrate on her writing without having to concern herself with monetary problems.

On 14 April 1753, Nordenflycht was inducted in Tankebyggarorden, a literary academy in Stockholm under the leadership of Carl Fredrik Eckleff, founded shortly before based on French role models, which had the purpose to reform the contemporary Swedish literature. Nordenflycht's name as a member of the academy was "Uranie", and she made it a center of a literary salon. In the academy, she became closely affiliated with Gustaf Philip Creutz and Gustaf Fredrik Gyllenborg, but her conflicts with Olof von Dahlin is well known.

Nordenflycht has been described as hostile to other women writers. This description originates from an allegation of Olof von Dahlin, who describes an incident where he claims that she became enraged when she was at one point asked why she was the only female member of the Tankebyggarorden, because she considered herself the only female worthy of such an honor. These ideas are also upheld by the fact that she failed to promote several other female writers during her time in the Order It must be pointed out, however, that von Dahlin and Nordenflycht were known antagonists who made several negative accusations toward and about each other during their lifetime. This is also contradicted by the behavior of Nordenflycht during her lifetime: she was a friend and correspondent of fellow feminist writer Catharina Ahlgren, and enthusiastic in her support of other female writers, such as the group of female writers in Norrköping, Charlotta Löfgren, Hedvig Löfwenskiöld, Hedwig Walldorff and Margareta Gryzell, the first of whom she addressed in her original sketch of Fruentimrets försvar .

In 1762, Nordenflycht settled in a small villa she had built in the country side near Skokloster, which she called Lugnet (Calmness). At this point, she was in love with Johan Fischerström, seventeen years her junior. Johan Fischerström, born in 1735, was a student from Lund University with radical ideas and literary interests, who had made her acquaintance in the circles of the Tankebyggarorden. When Nordenflycht moved to Lugnet, she arranged for Fischerström to be given a position at the Sjöö Castle, the home of her personal friend Cathérine Charlotte De la Gardie. Her last poems took place during which was evidently a love triangle between Nordenflycht, Fischerström and De la Gardie during the winter of 1762–63. Johan Fischerström became the inspector of the estate and courted De la Gardie, which made the situation unbearable for Nordenflycht. The prose Fröjas räfst portray pastoral love, while her famous poem Öfver en hyacint describes clear sighted resignation in the midst of the disappointment of love.

Her death gave rise to rumors that she had died by suicide. According to contemporary legend, she attempted to swim over the water separating her from her beloved, which failed but resulted in a cold which took her life. Whether she did die by suicide is unknown, but whatever the case, she suffered from an illness by the time of her death, the symptoms which are described and are similar to the symptoms of cancer.

== Literary career ==
She published the Den sörgande turtur-dufvan in 1743, and the works of her late spouse, Amaranter, the following year. In 1746, she courted the Riksdag of the Estates with the patriotic poem Den frälsta Swea. With her poem Vigtiga frågor til en lärd, in which she asked Ludvig Holberg to bring order in the confusion between religion and science, she became known outside of Sweden.

Nordenflycht had a feminist approach early in her production. In her first published poem, the funeral poem over the late queen, she made herself the spokesperson of her own sex. She named her collected works of four volumes Qvinligit tankespel (Female Reflections). Initially using the pseudonym En Herdinna i Norden (Shepherdess of the North), she continued by publishing under her own name, which was at the time not common. Her willingness to play a public role as a literary woman could be regarded as a step in her defense of women's right to be intellectually active, and disprove the traditional disbelief in women's intellectual capacity by making herself an example.

Already in her non published Cronstedtska poemboken, she included the poem Fruentimbers plikt at upöfva deras vett (The Duty of Women to use their wit), and her defense of women's intelligence are often displayed in her work, most notably in her famous Fruentimrets försvar (Defense of Women) from 1761, written in opposition to the misogyny of Rousseau. In Friarekonsten (Art of proposing), she warns women, that men's assurances of friendship often turned to a demand of obedience after marriage.

In parallel to being a supporter of the scientific Age of Enlightenment, however, she was somewhat skeptic to the idea that the knowledge of science (in opposition to the emotional mysticism of religion) in itself could give happiness, a doubt she expressed in Till Criton (1754), written to Carl Klingenberg. Her cousin Carl Klingenberg (d. 1757) was until his death important as a representative of rational science, and his death caused her a severe depression.

In close cooperation with the other academy members of Tankebyggarorden, Gustaf Philip Creutz and Gustaf Fredric Gylleborg, she published two volumes of Witterhets arbeten (1759–62), which has been referred to as the breakthrough of the literary classicism in Sweden. During the 1750s, her style became more in the line of classicism, during which she became known and appreciated in Germany, and was awarded by Empress Elizabeth of Russia for her poem to the Russian heir to the throne.

As a poet, Nordenflycht is known for describing the existential conflict between religion and science during the age of enlightenment, and for her depictions of the emotional symptoms of human love and sorrow. Known as a sensitive and emotional person, she was also practical, logical and strong willed when it came to her defense of her own literary position, and her ideological defense of women's intellectual capacity.

== Legacy ==
In the national National Portrait Gallery (Sweden) of Gripsholm, which was opened in the 1822, she was one of the first six women of the Swedish history who was given a portrait in the collection, along with Bridget of Sweden, Vendela Skytte, Barbro Stigsdotter (Svinhufvud), Sophia Rosenhane and Sophia Elisabet Brenner.

== Selection of work ==
- 1743 : "Den sörjande Turturduvan" (The Sorrowing Turtledove)
- 1744 : Qwinligit Tankespel, av en herdinna i Norden (A Woman's Play of Thoughts, by a Shepherdess in the North), in four volumes between 1744 and 1750
- 1744 : Fruentimbers Plikt att upöfwa deras Wett (Women's duty to train their sense)
- 1752 : Våra Försök (Our Efforts), together with the other academy members
- 1761 : Fruntimrens försvar (To the Defense of Women)
- 1762 : Öfwer en hyacinth (Over a hyacinth)

== See also ==
- Anna Maria Lenngren
- Sophia Elisabet Brenner
