= Sweden–United States relations =

- Sweden: United States

Diplomatic mission
- Embassy of Sweden, Washington, D.C.: Embassy of the United States, Stockholm

Envoy
- Ambassador Urban Ahlin: Ambassador Christine Toretti

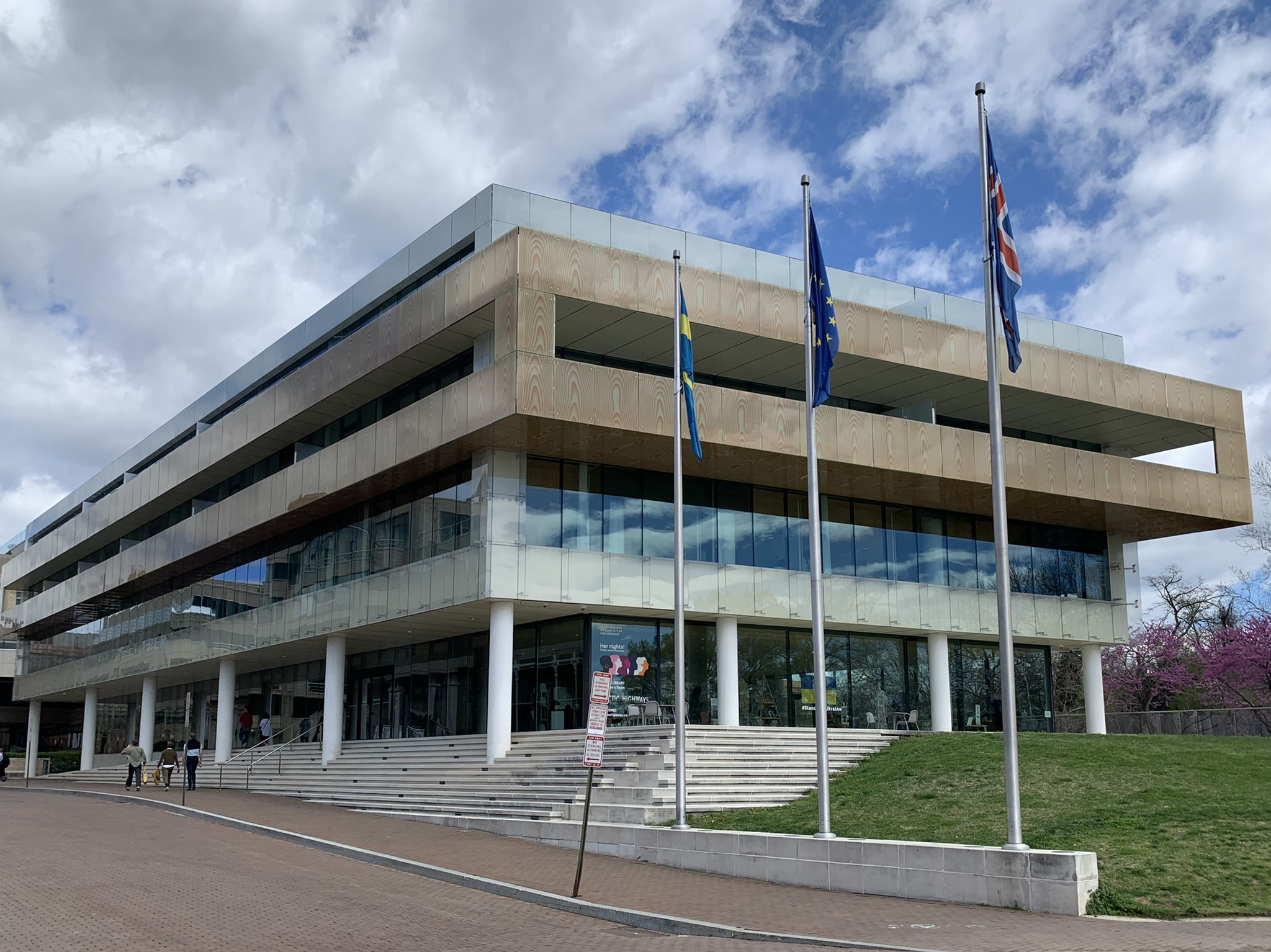
Embassy of Sweden, Washington, D.C.

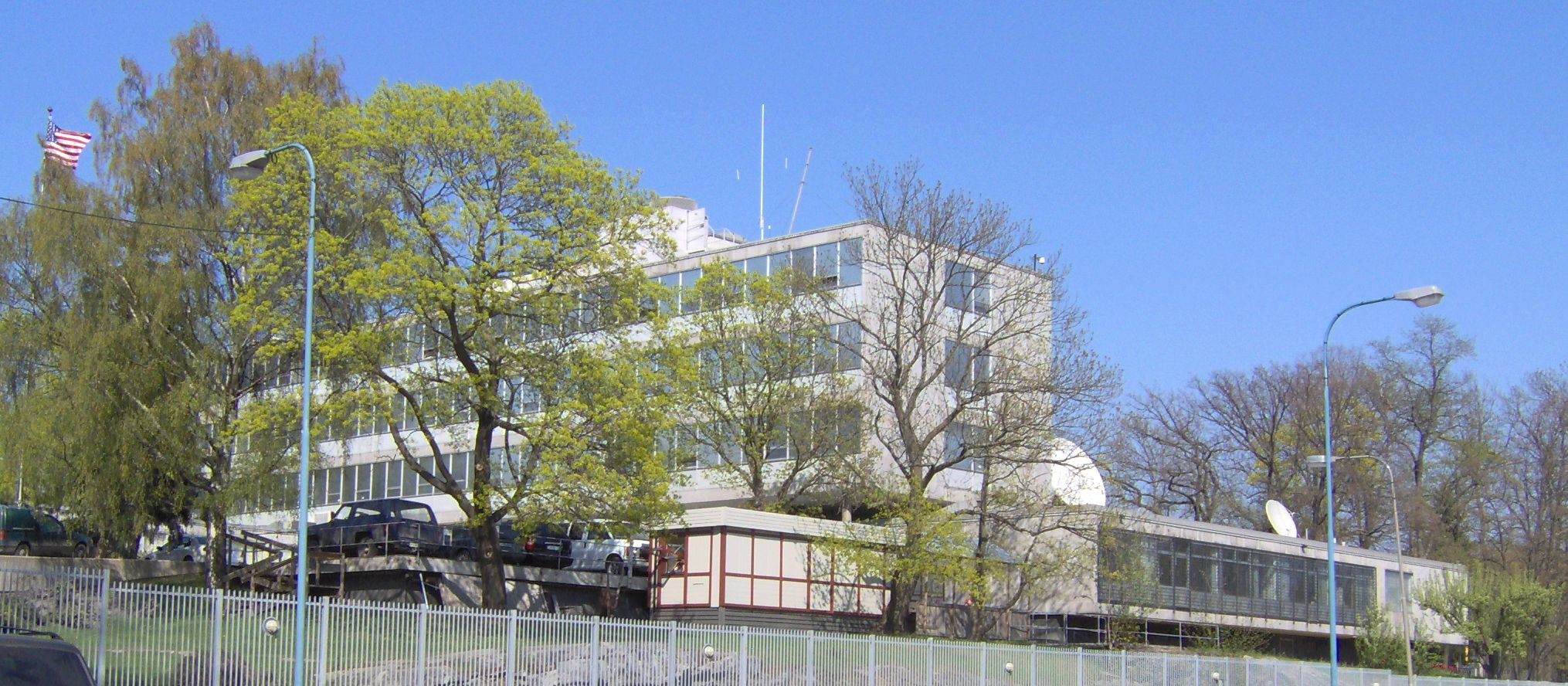
Embassy of the United States, Stockholm

The relations between the United States of America and the Kingdom of Sweden reach back to the days of the American Revolutionary War. The Kingdom of Sweden was the first country not formally engaged in the conflict (although around a hundred Swedish volunteers partook on the side of the Patriots) to recognize the United States before the Treaty of Paris. The Treaty of Amity and Commerce was signed subsequently in 1783 between Benjamin Franklin and Swedish representative Gustaf Philip Creutz.

In the 19th century, relations were largely cordial. Masses of Swedes emigrated to the United States from the 1840s–1920s, estimated at around a quarter of the Swedish population. The immigrants were eager for the promise of opportunity and land; many settled in the American Midwest. The result was a substantial Swedish American population. In the 20th century, the countries were fellow democracies (with the end of the Swedish monarchy's power after World War I) and maintained cordial if distant relations. Sweden maintained official neutrality but supplied nearby Nazi Germany during World War II, causing some tension with the Allies.

During the Cold War, Sweden did not join NATO and maintained a neutral status between the Western and Eastern Bloc, although its democratic and mixed capitalist approach was generally more in tune with the West and the United States. After the end of the Vietnam War, which was deeply unpopular in Sweden, relations between the two countries improved. The two countries have been largely friendly, and the United States supported Sweden's NATO membership. Under a comprehensive mandate, Sweden's nonalignment policy has led it to serve as the protecting power for the United States and to represent Washington in North Korea on consular matters. On 3 August 2022, the U.S. Senate unanimously approved Finland and Sweden's accession bids to join NATO. U.S. President Joe Biden approved the NATO membership of Finland and Sweden in August 2022.

Sweden's accession into NATO was finalized on 7 March 2024. The United States has observer status with the regional BEAC and CBSS.

== History ==
=== Colonies and early United States ===
Like many European powers, Sweden participated in the colonization of North America that started in the 17th century. The first Swedish colony along the banks of the Delaware River was established in 1638 (see New Sweden).

Sweden under king Gustavus III was the first country not formally engaged in the American Revolutionary War to recognize the young American republic. Swedish forces, and especially officers, served on the pro-American side, mainly in Swedish uniforms. The Swedish Count Axel von Fersen was a distinguished soldier during the war, serving as an interpreter between General Rochambeau and General Washington before the surrender at Yorktown. Also the Swedish count Curt von Stedingk, took part in the siege of Grenada and led the vanguard during the second assault during the Siege of Savannah in 1779. Stedingk was badly wounded and both were made members of the Society of the Cincinnati. One of the most famous names in Gustavian military history, Georg Carl von Döbeln, volunteered in the American theatre in 1781 but, due to numerous storms, ended up in the Cape Colony and Mauritius instead.

It is argued that the contributions of Sweden were the largest of any formally neutral country, and although Gustavian Sweden was frequently held as a French "appendage", the American press were consistently pro-Swedish, with the The Providence Gazette claiming in 1782 - before the peace - that Gustav had asked for an American ambassador be sent to Stockholm. As a whole, over a thousand Swedes fought in the conflict in the Royal Suedois, although mainly concentrated to Gibraltar. Numbers of volunteers in North America, mainly in the Georgia campaign, are unknown but are estimated in the hundreds. For comparison, about 6,000 to 7,000 Frenchmen at most were engaged under Rochambeau and other French commanders, and very few Dutch, a republic and formal ally to the United States.

Directly after the Treaty of Paris in 1783, the United States' Ambassador to Paris, Benjamin Franklin, and the Swedish Ambassador, Count Gustaf Philip Creutz, signed a Treaty of Amity and Commerce. The recognition of the American republic was hence the first from any formally non-belligerent party, as was later cited by president Donald Trump in 2018 during a joint press conference with Prime Minister Stefan Löfvén as a recognition of the long-standing relations. Creutz became President of the Chancellery (the head of government) shortly after, recognising Gustav's strong belief in the American Revolutionary cause, a project he had expressed mixed feelings on before as a fervent monarchist but harbouring strong anti-British sentiments and an admiration for American patriotic fervour and strive for independence.

From 1801-02, Sweden was allied with the United States during the First Barbary War, and a joint Swedish-American navy under Rudolf Cederström fought against the Barbary corsairs to prevent further disruption of trade in the Mediterranean Sea.

=== Emigration ===
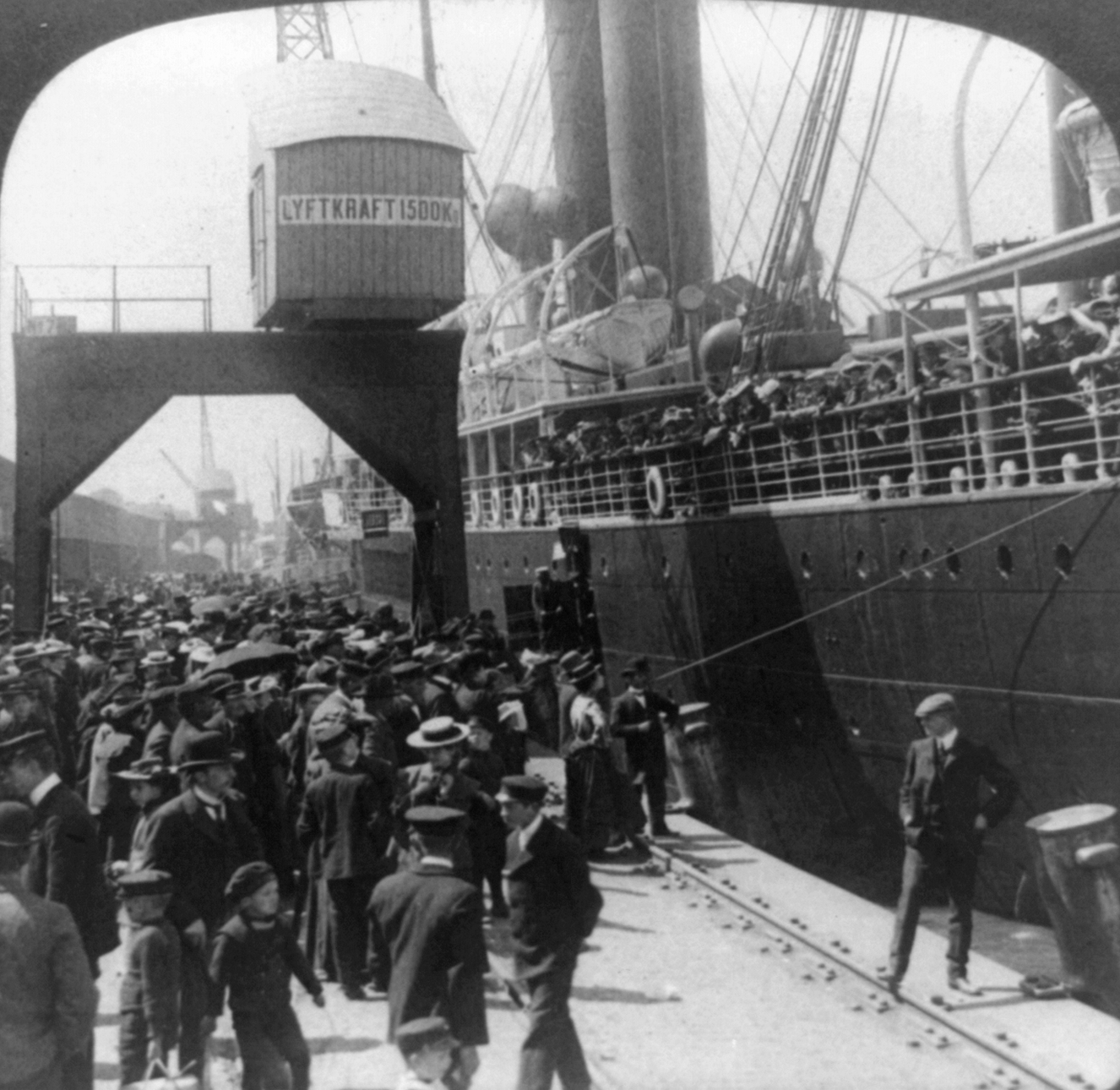
A ship leaving the port in Gothenburg, Sweden, on its way to America.

During the period between 1820–1930 approximately 1.3 million Swedes, a third of the country's population, emigrated to North America and most of them to the United States. Like the Irish diaspora it was sparked by poverty in Sweden, which was exacerbated during bad years. Only Britain (especially Ireland) and Norway had a higher emigration rate. Most of the Swedish emigrants settled in the central and Western United States. By 1910, Chicago had a greater population of Swedes than Gothenburg. Minnesota was also a place where many Swedish emigrants settled. The majority of Swedish-Americans fought in the American Civil War on the Union side. (See also John Ericsson USS Monitor)

In 1938, on the tercentenary of New Sweden, the Delaware monument was inaugurated by President Franklin D. Roosevelt and Prince Bertil of Sweden. Roosevelt said in his speech:

Nor have we as Americans forgotten that after the War of the Revolution, Sweden was the first neutral European power to negotiate a treaty of amity and trade with our young and struggling nation. All these things we Americans recall today with grateful hearts.

=== Worsening relations ===
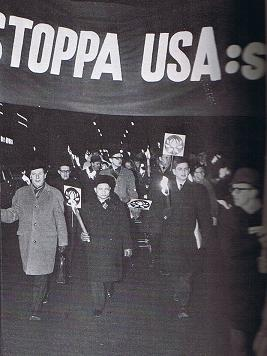
Olof Palme demonstrating side by side with North Vietnam ambassador Nguyen Tho Chan on February 21, 1968 in Stockholm.

The first Swedish head of government who met with a US President was Prime Minister Tage Erlander, who visited Harry S. Truman at the White House in 1952.

The period between 1960 and 1968 also marked a cold period in the political relations between Sweden and the U.S., mainly due to the Swedish government's vocal opposition to the Vietnam War. In February 1968, the US recalled its Ambassador from Sweden after the Swedish Minister of Education and future prime minister Olof Palme, a Social Democrat, had participated in a protest in Stockholm against the war together with the North Vietnamese Ambassador to the Soviet Union Nguyen Tho Chan. The post of US Ambassador to Sweden remained vacant until February 1970. In December 1972, Olof Palme (then Prime Minister) made a speech on Swedish national radio where he compared the ongoing US bombings of Hanoi to some of the worst atrocities committed by the Nazis. The US government called the comparison a "gross insult" and once again decided to freeze its diplomatic relations with Sweden (this time the freeze lasted for over a year).

=== Warmer period ===
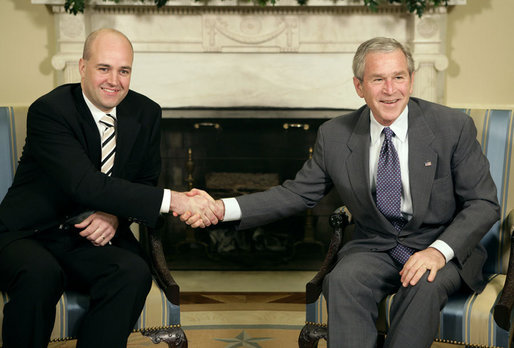
Swedish Prime Minister Fredrik Reinfeldt and US President George W. Bush at the White House on May 15, 2007.

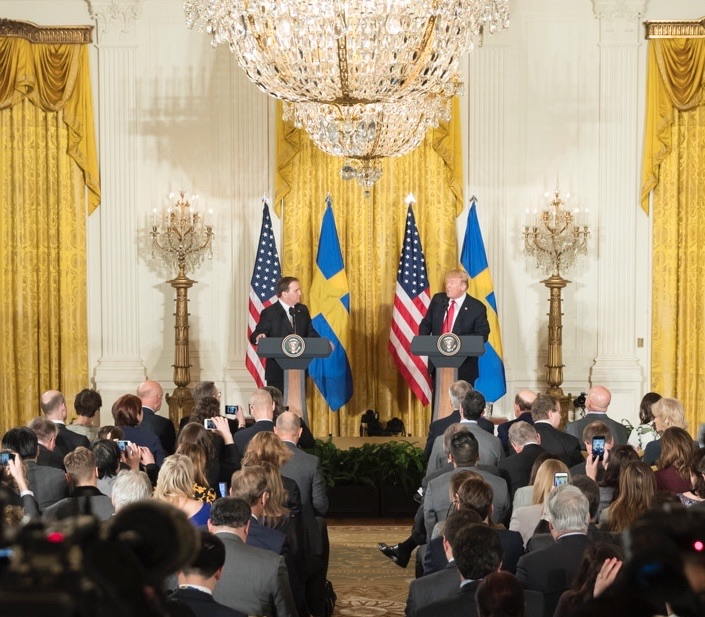
President Trump and Swedish Prime Minister Löfven give a joint statement at the White House in March 2018

Relations improved when Thorbjörn Fälldin became Swedish prime minister in 1976, and following the assassination of Olof Palme in 1986 and the succession of Ingvar Carlsson as new Prime Minister, Swedish-American relations improved. Ingvar Carlsson met with President Ronald Reagan in 1987, the first time that a Swedish Prime Minister was invited to the White House since 1961, when Erlander paid a visit to Kennedy.

Carlsson's successor as Prime Minister, Carl Bildt, visited both President George H. W. Bush in 1992 and President Bill Clinton in 1994.

Immediately after the September 11, 2001 attacks, the Swedish government expressed its sympathies with the U.S. and supported the U.S.-led invasion of Afghanistan. However, like many other European governments, Sweden opposed the 2003 invasion of Iraq, reasoning that the invasion was a breach of international law. However, Prime Minister Göran Persson was relatively mild in his criticism of the U.S. compared to Olof Palme's strong criticism during the Vietnam War.

In the Statement of Government Policy presented to the Riksdag on October 6, 2006, the new centre-right Prime Minister Fredrik Reinfeldt declared that the new government will work for a "strengthening of the transatlantic link". Reinfeldt's party, the Moderate Party, is more pro-American than the social democrats and supported the 2003 invasion of Iraq and Swedish membership of NATO. Reinfeldt visited President Bush at the White House on May 15, 2007.

According to a 2012 Gallup poll, 36% of Swedes approve of U.S. leadership, with 30% disapproving and 34% uncertain.

Following President Donald Trump's first 2020 presidential campaign rally at which he referred to "what's happening last night in Sweden" the Swedish government requested clarification from the U.S. State Department in regards to Trump's understanding of what was going on in Sweden. On February 19, the Cabinet of Sweden requested an explanation from the White House and the Swedish Embassy in the United States offered to inform the US administration in the future about Swedish immigration and integration policies. On February 23, the Swedish Ministry for Foreign Affairs referred to discussions about Sweden's refugee policies as "simplistic and occasionally completely inaccurate." On March 6, 2018 Prime Minister Stefan Löfven visited the United States and met with President Donald Trump.

In June 2019, American rapper ASAP Rocky, real name Rakim Mayers, was arrested and held on remand in Sweden over a physical altercation in Stockholm. President Donald Trump made several tweets where he demanded that the Swedish government release Mayers. A spokesperson for prime minister Löfven released a statement in response to Trump's request which stated that the government was not allowed to influence legal proceedings in Sweden and that "everyone is equal before the law".

== Economic relations ==
The United States and Sweden have strong economic relations. The United States is, as of 2022, the third-largest Swedish export trade partner, and U.S. companies are the most represented foreign companies in Sweden.

== Military relations ==
Although Sweden has a longstanding policy of political neutrality in international affairs, Sweden decided to apply for full membership of NATO in May 2022, following the Russian invasion of Ukraine. Sweden is a participant in the Euro-Atlantic Partnership Council. Sweden currently participates with around 500 troops in the International Security Assistance Force (ISAF), under the command of NATO, in Afghanistan. Four parties represented in the Parliament, the centre-right Alliance, support NATO membership. During the Libyan Civil War of 2011, the Swedish Air Force worked closely with NATO and the USA.

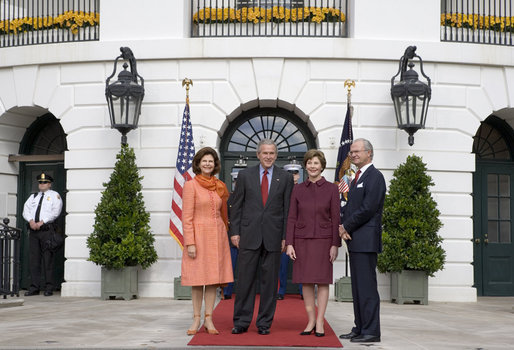
President George W. Bush and Laura Bush welcome King Carl XVI Gustaf and Queen Silvia of Sweden to the White House.

During the Cold War, the Swedish government secretly made preparations to receive military aid from the United States in case of Soviet aggression.

Sweden also aided the US in secrecy, possibly most famously when four Swedish pilots were awarded US Air Medals for saving the highly classified Lockheed SR-71 Blackbird spy plane from Soviet hands. The US pilots of the SR-71 stated that had Sweden not intervened and escorted the plane to safety on 29 June 1987, a dramatic escalation to the Cold War could have occurred through an international crisis. The event was classified for over 30 years, and when the report was unsealed, data from the NSA showed that several MiG-25s had been dispatched with the order to shoot down the SR-71 or force it to land after it had gotten an engine failure. A MiG-25 had locked a missile on the damaged SR-71, but as the aircraft was under escort by the Swedish Saab 37 Viggen pilots no missiles were fired. On 29 November 2018, the four Swedish pilots involved were awarded medals from the US Air Force.

== Cultural links ==
Reflecting the fact that Sweden has a higher proportion of English speakers than most other countries which were never part of the British Empire, Swedish producers and songwriters have played a significant role in the sound of American pop music since the 1990s. One in particular, Max Martin, has written and produced more Billboard Hot 100 number one hits than any American songwriter or producer.

== Public opinions ==
According to a 2026 Pew Research Center survey, 19% of Swedes had a favorable view of the United States, while 80% had a negative view, one of the most negative of 36 countries being surveyed.

== List of visits ==
| Guest | Host | Place of visit | Date of visit |
|---|---|---|---|
| Crown Prince Gustaf Adolf - Later King Gustaf VI Adolf of Sweden. | (United States) President Calvin Coolidge | John Ericsson National Memorial & The White House, Washington, D.C. | May 29, 1926 |
| (Sweden) Prince Bertil, Duke of Halland (Sweden) Crown Princess Louise | (United States) President Franklin D. Roosevelt | Wilmington, Delaware; Springwood, Hyde Park, New York | June 27, 1938; July 1, 1938 |
| (Sweden) Prime Minister Tage Erlander | (United States) President Harry S. Truman | White House, Washington, D.C. | April 14, 1952 |
| (Sweden) Prime Minister Tage Erlander | (United States) President Dwight D. Eisenhower | White House, Washington, D.C. | November 24, 1954 |
| (Sweden) Prime Minister Tage Erlander | (United States) President John F. Kennedy | White House, Washington, D.C. | March 29, 1961 |
| (United States) Vice President Lyndon B. Johnson | (Sweden) King Gustaf VI Adolf | Uppsala Cathedral & Uppsala Castle, Uppsala, Sweden | September 29, 1961 |
| (United States) Vice President Lyndon B. Johnson | (Sweden) King Gustaf VI Adolf (Sweden) Prime Minister Tage Erlander | Sofiero Palace, Helsingborg, Sweden; Kanslihuset, Stockholm, Sweden | September 4, 1963; September 5, 1963 |
| (Sweden) Prime Minister Tage Erlander (Sweden) Prince Bertil, Duke of Halland | (United States) President Lyndon B. Johnson (United States) Mrs. John F. Kennedy | Cathedral of St. Matthews & The White House, Washington, D.C. | November 25, 1963 |
| (Sweden) King Carl XVI Gustaf | (United States) President Gerald Ford | White House, Washington, D.C. | April 5, 1976 |
| (Sweden) Prime Minister Ola Ullsten | (United States) President Jimmy Carter (United States) Vice President Walter Mondale | White House, Washington, D.C. | January 18, 1979 |
| (United States) Vice President Walter Mondale | (Sweden) Prime Minister Ola Ullsten | Kanslihuset, Stockholm, Sweden | May 1979 |
| (Sweden) King Carl XVI Gustaf | (United States) President Ronald Reagan | White House, Washington, D.C. | November 22, 1981 |
| (United States) Vice President George H. W. Bush | (Sweden) Prime Minister Olof Palme | Rosenbad, Stockholm, Sweden | June 27, 1983 |
| (United States) First Lady Nancy Reagan | (Sweden) King Carl XVI Gustaf | Stockholm, Sweden | June 1987 |
| (Sweden) Prime Minister Ingvar Carlsson | (United States) President Ronald Reagan | White House, Washington, D.C. | September 9, 1987 |
| (Sweden) King Carl XVI Gustaf | (United States) President Ronald Reagan | White House, Washington, D.C. | April 11, 1988 |
| (Sweden) Prime Minister Carl Bildt | (United States) President George H. W. Bush | White House, Washington, D.C. | February 20, 1992 |
| (Sweden) Prime Minister Carl Bildt | (United States) President Bill Clinton | White House, Washington, D.C. | December 1, 1993 |
| (Sweden) Prime Minister Göran Persson | (United States) President Bill Clinton | White House, Washington, D.C. | August 6, 1996 |
| (United States) President George W. Bush | (Sweden) King Carl XVI Gustaf (Sweden) Prime Minister Göran Persson | Gunnebo Slott, Residenset & Svenska Mässan, Gothenburg, Sweden | June 14, 2001 |
| (Sweden) Prime Minister Göran Persson | (United States) President George W. Bush | White House, Washington, D.C. | December 3, 2001 |
| (Sweden) Prime Minister Göran Persson | (United States) President George W. Bush | White House, Washington, D.C. | April 28, 2004 |
| (Sweden) King Carl XVI Gustaf | (United States) President George W. Bush | White House, Washington, D.C. | October 23, 2006 |
| (Sweden) Prime Minister Fredrik Reinfeldt | (United States) President George W. Bush | White House, Washington, D.C. | May 15, 2007 |
| (Sweden) Prime Minister Fredrik Reinfeldt | (United States) President Barack Obama | White House, Washington, D.C. | November 2, 2009 |
| (United States) President Barack Obama | (Sweden) King Carl XVI Gustaf (Sweden) Prime Minister Fredrik Reinfeldt | Rosenbad, Royal Institute of Technology, Stockholm Synagogue & the Royal Palace, Stockholm, Sweden | September 4–5, 2013 |
| (Sweden) Prime Minister Stefan Löfven | (United States) President Barack Obama | White House & Arlington National Cemetery, Washington, D.C. | May 13, 2016 |
| (United States) Vice President Joe Biden | (Sweden) Prime Minister Stefan Löfven | Kanslihuset, Stockholm, Sweden | August 25, 2016 |
| (Sweden) Prime Minister Stefan Löfven | (United States) President Donald Trump | White House, Washington, D.C. | March 6, 2018 |
| (Sweden) Prime Minister Magdalena Andersson | (United States) President Joe Biden | White House, Washington, D.C. | March 16, 2022 |
| (Sweden) Prime Minister Ulf Kristersson | (United States) President Joe Biden | White House, Washington, D.C. | July 5, 2023 |
| (Sweden) Prime Minister Ulf Kristersson | (United States) President Joe Biden | White House & Congress, Washington, D.C. | March 7, 2024 |
| (Sweden) Prime Minister Ulf Kristersson | (United States) President Joe Biden | Walter E. Washington Convention Center, Washington, D.C. | July 9–11, 2024 |

== See also ==
- Foreign relations of Sweden
- Foreign relations of the United States
- United States-EU relations
- NATO-EU relations
- Embassy of Sweden, Washington, D.C.
- Ambassadors of Sweden to the United States
- Ambassadors of the United States to Sweden
- Swedish response to Hurricane Katrina
- Swedish Americans
