= Sophia Rosenhane =

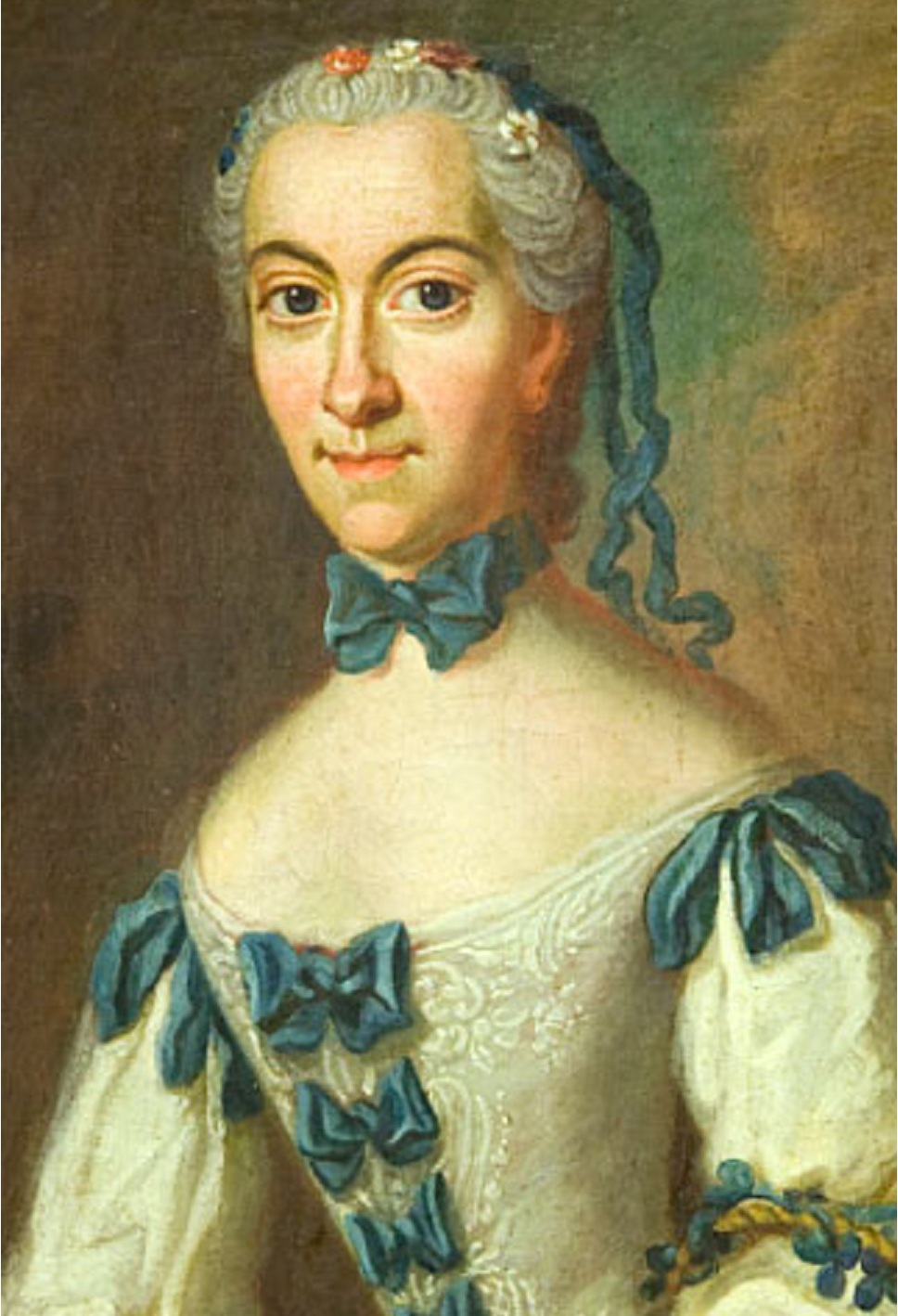
- Sophia Rosenhane
- Born: 29 August 1757
- Died: 21 August 1837 (aged 79)
- Occupation(s): Swedish patronage and noblewoman

Sophia Eleonora Rosenhane, as married Jennings, (29 August 1757 – 21 August 1837) was a Swedish patron and noblewoman. At the national portrait gallery at Gripsholm Castle, her portrait was featured amongst six of the most famous Swedish women in history. She became known as a financier and respected patron of the arts. After her death she was buried at the family grave in Husby-Oppunda.

== Life ==
She was the sister of state secretary Schering Rosenhane and lived at Täckhammar in Södermanland. Täckhammar was the place closest to her childhood home Tistad Castle outside of Nyköping. During her childhood, she was the playmate of Princess Sophie Albertine of Sweden. Reportedly, she was also very well regarded by the queen, Sophia Magdalena of Denmark.

Rosenhane was married on 17 June 1802 to Marshal of the Court Johan Jakob Frans Jennings. The marriage was childless and her husband died in Stockholm in 1828. According to a contemporary description, she was known "as excellent for her educated good sense as for her noble heart", and became known as a financier and respected patron of the arts. In 1826-27, she and her spouse jointly donated a large part of the Rosenhane Library, which treated the subject of history, literature and language of Scandinavia and Sweden i particular, to the Royal Swedish Academy of Letters, History and Antiquities, Uppsala university and Strängnäs College.

In the first National Portrait Gallery (Sweden) of Gripsholm, which was opened in the 1822, her portrait was featured among six of the most famous Swedish women in history along with Bridget of Sweden, Barbro Stigsdotter, Hedvig Charlotta Nordenflycht, Sophia Elisabet Brenner and Vendela Skytte.

When Sophia Rosenhane died in 1837 her friherre name Rosenhane also died with her. She was buried at the family grave in Husby-Oppunda church.
