= Johan Gabriel Oxenstierna =

Swedish poet

His Excellency The High Well-born Count Johan Gabriel Oxenstierna
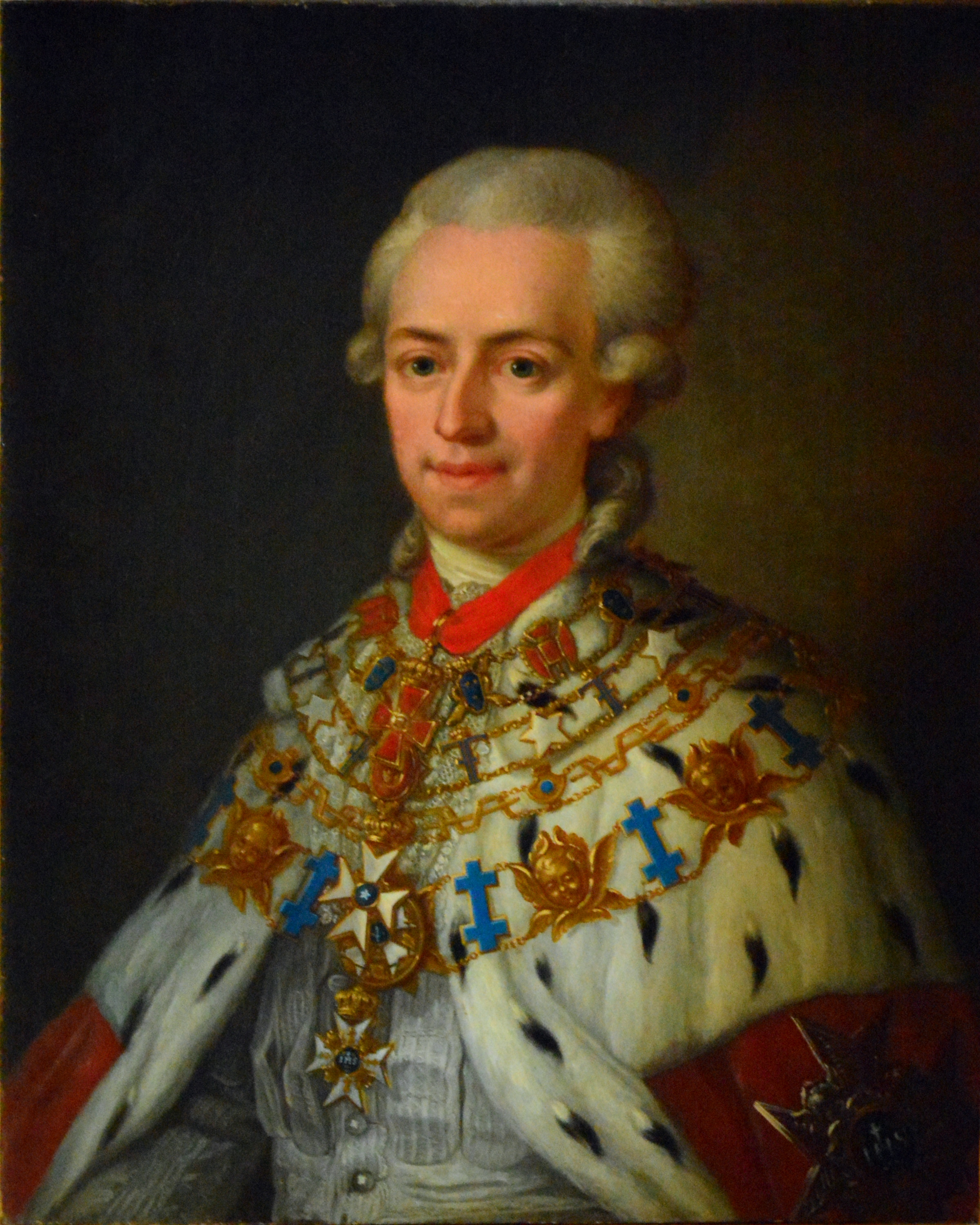
- Born: 19 July 1750; Skenäs, Södermanland, Sweden
- Died: 29 July 1818 (aged 68); Stockholm, Sweden
- Education: Kansliexamen, 1767
- Alma mater: Uppsala university
- Occupations: Poet, Diplomat, Courtier, Member of the Privy Council of Sweden
- Spouse: Lovisa Kristina Wachschlager (1791)
- Children: 1
- Relatives: Gustaf Fredrik Gyllenborg; Nils Philip Gyldenstolpe
- Writing career
- Period: 1769–1815
- Genres: Poetry, Diary
- Notable works: Natten 1769, Morgonen (1772), Skördarne (1796), Dagens stunder (1805)
- Notable awards: Lord of the Realm, Member of the Swedish Academy, Member of the Royal Swedish Academy of Sciences, Knight of the Royal Order of the Seraphim

Count Johan Gabriel Oxenstierna (19 July 1750 – 29 July 1818) is considered one of the foremost Swedish poets of the Gustavian period. A prominent courtier during the reign of King Gustav III of Sweden, he was also a politician, diplomat and member of the Swedish Academy, holding seat number 8. On several occasions he was a member of the Swedish Government and Parliament. Amongst other things, Oxenstierna is also known for his translation into Swedish of John Milton's epic blank verse poem Paradise Lost.

== Early life ==
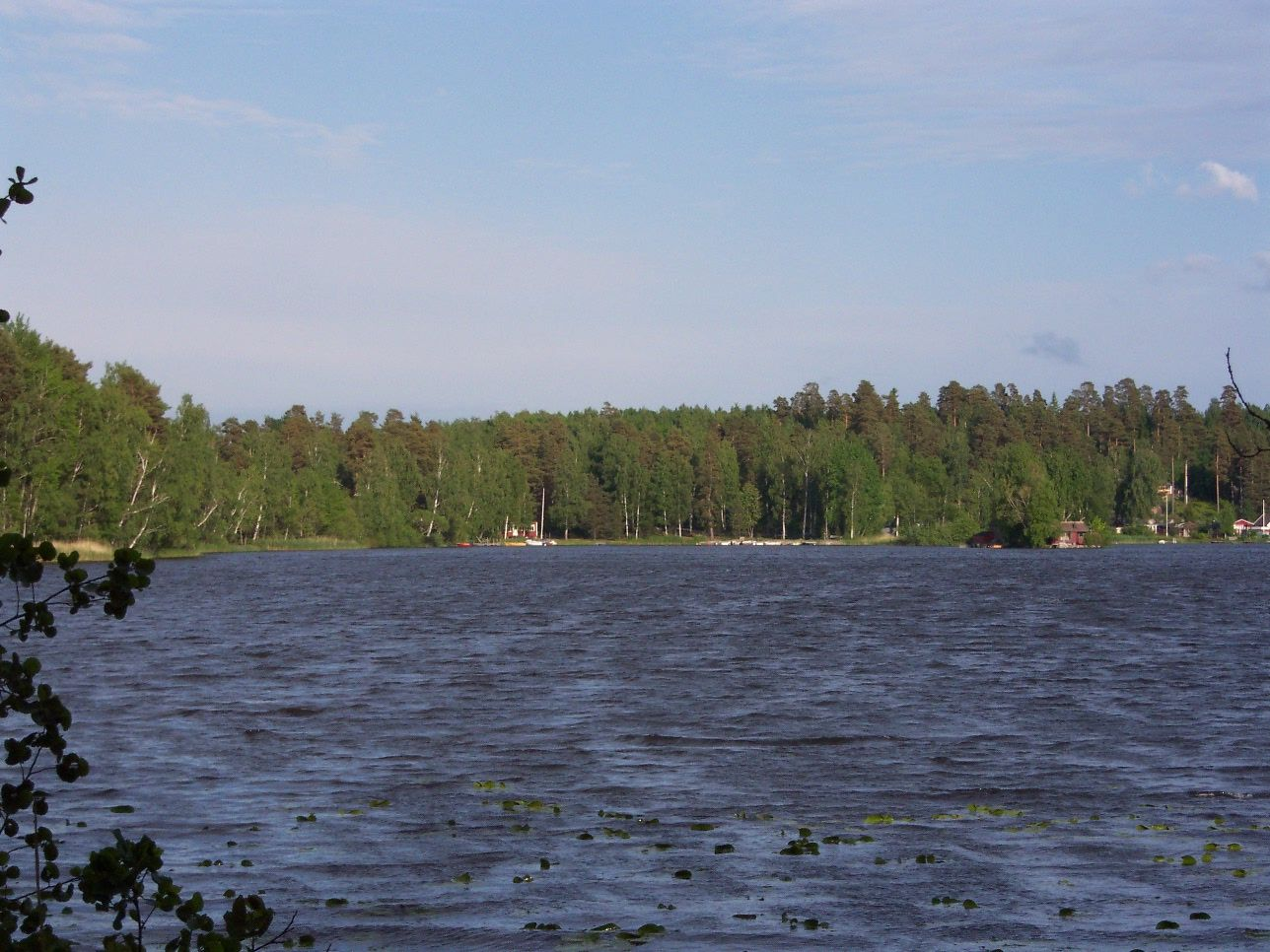
A view of lake Kolsnaren, by which Oxenstiernas childhood home is found.

Johan Gabriel Oxenstierna was born at the Skenäs estate, by lake Kolsnaren (now in Vingåker Municipality), in the province of Södermanland. He lived here during his youth with his parents, major general count Göran Oxenstierna, a member of the Korsholm och Wasa branch of the Oxenstierna family, and countess Sara Gyllenborg, and with his grandparents, Margareta Gyllenborg (née von Beijer) and Jan Gyllenborg. The grandparents took active part in the upbringing of young Johan Gabriel - the grandfather until he died in 1752 - as the parents at times resided at Carlsten, due to the fathers military career. He was the oldest of four brothers.

His childhood at Skenäs came to play a leading role in his later authorship in many ways. The beauty of the nature of Södermanland, and the memories of his upbringing there, came to inspire the themes of his pre-romantic publications. His maternal uncle, poet Gustaf Fredrik Gyllenborg, in whose house he spent a lot of time, and his tutor, poet Olof Bergklint, came to inspire his career choice as a poet, as well as his poetry in itself. A person, whose writings he read and admired during this time, and who came to inspire him, was poet Gustaf Philip Creutz.

In 1762 he was enrolled as a student at Uppsala University, from which he graduated in 1767 with an administrative degree ("kansliexamen"). Bergklint served as a tutor for his university studies, starting in 1764. During his studies he lived, at times, in Uppsala.

Although Oxenstierna's writings were not published until after he moved from Skenäs and started working, he did write a Diary between 1766 and 1768, which was published in 1965 by Bokgillet publishers in Uppsala under the title Ljuva ungdomstid: Dagbok 1766–1768 (Sweet Time of Youth: Diary 1766–1768). In it he makes everyday observations of his life at Skenäs, and later in Uppsala and Stockholm. The diary, which was written in French, reveals a melancholic and emotional character and a deep interest in nature and poetry, rather than the rational philosophy of that time.

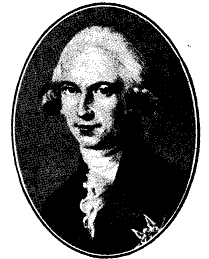
Johan Gabriel Oxenstierna

== Public career ==
Like his father and three brothers, Oxenstierna embarked upon a career in the public sector. After graduating from Uppsala, and after a successful disputation, in front of the royal court, he was employed at the Royal Chancellery, in the department for foreign correspondence. During this time he resided with his uncle, Gustaf Gyllenborg. He was appointed acting Commission Secretary in Vienna in 1770, and made the regular Commission Secretary in that city in 1772; the year of king Gustav III's coup d'etat and the establishment of absolute monarchy in Sweden. He seems to have been rather uninterested in his diplomatic work in Vienna, and more interested in his poetry and in a letter exchange with an Austrian lady, which showed clear Rousseauan influence.

In 1774 he was recalled to Stockholm by the king and made a Chamberlain. He had hoped for a position at the Swedish legation in Paris, but instead received the titular office of second secretary of the Presidential office (i.e. the department for foreign affairs). As a chamberlain his poetic talents came to use, and brought him closer to the king, who was particularly enthused by his ability to write and speak in French. As a result of the king's trust in him, he was sent on diplomatic missions to several German states in 1778. He was made a senior Chamberlain in 1783 and a Member of the College of the Chancellery in 1785, with a special assignment to work with matters relating to Pomerania and Wismar. In 1786, the king made him a member of the Privy Council of Sweden and president of the College of the Chancellery, together with Emanuel De Geer. As president of the Chancellery Oxenstierna was the head of the Privy Council and responsible for relating matters of foreign policy to the king.

When the Privy Council was dissolved and the office of College of the Chancellery abolished in 1789, he was made Head Steward for the queen, and in the absence of the king during the Russo-Swedish War (1788–1790), he was a member of the Cabinet. During this time, believing the king was about to abdicate, he worked to form an alliance with other nobles and Duke Charles to force the king to make peace with Russia and go into a defensive alliance with Denmark and Russia. The king, however, remained on the throne until his assassination in 1792, shortly before which Oxenstierna was made a Riksmarskalk ("Marshal of the Kingdom"). After the king's death, he left all public offices, but remained as a Marshal at the court.

After king Gustav's death he temporarily fell from grace with the new rulers. He made a short comeback as a cabinet member in 1798 and 1799, while king Gustav IV Adolf travelled through Europe. In 1801 he stepped down as Riksmarskalk and was without any political influence until after the revolution of 1809, which deposed king Gustav IV Adolf and introduced the Constitution of 1809. Oxenstierna disliked the revolution, but accepted being chairman of a committee during the Parliament of 1809, and again in 1815. However, he was not in any way an influential politician.

Oxenstierna was never a formidable politician or diplomat. As mentioned before, he showed a distinct lack of interest already during his first diplomatic mission in Vienna. The king often kept him uninformed and took care of business himself. Gustav III simply liked having an Oxenstierna by his side, because of the family's notability in matters of state since the days of Axel Oxenstierna. Oxenstierna often got distracted from his work, his mind wandering to more interesting matters, to the extent that he sometimes wrote public documents in verse. His contemporaries described him as "unsuitable for management" and as a Riksmarskalk he managed to misorganize both the funeral of king Gustav III and the coronation of the new king Charles XIII, drawing many complaints, even from the new king himself. He was not blind to this lack of administrative ability, and when he was suggested as President of the Chancellery he wrote to a friend: "This is insane and can never be, as I am not competent for this post."

He was elected a member of the Royal Swedish Academy of Sciences in 1804.

Cultural offices
Preceded by First holder	Swedish Academy, Seat No.8; 1786–1818	Succeeded by Esaias Tegnér
