= Americans in Sweden =

Ethnic group in Sweden

Amerikaner i Sverige

Total population
- c. 25,000–50,000; US-born residents 24,173 (2021)

Languages
- Swedish; American English; Spanish

Religion
- Protestantism; Judaism; Roman Catholicism

Related ethnic groups
- American diaspora

Americans in Sweden consists of immigrants and expatriates from the United States as well as Swedish people of American ancestry.

In 2021, there were 24,173 US-born people living in Sweden.

According to the organization Democrats Abroad Sweden in 2020, there were c. 40,000 American citizens in Sweden.

== See also ==
- Swedish Americans
- Sweden–United States relations
- Swedish emigration to the United States
