= Sophia Elisabet Brenner =

Swedish writer, poet, feminist and salon hostess

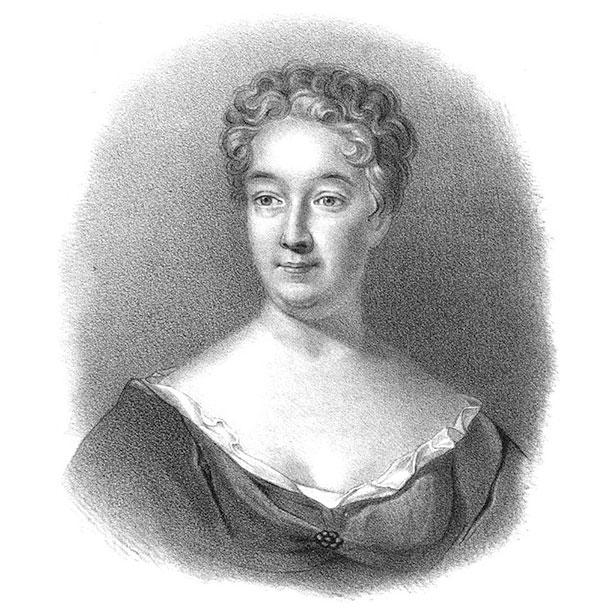
- Sophia Elisabet Brenner
- Born: 29 April 1659; Stockholm
- Died: 14 September 1730 (aged 71); Stockholm
- Other name: Sophia Elisabet Weber
- Known for: Swedish writer, poet, and salonist
- Spouse(s): Elias Brenner; 15 children

Sophia Elisabet Brenner (née Weber; 29 April 1659 – 14 September 1730) was a Swedish writer, poet, feminist and salon hostess.

== Biography ==
Sophia Elisabet Brenner was born to the builder Niklas Weber, who was a German immigrant, and Kristina Spoor.

She was given an unusually high education for a female in 17th-century Sweden. Being the child of a German immigrant, she could speak both German and Swedish, and she also studied Latin. She was enrolled in the German School for Boys in Stockholm. This was not unique – since 1575, girls were permitted as pupils in the first school classes in Sweden – but nevertheless not common: she was reportedly the only girl in her school. Later, further more, she studied at home, tutored by male academic tutors. One of her tutors was K. A. Zellinius, over whom she wrote a funeral poem in 1676. She learned six languages well enough to compose poetry in all of them.

In 1680, she married the miniaturist painter and official Elias Brenner. She became the mother of 15 children, only four of whom survived her. After her marriage, she became the hostess of a literary and artistic circle: among the elite frequenting the home of her and her spouse were the famous amateur actress Aurora Königsmarck, the painter Anna Maria Ehrenstrahl, the poet Johan Runius and the doctor and writer Urban Hjärne, known for his opposition to witch trials.

== Writer ==
Sophia Elisabet Brenner was encouraged by her spouse and his artistic friends to continue her studies and her writing during her marriage: she is known to be active as a writer from the year after her marriage until her death: the only older poem known is her funeral poem over her teacher in 1676.

She studied Dutch, French and Italian poetry, and produced poetry in all of these languages except Dutch: her most common language was however German. Her way of writing has been called more personal and concrete than was common in her time.

The majority of her poems treats weddings, funerals, congratulations and celebrations of public or private individuals, particularly women and children. She did not write for money and directed her poems to friends and benefactors. Among her own models of inspirations were the works of the Danish psalm writer Thomas Kingo, and the Swedish poets Samuel Columbus and Petrus Lagerlöf.

Sophia Elisabet Brenner represented a form of feminism fashionable in her time: in her poems, she defended women's rights to educate themselves as autodidacts at home and insisted that females were not intellectually inferior to males. She became known as a role model of a female scholar not only in Sweden but also abroad, especially in Germany, and was celebrated as such by the work Testimoniorum fasciculus, edited by Urban Hjärne. She was called the "Second Sappho" and the "Tenth muse", and was presented as a Swedish answer to other known female scholars in contemporary Europe.

She herself stated that her activity as a writer did not at all interfere with her duties as a spouse and parent, and that it was fully possible for her to do both.

During the Great Northern War, she expressed patriotism but also critically illustrated all the negative effects of wartime hardships.

Brenner has been called the first feminist in Sweden because of her poem Det Qwinliga Könetz rätmätige Förswar (The justified defense of the female sex) in 1693, believed to be inspired by her friendship with Aurora Köningsmarck. The work often mentioned as her best was the religions poem Wårs Herres och Frälsares Jesu Christi alldraheligaste pijons historia (The Most Holy Martyrdom of Our Lord and Savior Jesus Christ) from 1710. In 1713, she published a collection of all her poems, and thereby became the first woman to a published herself as a poet in the Swedish language.

She had the view that men and women were truly the same mentally and were different only in their physique and other appearance. She expressed this view in her coronation poem to the female monarch Ulrika Eleonora, Queen of Sweden in 1719:

It is truly indifferent what color the clothes of a master is,
or what they are called,
if he but knows how to save a ship,
and bring it from storms to harbor,
Our body is nothing but the clothes of our soul
which makes the only difference between he and she,
as for the soul concerned, it is just as good,
yes even better, in many woman's body

One of her works was a poem of admiration to the painter Anna Maria Ehrenstrahl, which also mentions her own activity as an artist and both of them as female artist pioneers:

If I of inborn instinct rimes for my pleasure,

Your inclination is made clear by your work.
Though art may sometimes cost us hours,
There is no better way to be remembered by.
Let envy grine against us, let death tense his bow,

For neither scare your pencil, nor my pen.

== Legacy ==
In the national National Portrait Gallery (Sweden) of Gripsholm, which was opened in the 1822, she was one of the first six women of the Swedish history who was given a portrait in the collection, along with Bridget of Sweden, Hedvig Charlotta Nordenflycht, Barbro Stigsdotter (Svinhufvud), Sophia Rosenhane and Vendela Skytte.

== See also ==
- Catharina Ahlgren
- Hedvig Catharina Lilje
