= Tankebyggarorden =

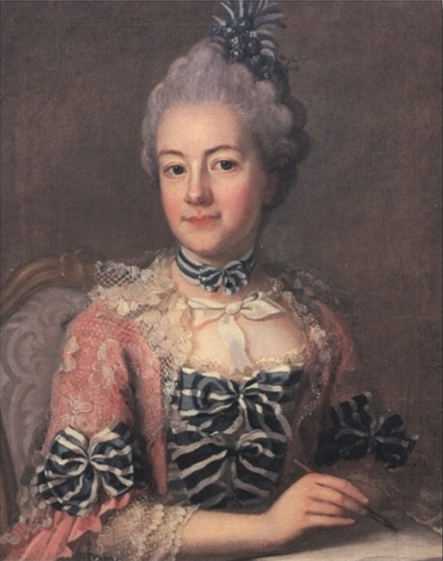
Hedvig Nordenflycht by Pasch

Tankebyggarorden (lit. 'Order of the Thought Builders') was a literary fellowship active in Sweden between 1753 and 1763.

Tankebyggarorden was established in Stockholm in 1753 by the Foreign Secretary Carl Friedrich Eckleff, an ardent Freemason, and Member of Parliament Anders Gottlieb Herkepaeus, and grew to 34 members, among whom the most famous are the poets Hedvig Charlotta Nordenflycht, Gustaf Philip Creutz and Gustaf Fredrik Gyllenborg.

They published a journal called Our experiments in three parts, 1753–1755. The collection contains outspoken satires (mostly Gyllenborg), directed against considerably old-fashioned, beautiful idyllic poetry (Creutz "Sommarqväde" and "Elegie", etc.), from elevated rhetorical didactics to frivolous little pieces.

The society was formed of a central coterie consisting of Nordenflycht and her inner circle. In 1763 Tankebyggarorden dissolved when Nordenflycht died and Creutz was ordered to Spain . A revival attempt in 1775 failed.
