= Royal Academy of Letters =

Royal Academy of Letters may refer to:

- Royal Swedish Academy of Letters, History and Antiquities
- Royal Danish Academy of Sciences and Letters
