= Barbro Stigsdotter =

Swedish noble

Barbro Stigsdotter (1472-1528), was a Swedish noble. She is famous for her part in the Vasasagan (Vasa Saga), the traditional national legend about the accession to the throne of King Gustav Vasa of Sweden.

Barbro Stigsdotter was the daughter of Stig Hansson, a Vogt of the mine Jönshyttan in Tuna, and married the noble Arent Persson of Ornäs.

According to the chronicle of Peder Swart, Gustav Vasa, who was hunted by the Danes, passed her home as a guest during his flight from the Danes in 1520. Her spouse was to have planned to have him taken prisoner and delivered to the Danes. Barbro Stigsdotter, however, warned Gustav Vasa, which made it possible for him to escape capture. As this eventually lead to Sweden becoming independent from the Danes with Vasa as its monarch, her act of loyalty made her a national heroine in the chronicle. There is another document that claims that it was not her spouse, but her father, whom she defied by thwarting his plans of delivering Vasa to the Danes. Except for the uncertainty on this detail, the account of her saving Gustav Vasa on this occasion is regarded to be genuine and accurate.

In the national National Portrait Gallery (Sweden) of Gripsholm, which was opened in the 1822, her portrait was featured among six of the most famous Swedish women in history along with Bridget of Sweden, Sophia Rosenhane, Hedvig Charlotta Nordenflycht, Sophia Elisabet Brenner and Vendela Skytte.
