= Rosenhan =

The following people are named Rosenhan:

- David Rosenhan, a psychologist
- Beata Rosenhane, feminist
- Schering Rosenhane, a former Governor of Stockholm
- Sophia Rosenhane, collector

Also:

- Rosenhan experiment, a noted experiment conducted by David Rosenhan
