= Elias Brenner =

Finnish artist (1647–1717)

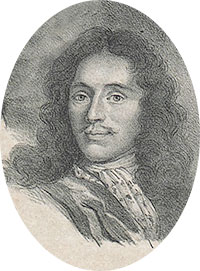
Elias Brenner (1847)

Elias Brenner (18 April 1647 – 16 January 1717) was a Finnish-born Swedish artist, draftsman and antiquarian. He is especially known for his work as a portrait miniaturist and a numismatist.

== Biography ==
Brenner was born in the parish of Storkyro in Ostrobothnia County, Finland. He was one of twenty children born to vicar Isaacus Henrici Brennerus and Susanna Werenberg. He first went to school in Nykarleby and Pori. In 1663, he was enrolled at Uppsala University where he first studied theology and later archeology. In 1668, he entered service as a draftsman in the Antiquity College (Antikvitetskollegium) which had been established at Uppsala by King Gustav II Adolf during 1667. He became a technical assistant and worked principally for Johan Hadorph (1630–1693) who was director-general of the Swedish National Heritage Board (Riksantikvarieämbetet). In 1673, he traveled along with Hadorph to join King Charles XI of Sweden on his extended Eriksgata which included a trip to Copenhagen.

In 1672 he resigned from his position to engage as a portrait miniaturist and conduct research as a numismatist. He was appointed miniature painter at the Royal Court of Sweden in 1677. He continued to paint until his death in 1717.

In 1691, his great work on Swedish coins Thesaurus nummorum Sveo-Gothicorum was printed. In the following year on a limited scale it began to be spread by the government as a gift to dignitaries and professionals. Its reception was very good and the book was mentioned with praise in foreign press. Brenner was appointed an extraordinary member of the Swedish Antiquity College in 1692 and received a considerable annual subsidy for his job of "further elaboration and perfection". The following year he was appointed Assessor there with a government salary. A new amended edition of Thesaurus was issued fourteen years after Brenner's death by Nils Piping. The number of images had then increased from 431 to 574, and histories of Swedish coin collectors and their collections had been added.

== Personal life ==
Brenner was married twice. In 1676, he married Erengerd Stamm (1656–1679). In 1680, he married Swedish writer, poet, and hostess Sophia Elisabet Brenner (1659–1730). He died in Stockholm during 1717 and was buried at Riddarholm Church in Stockholm.

== Gallery ==
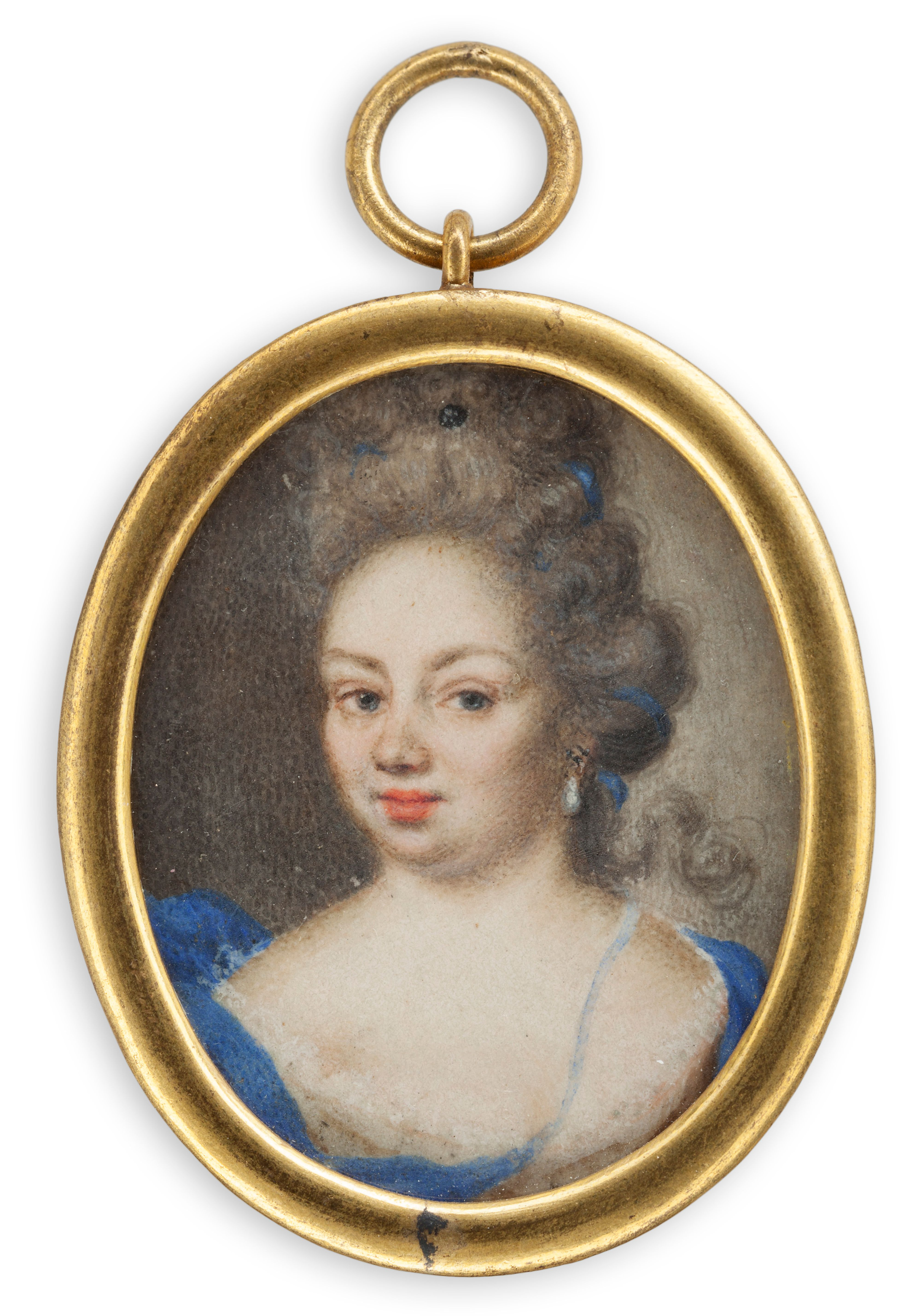
Portrait of a lady

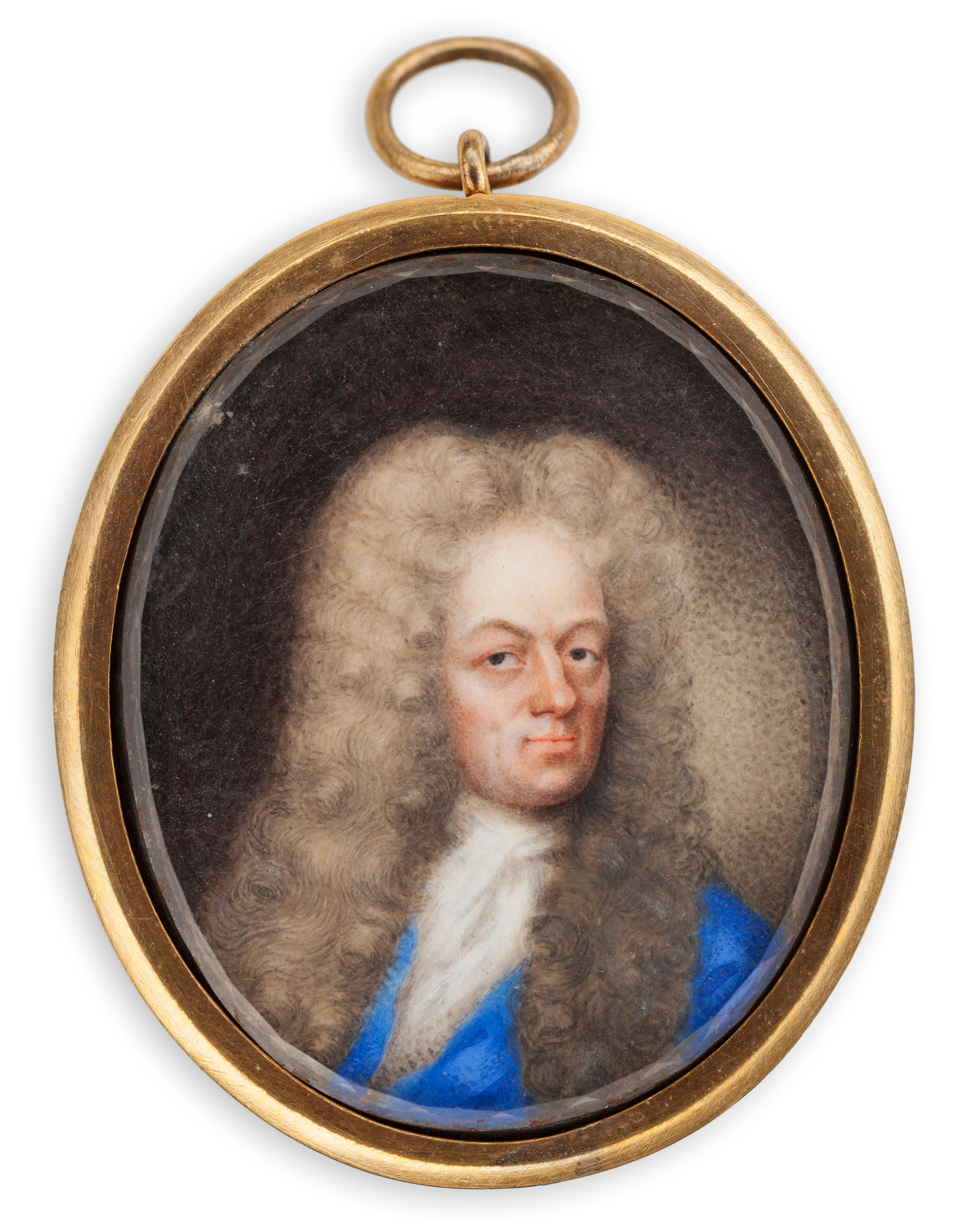
Nicodemus Tessin the younger

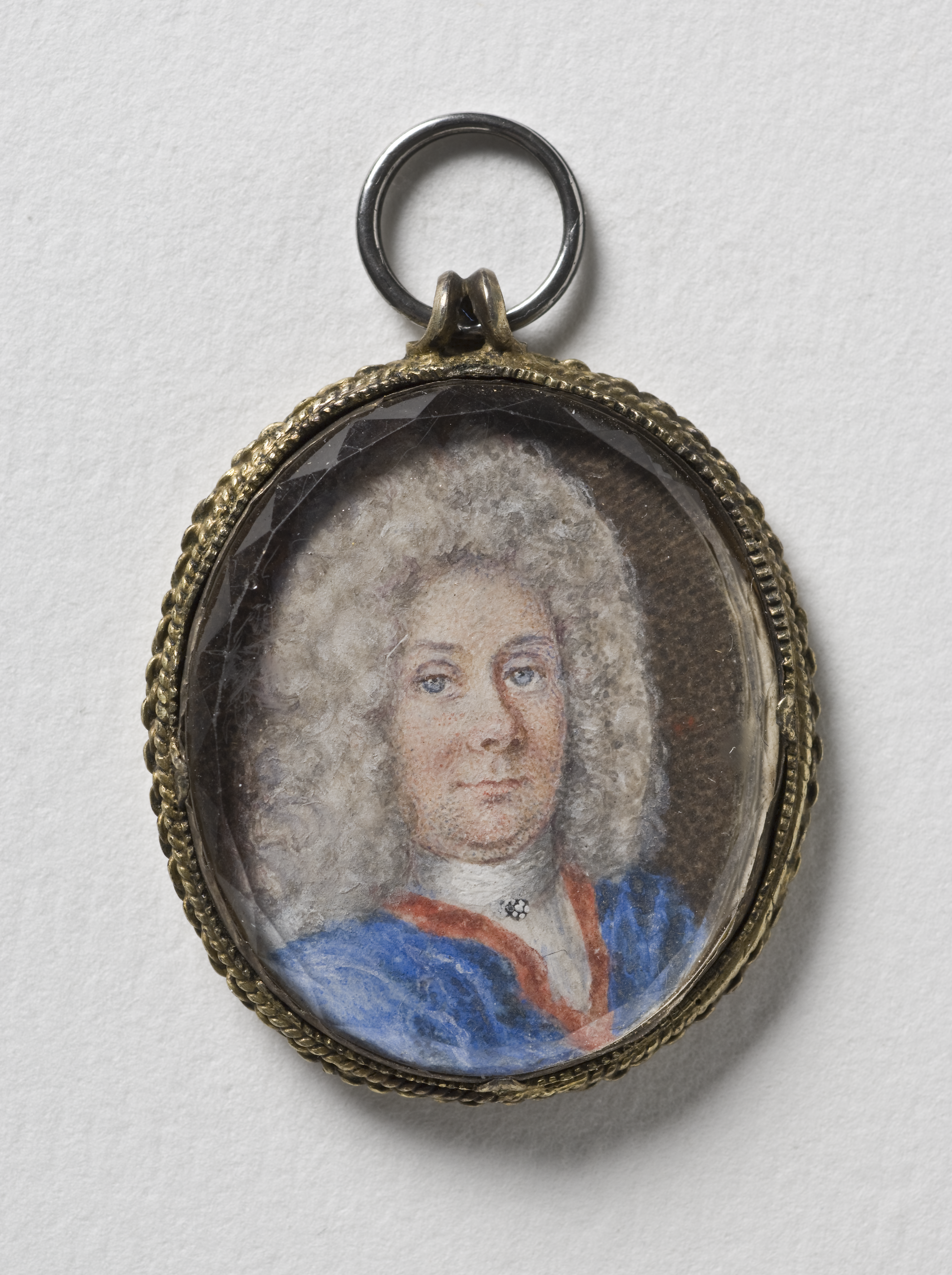
Portrait of a man

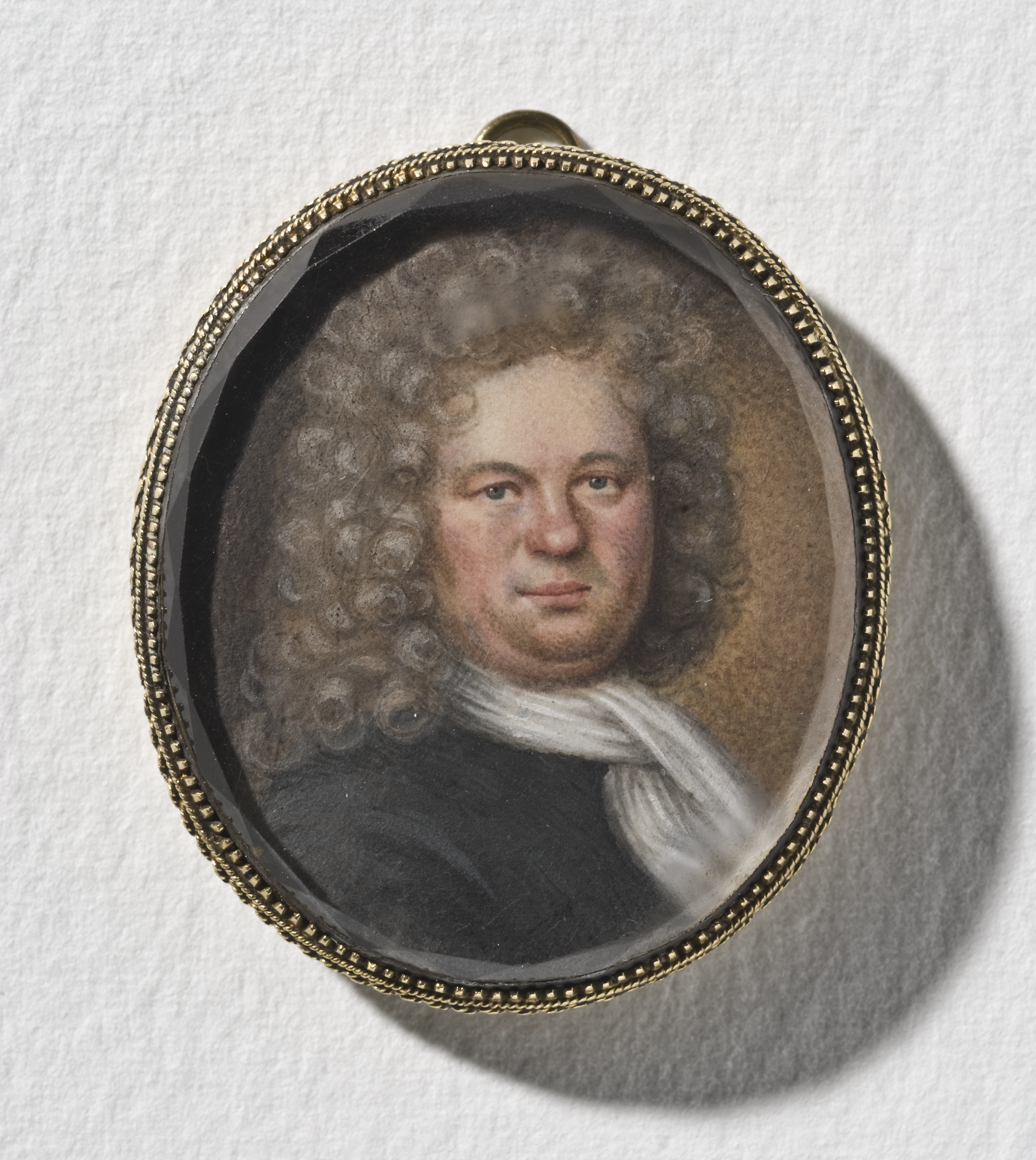
Hartwick Losck

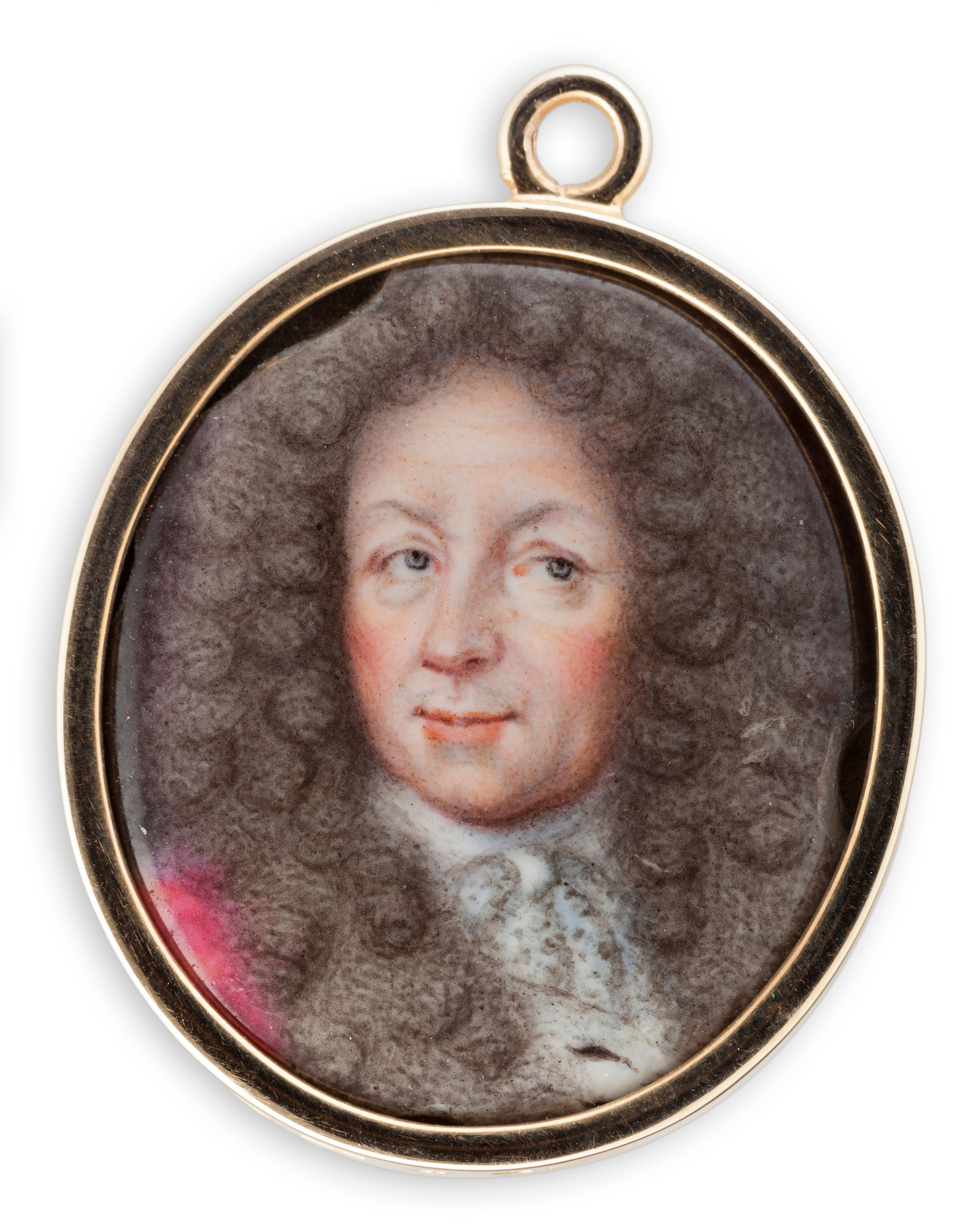
Bengt Oxenstierna
