= Skånelaholm Castle =

- Sigtuna Municipality, Sweden
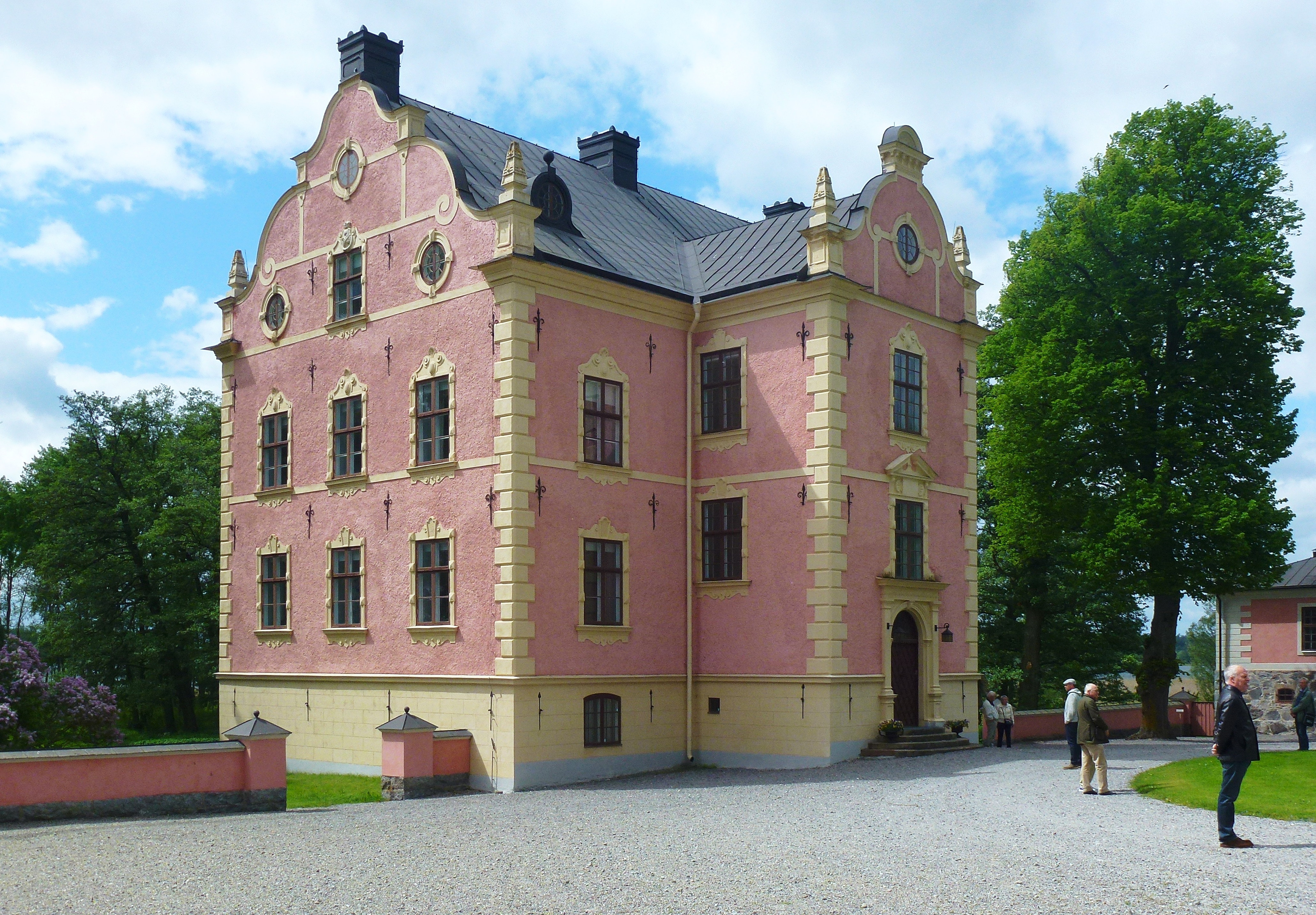

Site information
- Type: Castle
- Owner: Royal Swedish Academy of Letters, History and Antiquities
- Open to the public: Yes, guided tours

Location
- Coordinates: 59°34′42″N 17°56′09″E

Site history
- Built by: Andreas Gyldenklou

Skånelaholm Castle (Swedish: Skånelaholms slott) is a castle in Sigtuna Municipality, Stockholm County, Sweden.

== History ==
Skånelaholm lies in a very old cultural landscape and may have been a Crown Estate manor during the early Middle Ages. The estate is mentioned for the first time in written sources in 1276, when it was sold by King Magnus Ladulås to Sko Abbey, a monastery at the site of present-day Skokloster Castle. It remained in the possession of the abbey until the Reformation, when it was confiscated by King Gustav Vasa. It thereafter was a crown estate manor for a long time.

In 1618 it was let to Johan Patkull, a nobleman of Livonian extraction in service of the Swedish king (not to be confused with the more notorious Johann Patkul). The estate however remained the property of the crown until 1641 when it was bought by Andreas Gyldenklou, who built the presently visible main building. It stayed in the Gyldenklou family until the 1690s, after which the estate changed ownership several times until 1742, when it was acquired by Frans Jennings.

Jennings was born on Ireland but settled in Sweden and made a large fortune as a merchant in Stockholm. He was made a member of the Swedish nobility in 1742 and made Skånelaholm Castle the seat of his family. It stayed in the Jennings family until 1918. The last private owner of the estate was Herbert and Ing-Marie Rettig, who donated the castle to the Royal Swedish Academy of Letters, History and Antiquities in order to preserve it. Today, the academy owns and administers the estate.

== Architecture ==
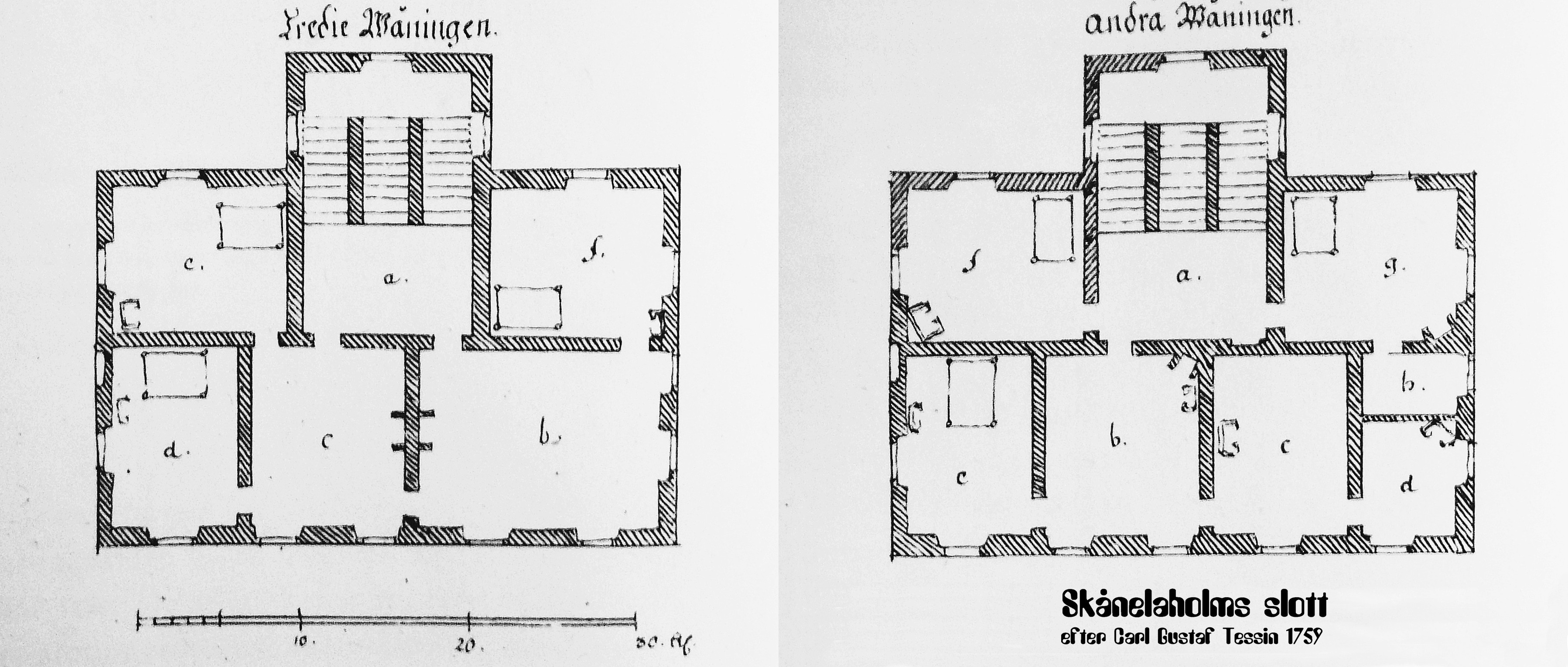
Skånelaholm Castle, drawing from 1759 drawn up by Carl Gustaf Tessin.

The castle was probably built in 1639–1643 and is in a German-Dutch late Renaissance style. It is built of brick, but during a renovation in the 1890s the facade was covered in stucco and the building attained its present ornate decoration, as well as its present colour. It lies on a peninsula in a small lake, Lake Fysingen, and is surrounded by a park. The park was probably laid out in the 18th century and transformed into an English landscape garden during the 19th century. The main building is flanked by four low wings, built during the middle of the 18th century.

The castle contains many preserved historical interiors. The first floor was the main representative floor and contains the dining room, a room of 17th-century character, and a Rococo drawing-room with paintings in the style of François Boucher, possibly painted by Guillaume Taraval. The second floor contains the large library and another drawing-room, called the "blue drawing-room". It contains Empire style furniture, possibly made in Venice.

== Overview ==
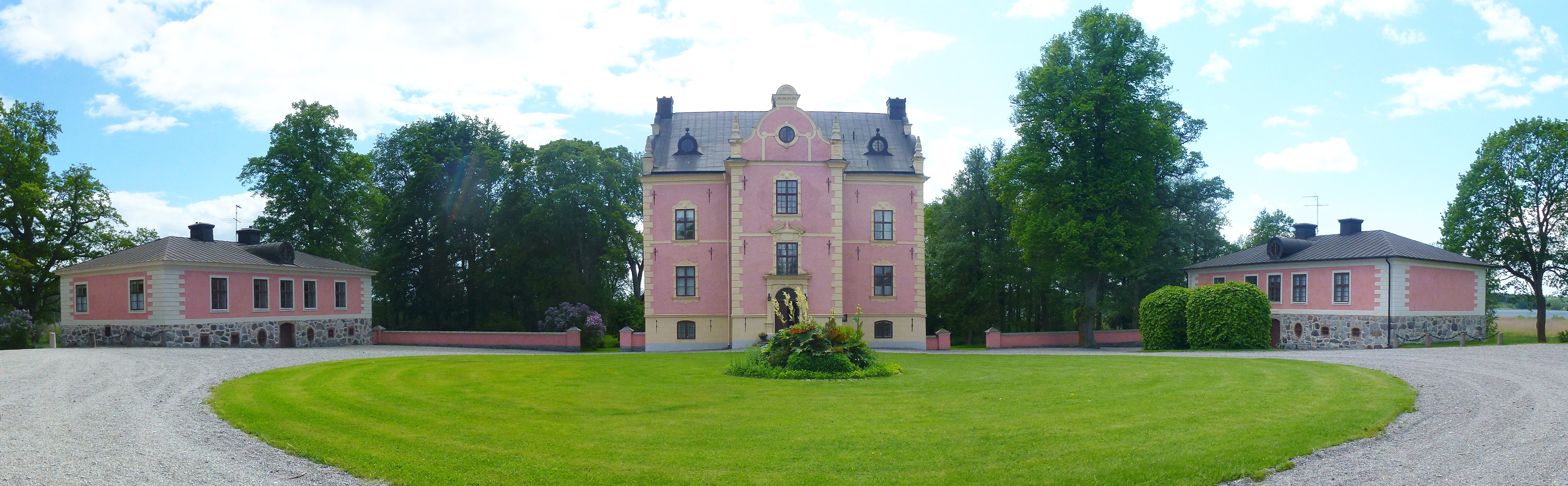
Skånelaholm Castle with two of the wings, view from north east

== See also ==
- List of castles and palaces in Sweden
