= Treaty of Amity and Commerce (United States–Sweden) =

1783 treaty between Sweden and the United States

Treaty of Amity and Commerce Between the United States and Sweden
- Type: Bilateral treaty
- Context: Commercial relations
- Signed: 3 April 1783
- Location: Paris, France
- Effective: 1783
- Condition: Active
- Negotiators: Benjamin Franklin; Gustaf Philip Creutz
- Original signatories: United States; Sweden
- Signatories: Benjamin Franklin (USA); Gustaf Philip Creutz (Sweden)
- Languages: American English; Swedish; French

The Treaty of Amity and Commerce Between the United States and Sweden (Swedish: Svensk-amerikanska vänskaps- och handelstraktaten), officially A treaty of Amity and Commerce concluded between His Majesty the King of Sweden and the United States of North America, was a treaty signed on April 3, 1783, in Paris, France between the United States and the Kingdom of Sweden. The treaty officially established commercial relations between these two nations and was signed during the American Revolutionary War.

== Background ==
In 1783 Benjamin Franklin was the American resident in Paris, and on September 28, 1782, he was given a new assignment by Congress, and was made Minister Plenipotentiary to His Majesty King Gustav III of Sweden. However, because Franklin was based in Paris, France, the discussions were carried out via the Swedish ambassador to the court of France, Count Gustaf Philip Creutz.

On April 3, 1783, the two of them signed the treaty. Later that same year, the Treaty of Paris was signed in Paris by representatives of King George III of Great Britain and representatives of the United States of America on September 3, 1783, which ended the American Revolutionary War.

== Signers ==
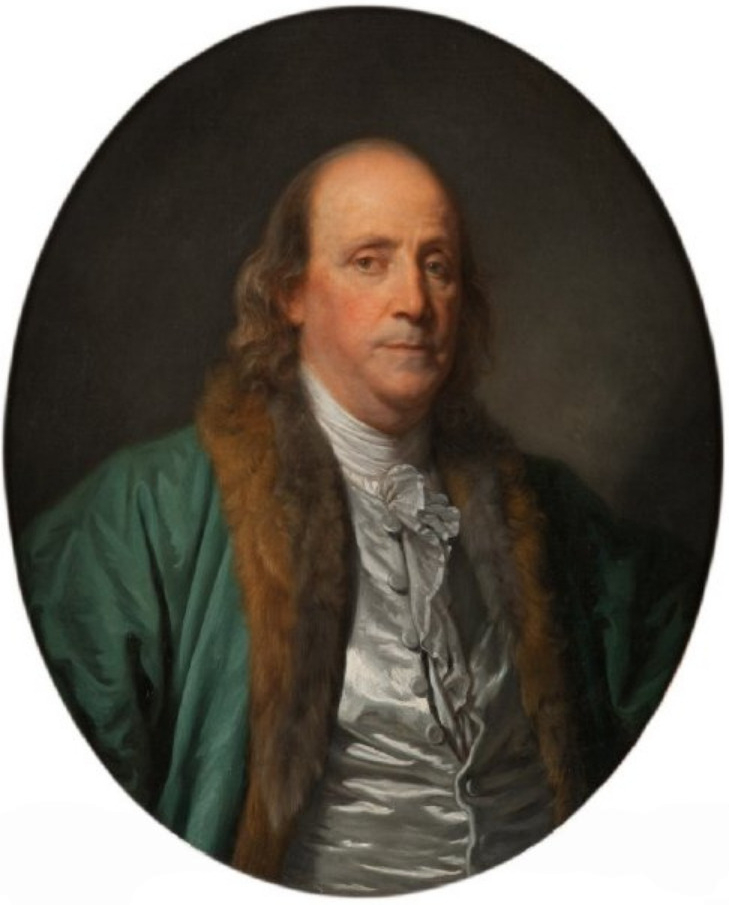
1777 Jean-Baptiste Greuze portrait of Ben Franklin

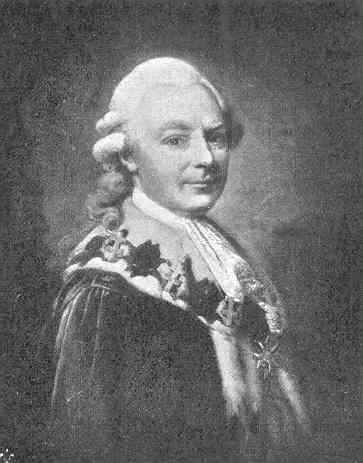
Gustaf Philip Creutz, dressed in the robes of a Swedish Privy Councilor, with the collar of the Royal Order of the Seraphim around his neck.

=== United States ===
- Benjamin Franklin

=== Sweden ===
- Count Gustaf Philip Creutz

== Provisions ==
- Peace and friendship between the U.S. and Sweden
- Mutual Most Favored Nation status with regard to commerce and navigation
- Mutual protection of all vessels and cargo when in U.S. or Swedish jurisdiction
- Mutual right for citizens of one country to hold land in other's territory
- Mutual right to search a ship of the other's coming out of an enemy port for contraband
- Right to due process of law if contraband is found on an allied ship and only after being Officially declared contraband may it be seized
- Mutual protection of men of war and privateers and their crews from harm from the other party and reparations to be paid if this provision is broken
- Restoration of stolen property taken by pirates
- Right of Ships of War and privateers to freely carry ships and goods taken for their enemy
- Mutual assistance, relief, and safe harbor to ships, both of War and Merchant, in crisis in the other's territory
- Neither side may commission privateers against the other nor allow foreign privateers that are enemies of either side to use their ports
- Mutual right to trade with enemy states of the other as long as those goods are not contraband
- If the two nations become enemies nine months protection of merchant ships in enemy territory
- To prevent quarrels between allies all ships must carry passports and cargo manifests
- If two ships meet Ships of War and Privateers must stay out of cannon range but may board the merchant ship to inspect her passports and manifests
- Mutual Right to inspection of a ship's cargo to only happen once
- Mutual right to have Counsuls, Vice Counsuls, Agents, and Commissaries of one nation in the other's ports

== Ratification ==
- The Treaty was ratified by Gustav III in Stockholm on May 23, 1783.
- The Treaty was ratified by Congress on July 29, 1783.
- The ratifications were exchanged at Paris on February 6, 1784.

== See also ==
- List of treaties

== Sources ==
- Giunta, Mary A., ed. Documents of the Emerging Nation: U.S. Foreign Relations 1775–1789. Wilmington, Del.: Scholarly Resources Inc., 1998.
- Middlekauff, Robert. The Glorious Cause: The American Revolution, 1763–1789 New York: Oxford University Press, 1982.
- "Treaty of Amity and Commerce," The Avalon Project at Yale Law School. ]. Accessed 30 March 2008.
