= Jennings (Swedish noble family) =

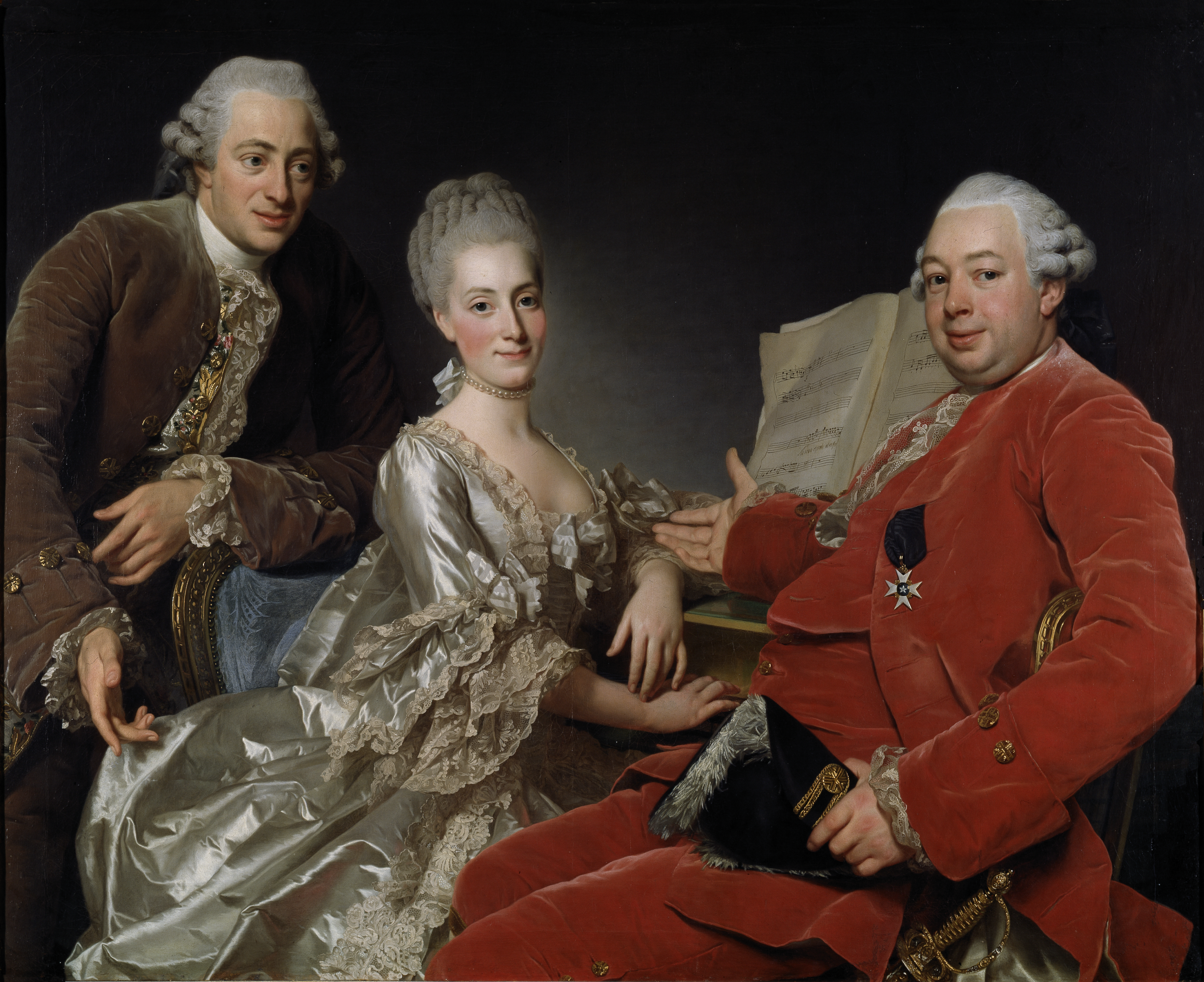
John Jennings, His Brother and Sister-in-Law, painting by Alexander Roslin (1769)

Jennings is a Swedish noble family. It was naturalised 1742, matriculated into Swedish House of Nobility 1743 under number 1874. The Jennings family descended from an old noble family named "Jenins" in England, from where it came to Ireland. The earliest known ancestor of the line is Francis Jennings of County Donegal in Ireland, who was born 1584. During the reign of Elizabeth I he moved from Somersetshire to Ireland, and died 1679. He was married with Elizabeth Montgomery, daughter of John Montgomery of Castel-Rabon in Ireland.

Skånelaholm Castle in Sweden was owned by Jennings family.

The family became extinct 1929.

== Sources ==
- Undersökning om herr Frantz Jennings och herr Robert Finlay, efter föregifvande värkeligen härstamma, den förre ifrån en adelig engelsk, och den senare ifrån en skåtsk familia: i grund hvaraf de blifvit ej allenast naturaliserade svenske adelsmän, utan ock, såsom sådane, deltagare både i Sveriges lagstiftande magt och dess hemligaste rådplägningar. Stockholm 1771.
