= Embassy of the United States, Stockholm =

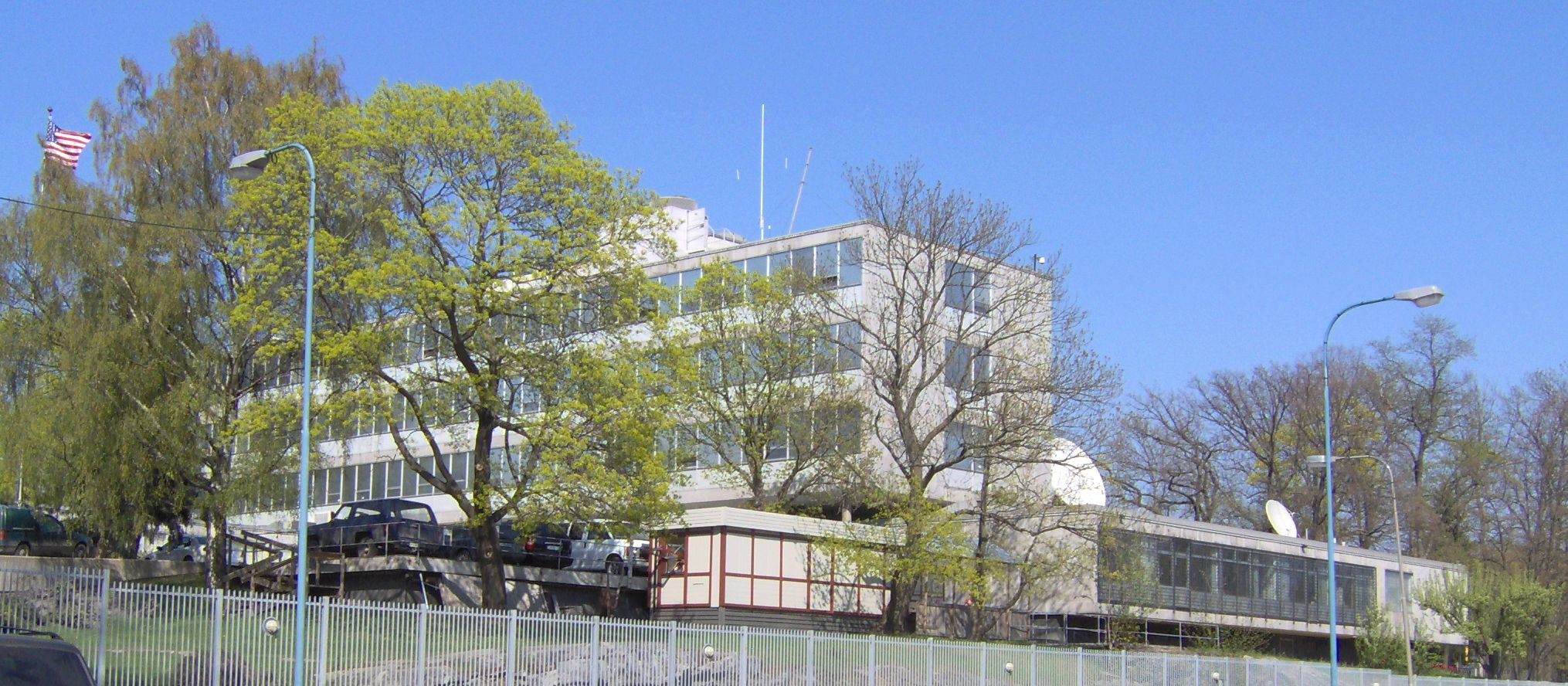
- Location: Diplomatstaden, Stockholm
- Address: Dag Hammarskjölds väg 31, with an entrance from Gärdesgatan 2
- Coordinates: 59°20′1″N 18°6′20″E
- Opened: 1782
- Website: Official website

The Embassy of the United States, Stockholm is the diplomatic mission of the United States in Diplomatstaden, Stockholm, Sweden. The diplomatic mission of the United States was established in April 1818 and elevated to an embassy in 1947.

== History ==
The history of the mission began in 1782 with Benjamin Franklin's appointment as the minister. Franklin served in the role from Paris, and never actually visited Sweden. The next minister, and the first to work from Stockholm, was Jonathan Russell in 1814. Russell was also Ambassador to Norway, which remained a joint position until the Union between Sweden and Norway dissolved in 1905.

The American ambassador's residence was established in 1935. The embassy building was inaugurated in 1955, designed by two American architects; Ralph Rapson and his colleague John Van der Muelen, with Swedish contact architect and collaborator Anders Tengbom. The same pair of architects also designed the Embassy of the United States, Copenhagen.

The embassy has been the subject of numerous demonstrations and barricades, including those related to the September 11 attacks and the Iraq War.

== Gallery ==
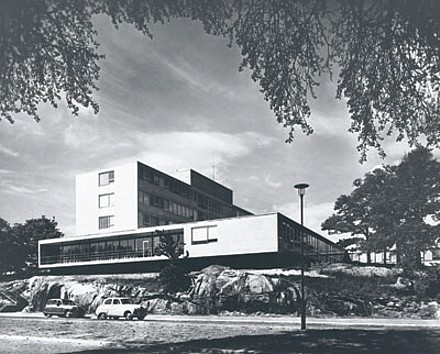
The embassy building in 1955.

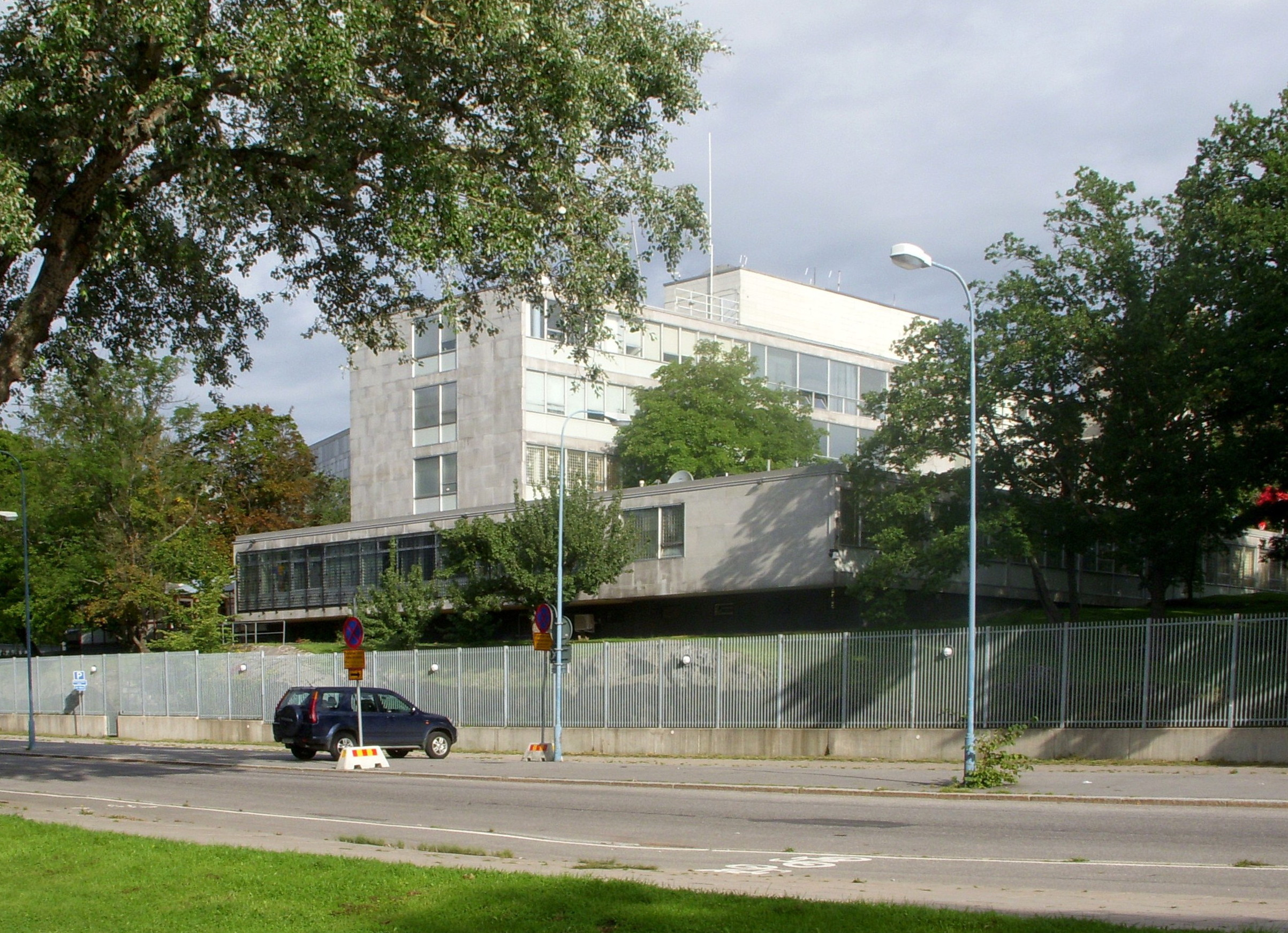
The embassy building in 2008.

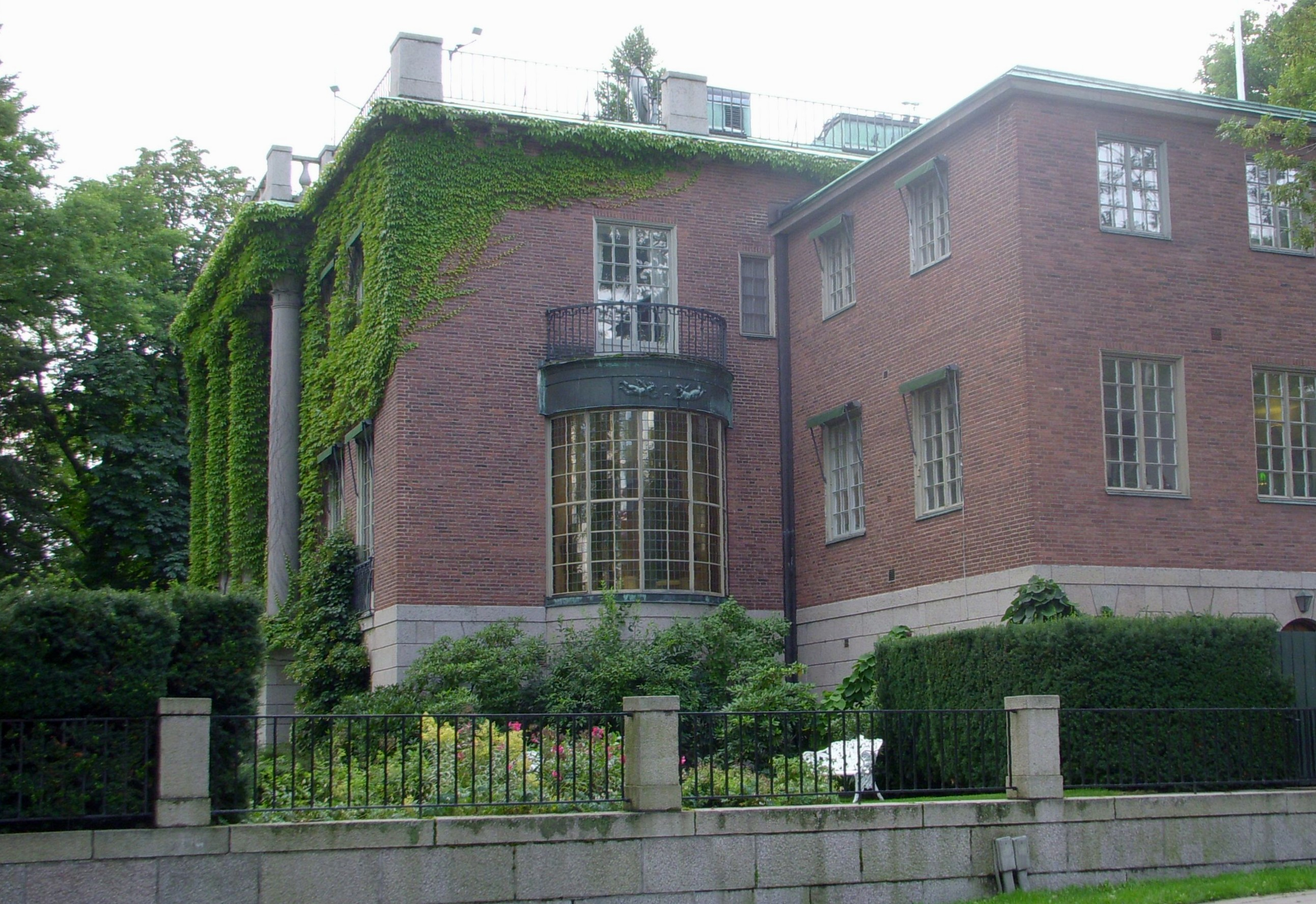
The residence Villa Åkerlund

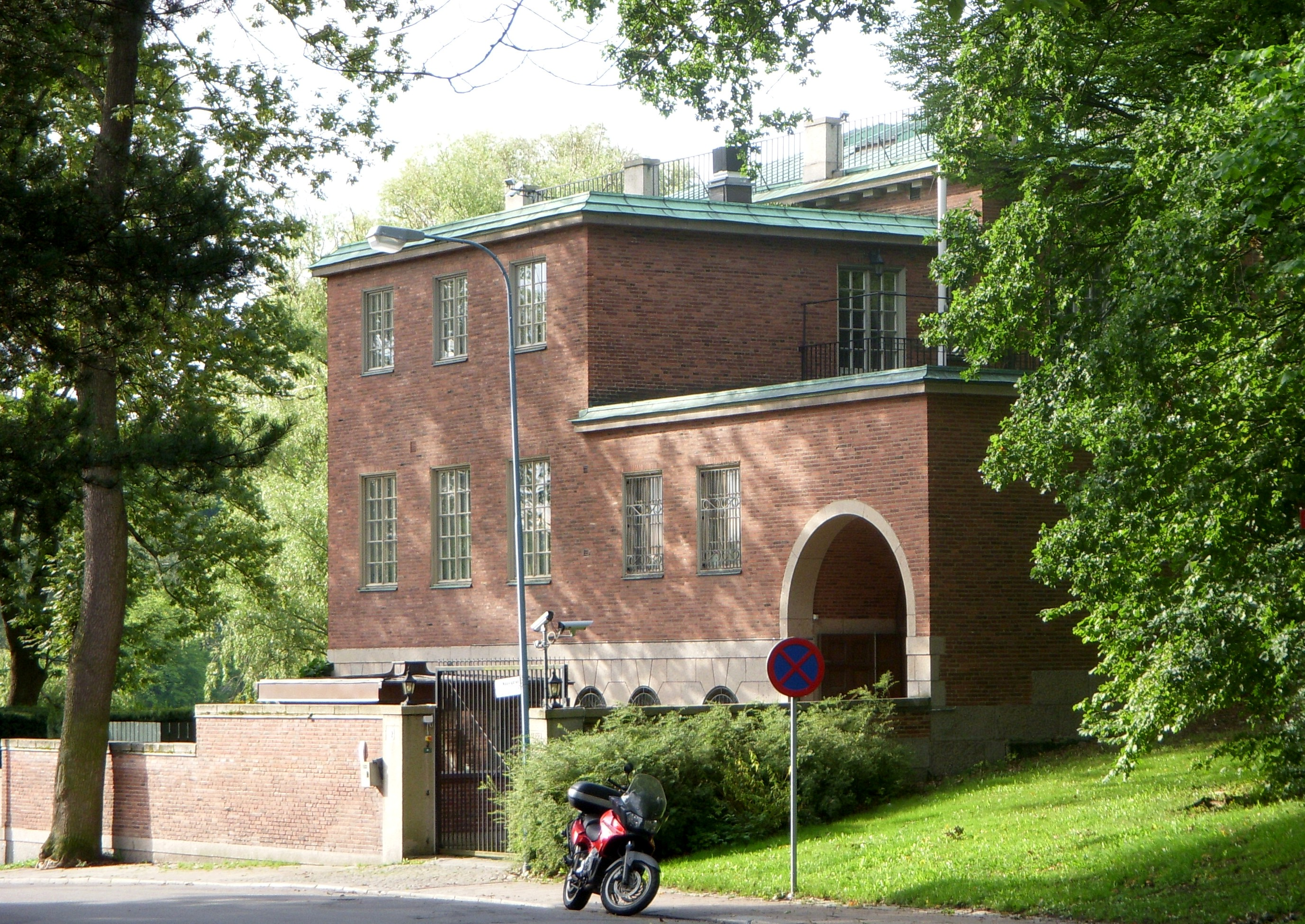
The American Ambassador's residence in Diplomatstaden

== See also ==
- List of ambassadors of the United States to Sweden
