= Gustaf Philip Creutz =

Swedish statesman and poet (1731–1785)

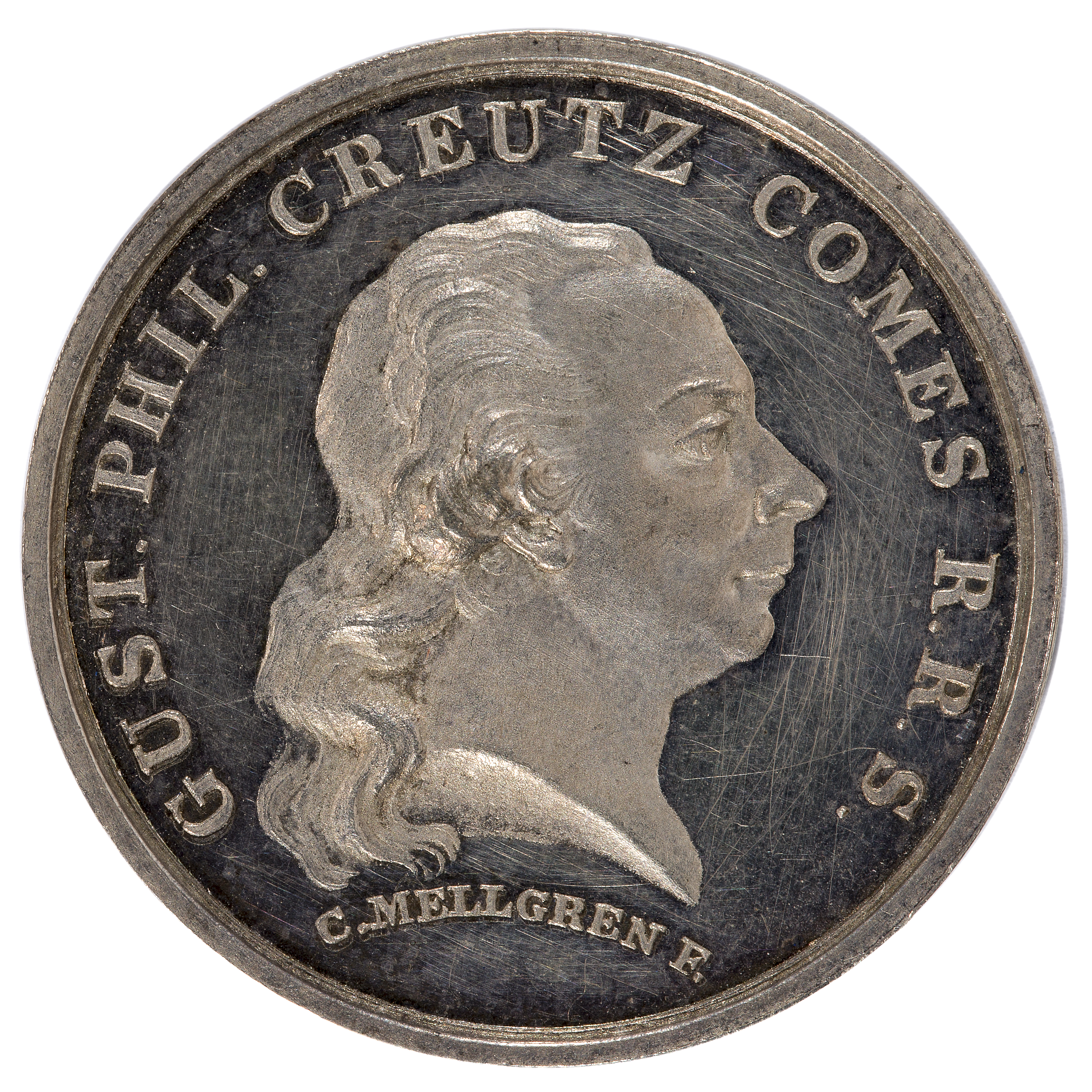
Gustav Filip Creutz.

Count Gustaf Philip Creutz (Swedish pronunciation: [ˈɡɵ̂sːtav ˈfǐːlɪp ˈkrœjts]; 1 May 1731 in Anjala, Finland – 30 October 1785 in Stockholm), was a Swedish statesman, diplomat and poet.

== Biography ==
Creutz was born in Finland and after concluding his studies at the Royal Academy of Turku he received a post in the Privy Council Chancery at Stockholm in 1751. Here he met Count Gustaf Fredrik Gyllenborg, with whom his name is indissolubly connected. They were closely allied with Hedvig Charlotta Nordenflycht, and their works were published in common; to their own generation they seemed equal in fame, but posterity has given the palm of genius to Creutz.

His greatest work is contained in the 1762 volume, the idyll of Atis och Camilla; the exquisite little pastoral entitled Daphne was published at the same time, and Gyllenborg was the first to proclaim the supremacy of his friend.

In 1763, Creutz practically closed his poetical career; he went to Spain as ambassador, and after three years to Paris in the same capacity until May 1783, and it was during this time that Creutz met with the American resident in Paris at the time, Benjamin Franklin. Creutz and Franklin drafted the first Treaty of Amity and Commerce between the two nations.

In 1783, King Gustav III of Sweden recalled him and heaped honours upon him, but he died soon after. In 1784, he was elected a member of the Royal Swedish Academy of Sciences.

Atis och Camilla was long the most admired poem in the Swedish language; it is written in a spirit of pastoral which is now to some degree faded, but in comparison with most of the other productions of the time it is freshness itself. Creutz introduced a melody and grace into the Swedish tongue which it lacked before, and he has been styled the last artificer of the language.

== See also ==
- List of people on stamps of the United States
