= Royal Swedish Academy of Letters, History and Antiquities =

Swedish royal academy for the Humanities

Coordinates: 59°20′30″N 18°4′21″E

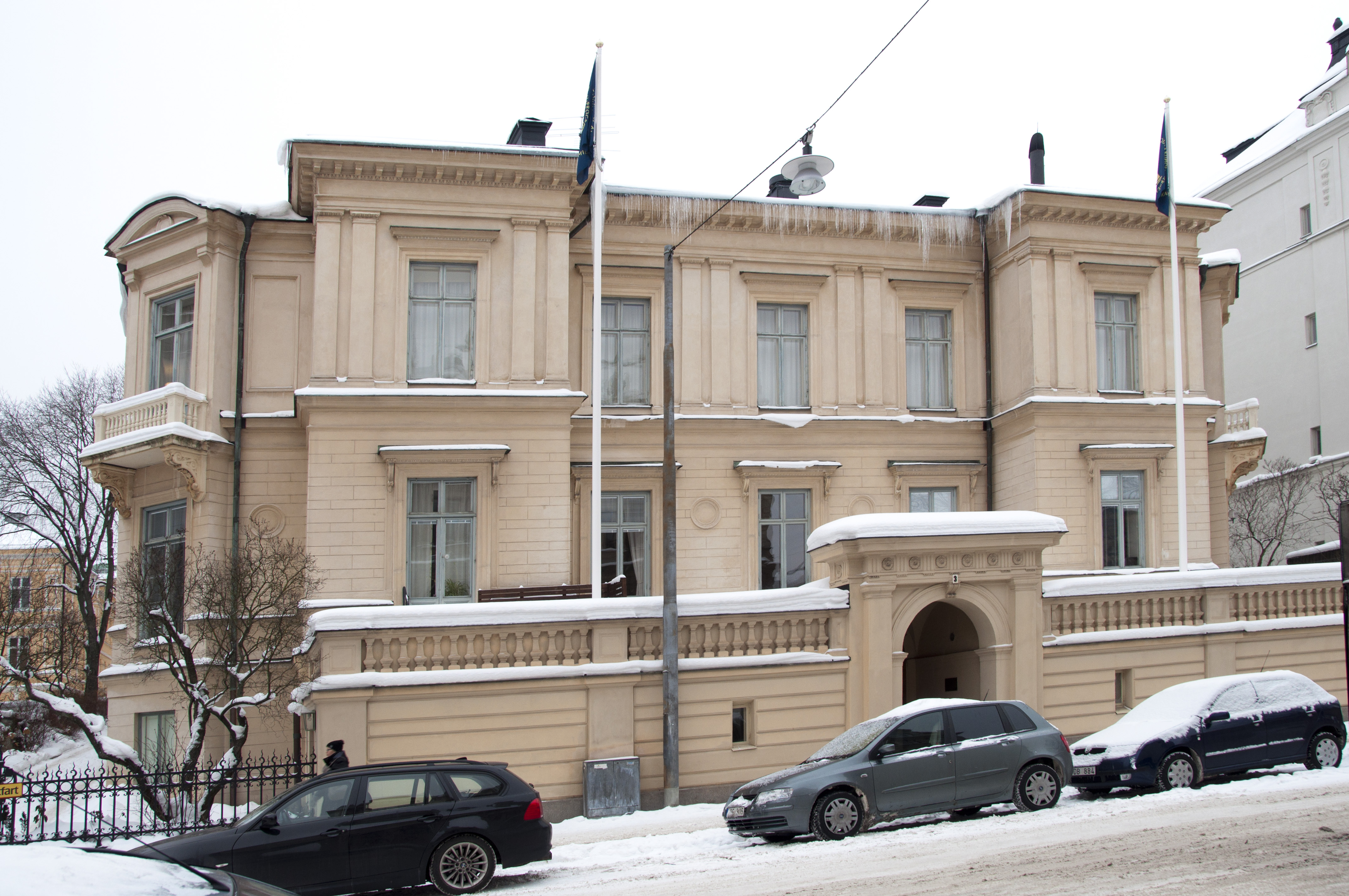
Vitterhetsakademien, Villagatan 3 in Stockholm.

The Royal Swedish Academy of Letters, History and Antiquities also called simply the Royal Academy of Letters or Vitterhetsakademien abbreviated KVHAA (Swedish: Kungl. Vitterhetsakademien Historie och Antikvitets Akademien or Kungliga Vitterhets Historie och Antikvitets Akademien or Vitterhetsakademien) is the Swedish royal academy for the Humanities. Its many publications include the archaeological and art historical journal Fornvännen, published since 1906.

== History ==
Now located in Rettigska house at Villagatan 3 in Stockholm, the Academy had origins in the early 1700s Uppsala. It was founded in 1753 by Queen Louisa Ulrica, Queen of Sweden and the mother of King Gustav III and originally dedicated to literature. In 1786 when the Swedish Academy was founded it was reconstituted under its present name with new objectives, mainly dedicated to historical and antiquarian preservation. This included a close cooperation with the Swedish National Heritage Board (Swedish: "Riksantikvarieämbetet") whose director was, ex officio, the Academy's secretary.

== Objectives ==
The Academy's purpose is "to promote research and other activities in the humanities, religious studies, jurisprudence and social science disciplines and cultural heritage". This is done primarily through financial support and through vibrant publishing. Among the academy's writings are Fornvännen. The Academy's responsibilities have grown to encompass the entire activity of the humanities field in the broad sense, including religion, law and social studies. At the request of the government or public authority, or on its own initiative, the Academy gives opinions on matters that affect its activity.

== Cultural Heritage properties ==
The Academy owns and operates the Stjernsund Castle in Närke, Skånelaholm Castle in Uppland, Stensjö hamlet in Småland and Borg hamlet on the island of Öland. Vitterhetsakademi's library is included in the Swedish National Heritage Board and operates public scientific special interest libraries. It is open to the public.

== Organization ==
Academy is composed of up to 30 executive members in each historical, antiquarian, philosophical, philological class and up to ten honorary members. Swedish and foreign "corresponding members" are not limited in number. When a working member reaches 70 years they can choose a new member, while 70-year-olds remain in the Academy as emeritus or emerita. Therefore, the Academy currently has around 130 members.

== Prizes ==
Diploma, prizes, medals and awards distributed by the Academy at a formal gathering which takes place annually on 20 March. Academy awards several prizes such as the Gad Rausing's prize for outstanding humanistic research, Ann-Kersti and Carl-Hakon Swenson's Swenson prize and Rettigska price. The Academy also awards several medals such as the Gustaf Adolf Medal by the King's consent, the Academy's Medal of Merit in gold, Academy token in gold, Antiquarian medal and silver medal inscriptions in silver.
