= Gustaf Fredrik Gyllenborg =

Swedish writer

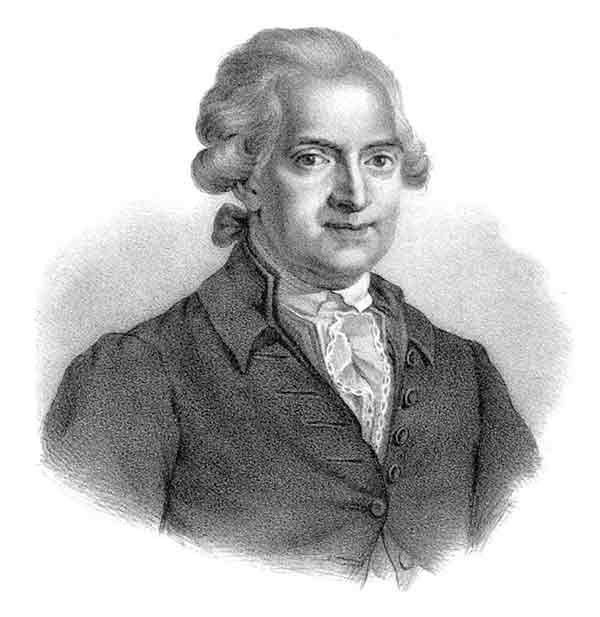
Lithography of Gyllenborg

Count Gustaf Fredrik Gyllenborg (25 November 1731 – 30 March 1808) was a Swedish writer.

Gustaf Fredrik Gyllenborg was born at Strömsbro, Svinstad, Östergötland and died in Stockholm. He was one of the leading lights of Tankebyggarorden (Order of the Thought-builders), one of the earliest literary societies, which was founded by Carl Fredrik Eckleff.

Gustaf Fredrik Gyllenborg was a son of the Reichsrat Johan Gyllenborg. From 1746 to 1747 he studied in Uppsala and then from 1748 to 1751 in Lund, on which latter university he was the last Rector Illustris. In 1751, he was consulted as the registrar for the judicial revisions. From 1756 to 1762 he stayed as a cavalier of the heir to the throne Gustav at the Swedish royal court. In 1762, he was appointed Chamber Council and in 1774 as a law firm. In order to introduce him to the state civil servant career, he was elected bank representative, and was a member of the number lottery. He was not active politically.

Gyllenborg was also one of the original members of the Swedish Academy, where he held Seat 13 from the founding of the Academy until his death in 1808.

Cultural offices
Preceded by First holder	Swedish Academy; Seat No.13; 1786–1808	Succeeded by Frans Michael Franzén
