= National Portrait Gallery (Sweden) =

Art museum in Mariefred, Sweden

- Statens porträttsamlings
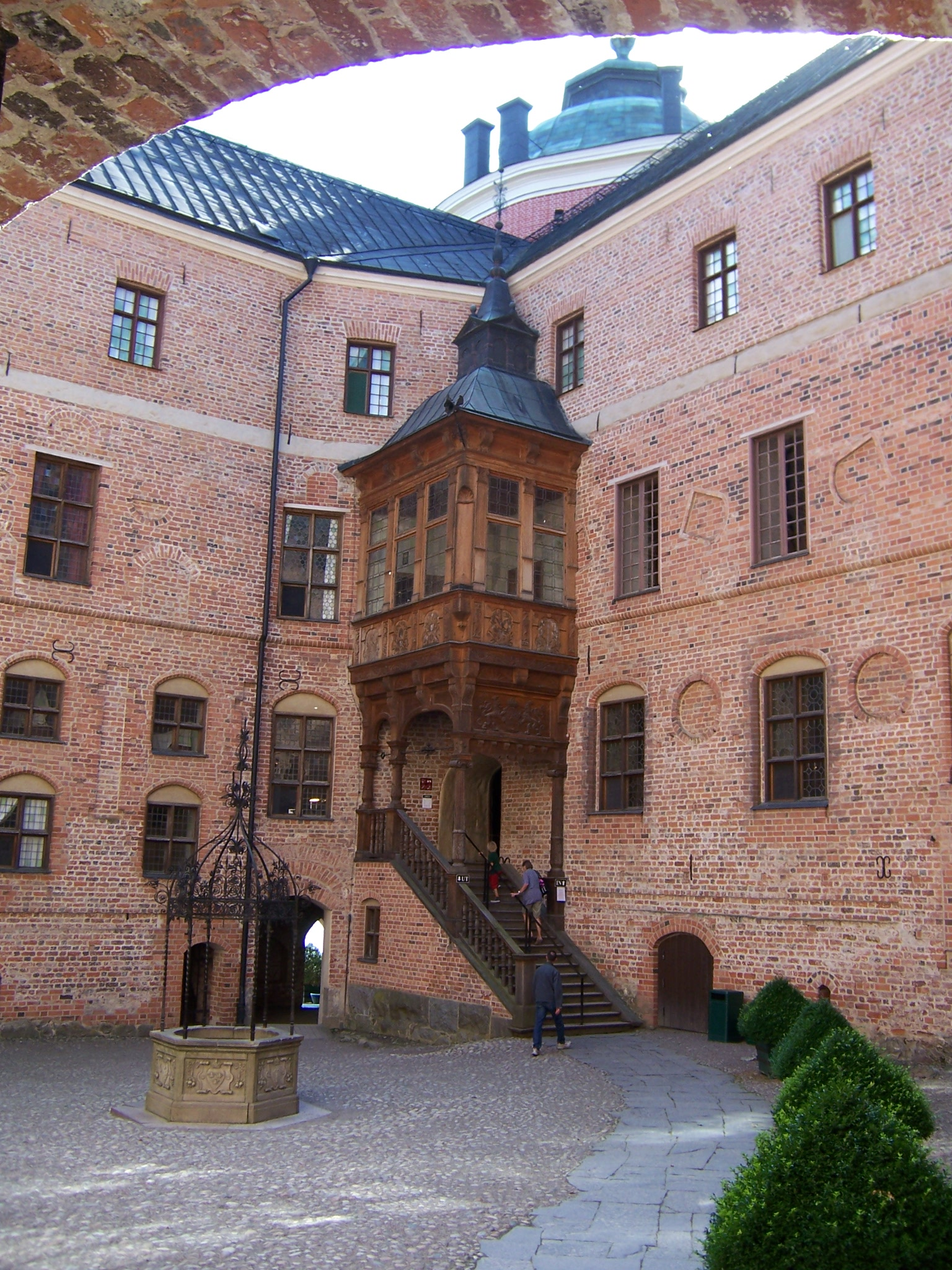
- National Portrait Gallery at Gripsholm Castle
- Established: 1822
- Location: Gripsholm Castle, Mariefred, Södermanland County, Sweden
- Coordinates: 59°15′22″N 17°13′09″E
- Type: Art gallery
- Website: kungligaslotten.se/the-swedish-national-portrait-gallery

The National Portrait Gallery (Swedish: Statens porträttsamling) is a museum and portrait gallery located at Gripsholm Castle at Mariefred in Södermanland County, Sweden. It contains a collection of portraits of prominent Swedes.

== History ==
The collection originated during the reign of King Gustav Vasa, who had portraits displayed in the newly built Gripsholm Castle. During the reign of King Gustav III, it developed into a national portrait collection and began to include portraits of non-royal figures.

The National Portrait Gallery was officially founded in 1822 with over 4000 works that trace the portrait art changes from the 1500s to the present. Nationalmuseum has been responsible for the portrait collection since 1860. This arrangement has been periodically extended.

Each year the Gripsholm Society commissions and donates a portrait of an internationally prominent Swedish citizens to the collection. Many portraits are the work of prominent Swedish artists.

== Notable portraits ==
- Greta Garbo by Einar Nerman (1908)
- Dag Hammarskjöld by Fritiof Schüldt (1959)
- Birgit Nilsson by Lasse Johnson (1963)
- Gunnar Myrdal by Sven Ljungberg (1968)
- Ingmar Bergman by Birgit Broms (1989)
