= List of Swedish royal residences =

The following list of Swedish royal residences includes official and private residences of the Monarchy of Sweden. The current royal palaces are owned by the Swedish state (svenska staten), administered by the Office of the Governor of the Royal Palaces (Ståthållarämbetet), and managed by the Swedish National Property Board (Statens fastighetsverk). In addition, there are also residences which are privately owned by members of the Swedish royal family. Some residences serve primarily ceremonial functions and are rarely used residentially.

== List of residences ==
=== Palaces with right of disposal ===
Image	Name	Location	Architects	Style	Notes
	Stockholm Palace	Stadsholmen, Stockholm	Nicodemus Tessin the Younger; Carl Hårleman	Baroque	Official residence of the King and Queen.
	Drottningholm Palace	Lovön, Uppland	Nicodemus Tessin the Elder; Nicodemus Tessin the Younger; Carl Hårleman	Baroque	
	Gripsholm Castle	Mariefred, Södermanland	Henrik von Cöllen; Fredric Nussdorffer	Renaissance	
	Chinese Pavilion	Lovön, Uppland	Carl Fredric Adelcrantz	Chinoiserie	
	Ulriksdal Palace	Ulriksdal, Uppland	Hans Jacob Kristler; Nicodemus Tessin the Elder; Carl Hårleman	Renaissance	
	Rosersberg Palace	Rosersberg, Uppland	Gabriel Bengtsson Oxenstierna; Nicodemus Tessin the Younger	Neoclassical	
	Strömsholm Palace	Strömsholm, Västmanland	Nicodemus Tessin the Elder	Baroque	
	Tullgarn Palace	Tullgarn, Södermanland	Joseph Gabriel Destain	Gustavian	
	Gustav III's Pavilion	Haga Park, Stockholm	Olof Tempelman	Gustavian	
	Haga Palace	Haga Park, Stockholm	Carl Christoffer Gjörwell the Younger	Gustavian	Official residence of the Crown Princess Couple.
	Rosendal Palace	Djurgården, Stockholm	Fredrik Blom	Empire	

=== Other residences and places ===
- Riddarholmen Church
- Royal Djurgården
- Swedish Royal Stables
- Solliden Palace
- Stenhammar Palace
- Beylon Villa
- Parkudden Villa
- Solbacken Villa

=== Former royal residences ===
- Hereditary Prince's Palace
- Byström Villa
- Sofiero Palace
- Oakhill Palace

== See also ==
- List of royal residences
- List of palaces in Sweden
