= Gripsholm Castle =

Coordinates: 59°15′22″N 17°13′09″E

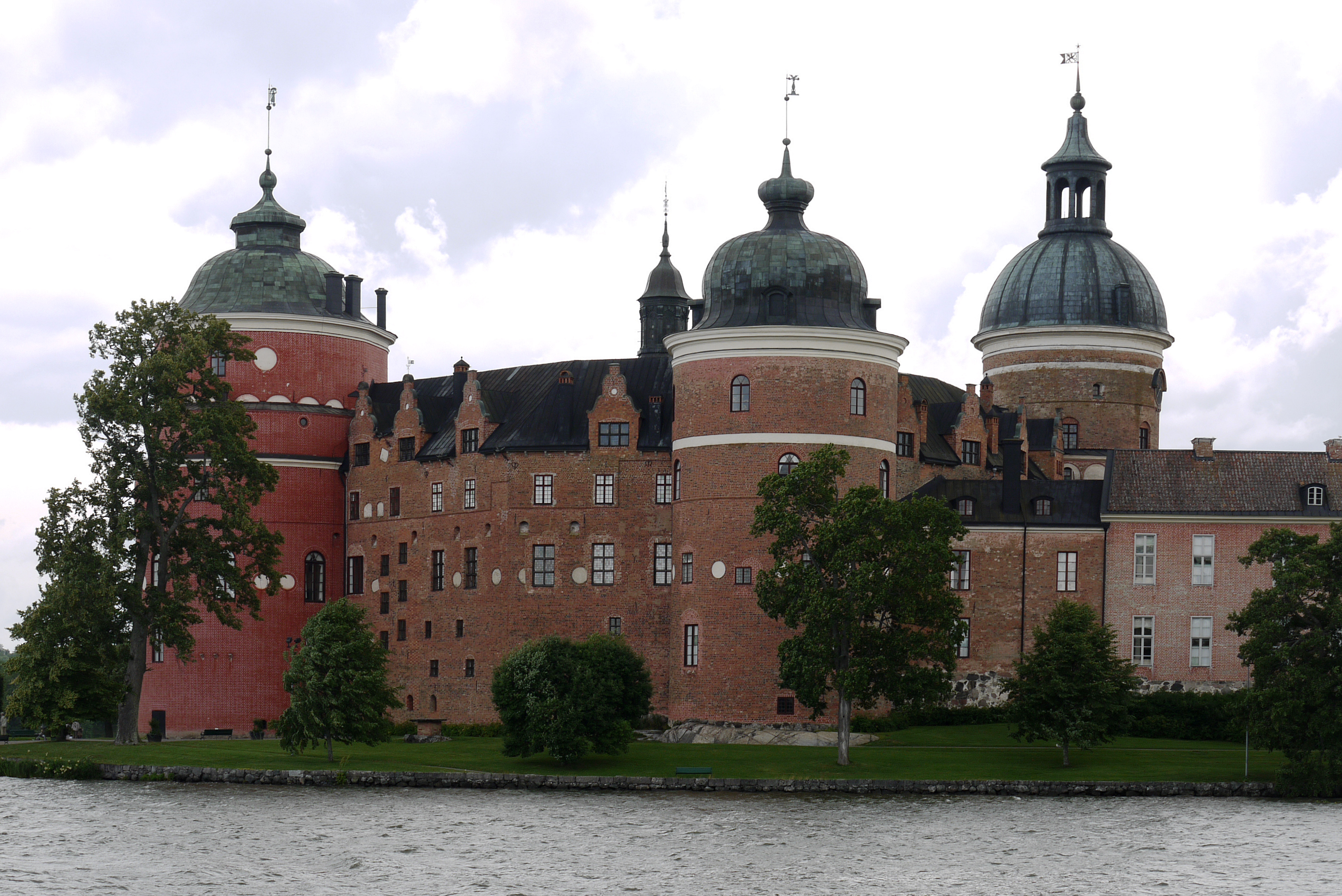
- Water view of the castle
- Interactive map of the Gripsholm Castle area

General information
- Architectural style: Renaissance
- Location: Mariefred, Sweden
- Construction started: 1537
- Completed: 1709; 317 years ago

Design and construction
- Architect: Henrik von Cöllen

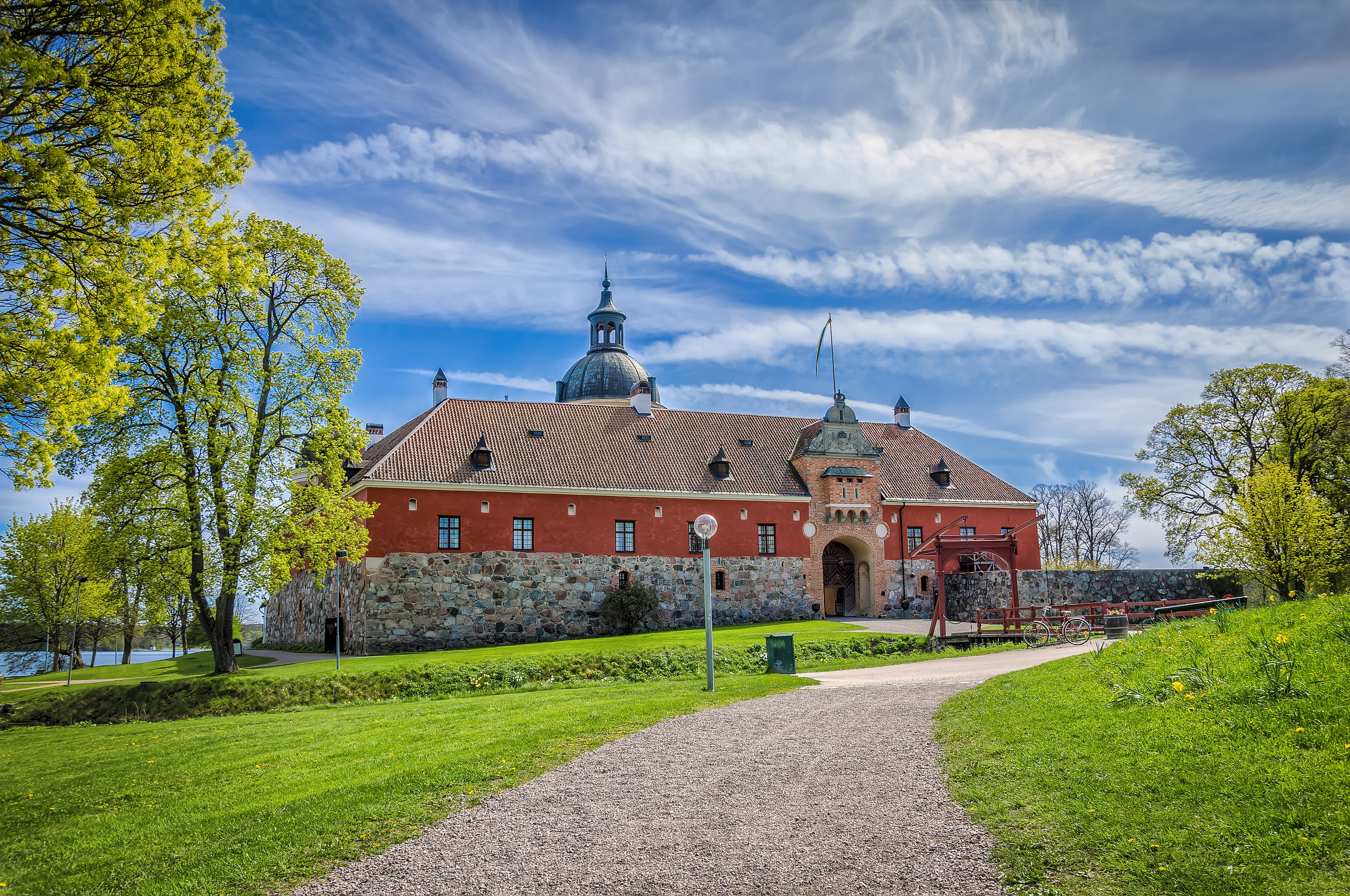
Walkway leading to Gripsholm Castle

Gripsholm Castle (Swedish: Gripsholms slott) is a castle in Mariefred, Södermanland, Sweden. It is located by Lake Mälaren in south central Sweden, in the municipality of Strängnäs, about 60 km west of Stockholm. Since Gustav I Vasa, Gripsholm has belonged to the Swedish royal family and was used as one of their residences until the 18th century. It is now a museum, but is still considered to be a palace at the disposal of the King and as such it is part of the Crown palaces in Sweden.

== History ==
=== Early history ===
A fortress was built at the location in the 1370s by Bo Jonsson Grip. It was sold to Queen Margaret I in 1404, and remained the property of the crown until it was acquired by Sten Sture the Elder, the Regent, in 1472 by an exchange of landed properties, whereby it became private, hereditary land of allodial status, to belong to the ownership of Regent Sten's own family. Sten donated the place for use as a Carthusian monastery, or charterhouse, in 1498, and the Gripsholm estate functioned as Mariefred Charterhouse for almost 30 years.

In 1526, the monastery was dissolved by King Gustav I during the Swedish Reformation, and the estate was returned to its hereditary owner, the heir of the late Sten Sture the Old. It is well-recorded that Gripsholm was a part of the so-called Kungens Arv och Eget in registers of the 1500s and the 1600s.

The King tore the monastic buildings and the old castle down, and built a fortified castle with circular corner towers and a wall, for defensive purposes. Of the original medieval fortress, only the façade of a wall remains.

As private family inheritance from the Regent Sten Sture the Old, the royal Vasa family held Gripsholm in high regard, as a reminder of the royals' descent from earlier rulers, and used the place frequently.

=== Royal residence ===
King Gustav had it constructed to serve as one of the main residences of the royal house. The castle was constructed between 1537 and 1545, and often served as the residence of the royal court: during the Dacke War, for example, the royal children were housed there.

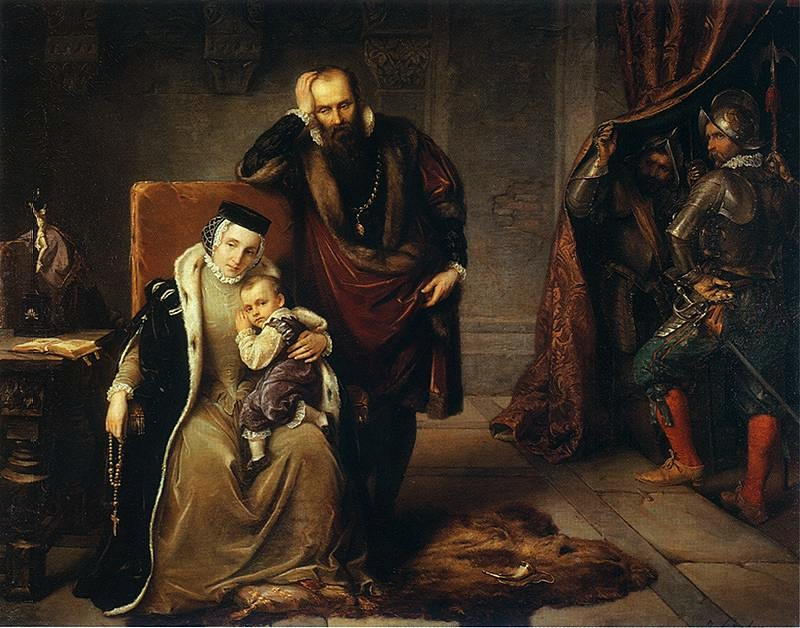
Catherine Jagiellon and her son Sigismund in Gripsholm prison (National Museum, Warsaw).

Between 1563 and 1567, King Eric XIV imprisoned his brother John and his consort Catherine Jagiellon in the castle. John's son Sigismund III Vasa, later the King of Poland and Sweden, was born in the castle on June 20, 1566. When Eric XIV was deposed by John, Gripsholm Castle came to serve as one of the castles where John had Eric imprisoned. The deposed King Eric was kept prisoner here from 1571 until 1573.

The royal family continued to use Gripsholm Castle during the 17th century. It was the dower residence of the widow of Gustavus Adolphus of Sweden, Maria Eleonora of Brandenburg, who lived here from 1636 until 1640. Between 1654 and 1715, Gripsholm Castle was a part of the dower granted to Queen Hedvig Eleonora, who often lived there with her court even before being widowed in 1660, and who rebuilt and expanded it in several ways. After her death, however, the castle was abandoned by the court for some time. For a period during the 18th century, it was used as a prison.

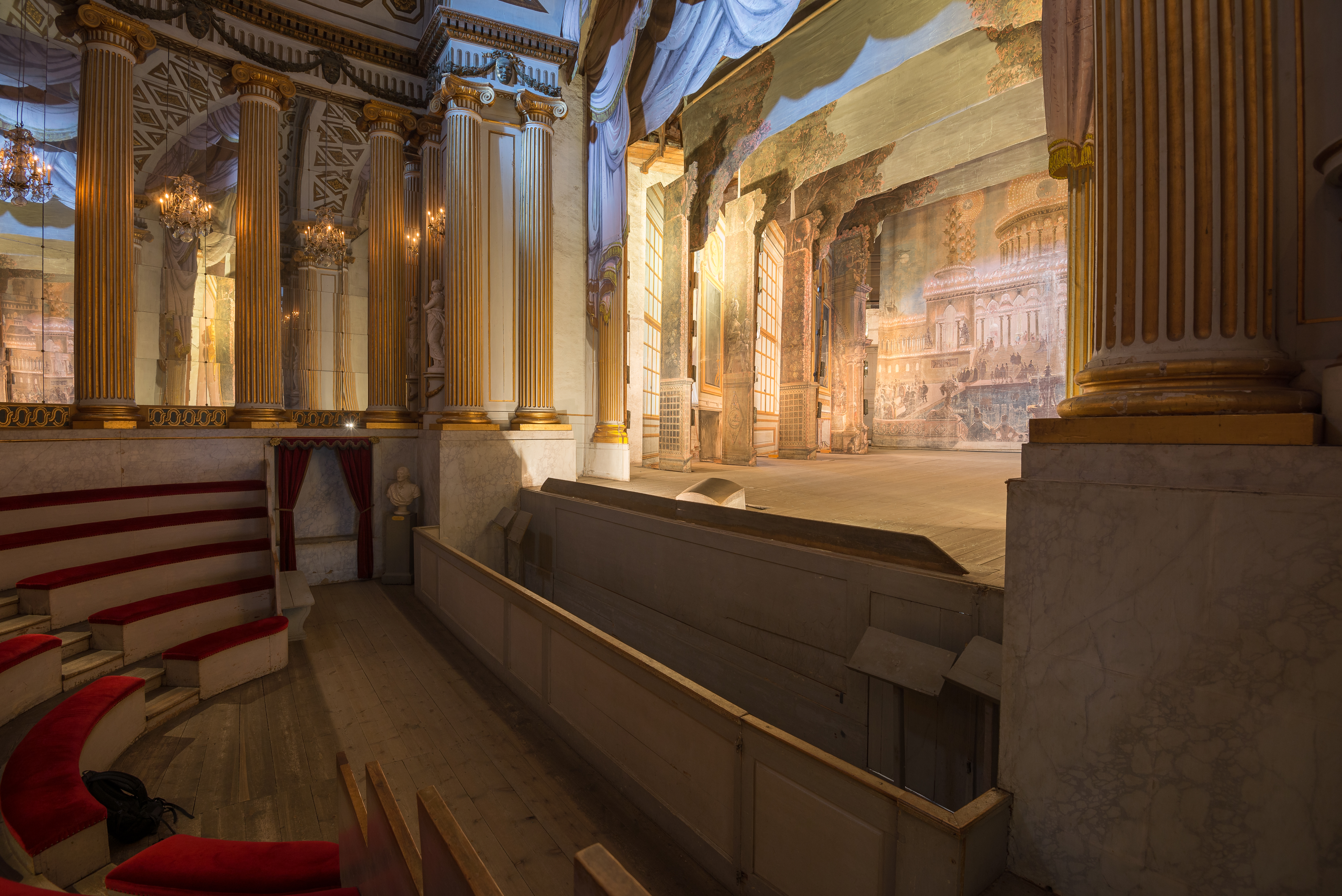
Gustav III's Theatre.

In 1773, Gripsholm Castle was renovated by King Gustav III, on behalf of his consort Sophia Magdalena. The castle was frequently used by the royal court during the reign of Gustav III, who favored it and spent several months there every year. During his reign, a theater was added to the castle in one of the towers. It was the stage for both the amateur theatre of the royal court as well as the French Theater of Gustav III in 1781–1792.

After the Coup of 1809, Gustav IV Adolf and his family were also imprisoned in the castle after his deposition from the throne. He had to sign his abdication document there.

=== Museum ===
In 1822, the building came to host the National Portrait Gallery (Statens porträttsamlingar), which was placed under the supervision of the Nationalmuseum in the 1860s.

Between 1889 and 1894, the castle underwent a heavy and controversial restoration by the architect Fredrik Lilljekvist during which many of the 17th and 18th-century alterations were removed. The largest change was the addition of a third floor; the planned demolition of a wing did not take place.

Now the castle is a museum which is open to the public, containing paintings and works of art. Part of the castle houses the National Portrait Gallery, one of the oldest portrait collections in the world. The museum includes a badly-stuffed lion which has become infamous in recent years.

== Image gallery ==
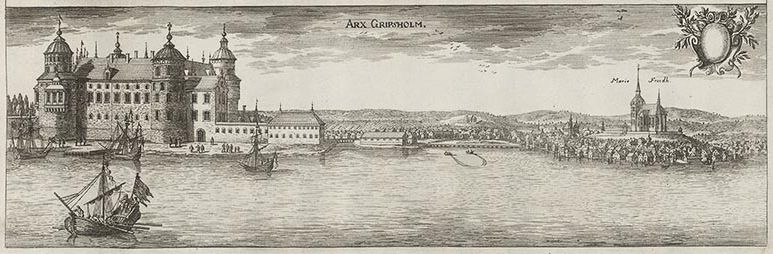
In the Suecia Antiqua et Hodierna, c. 1700

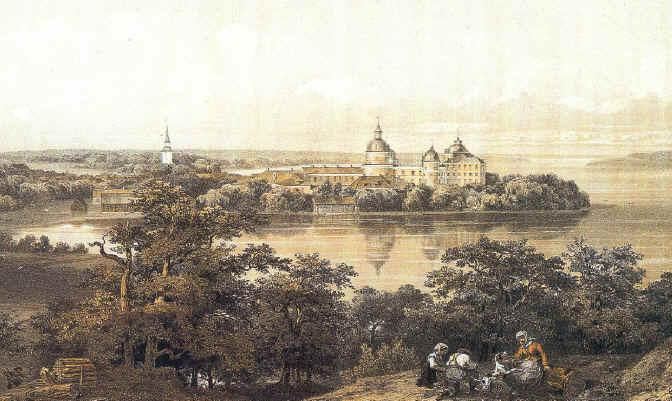
Gripsholm by Carl Johann Billmark, 1850

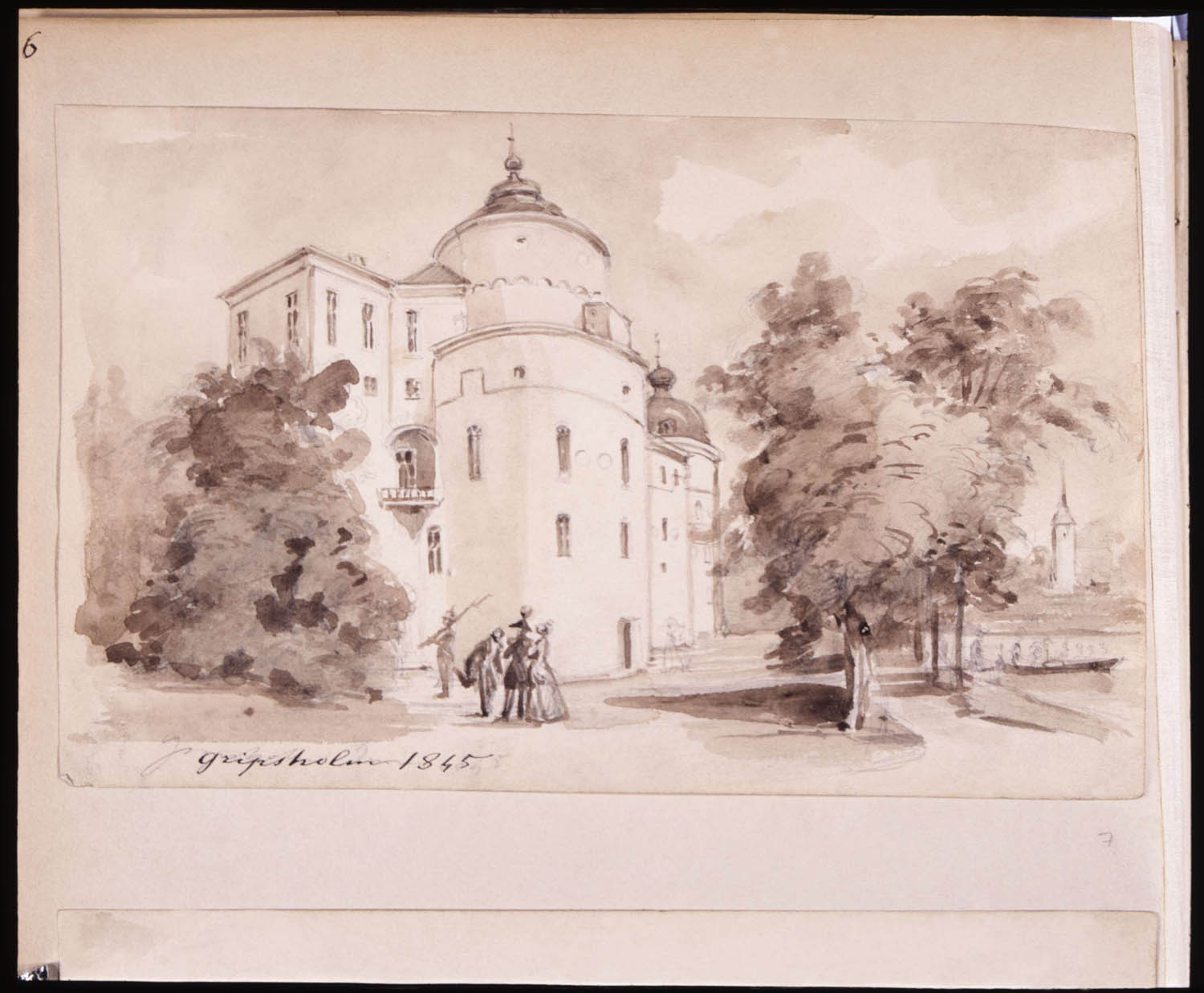
Drawing of Gripsholm Castle by Fritz von Dardel, 1845

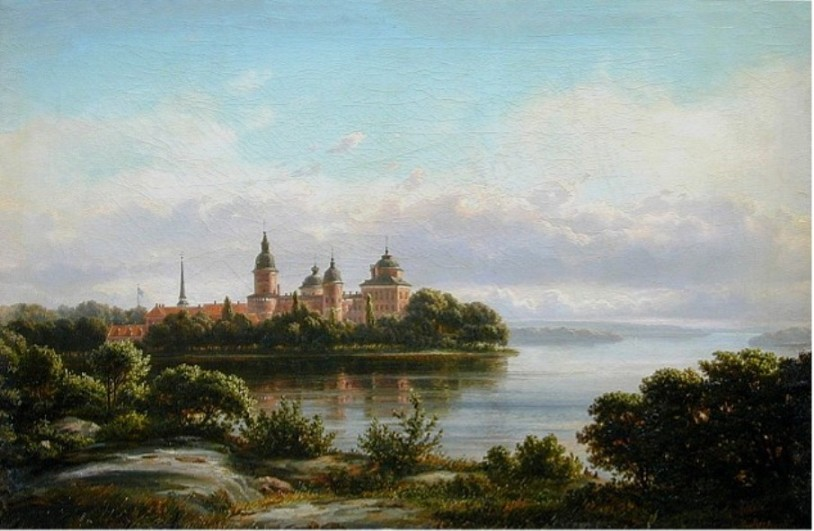
painting by Ferdinand Richardt, 1869

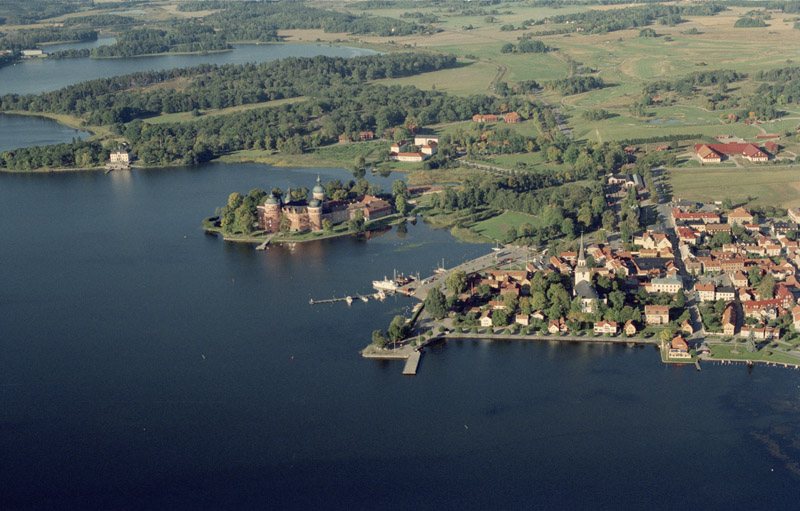
Aerial photograph by Jan Norman, 26 September 1997

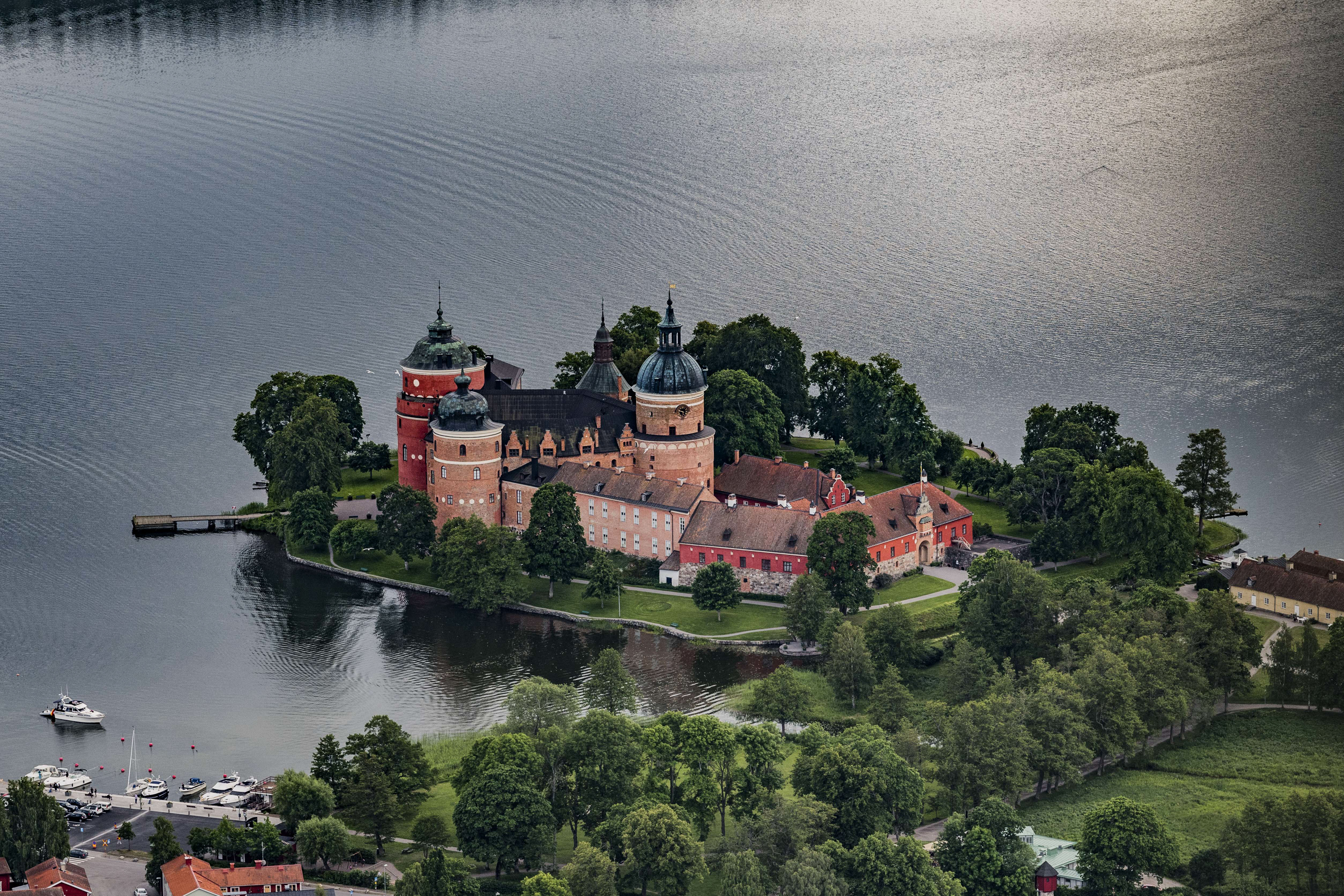
Aerial view

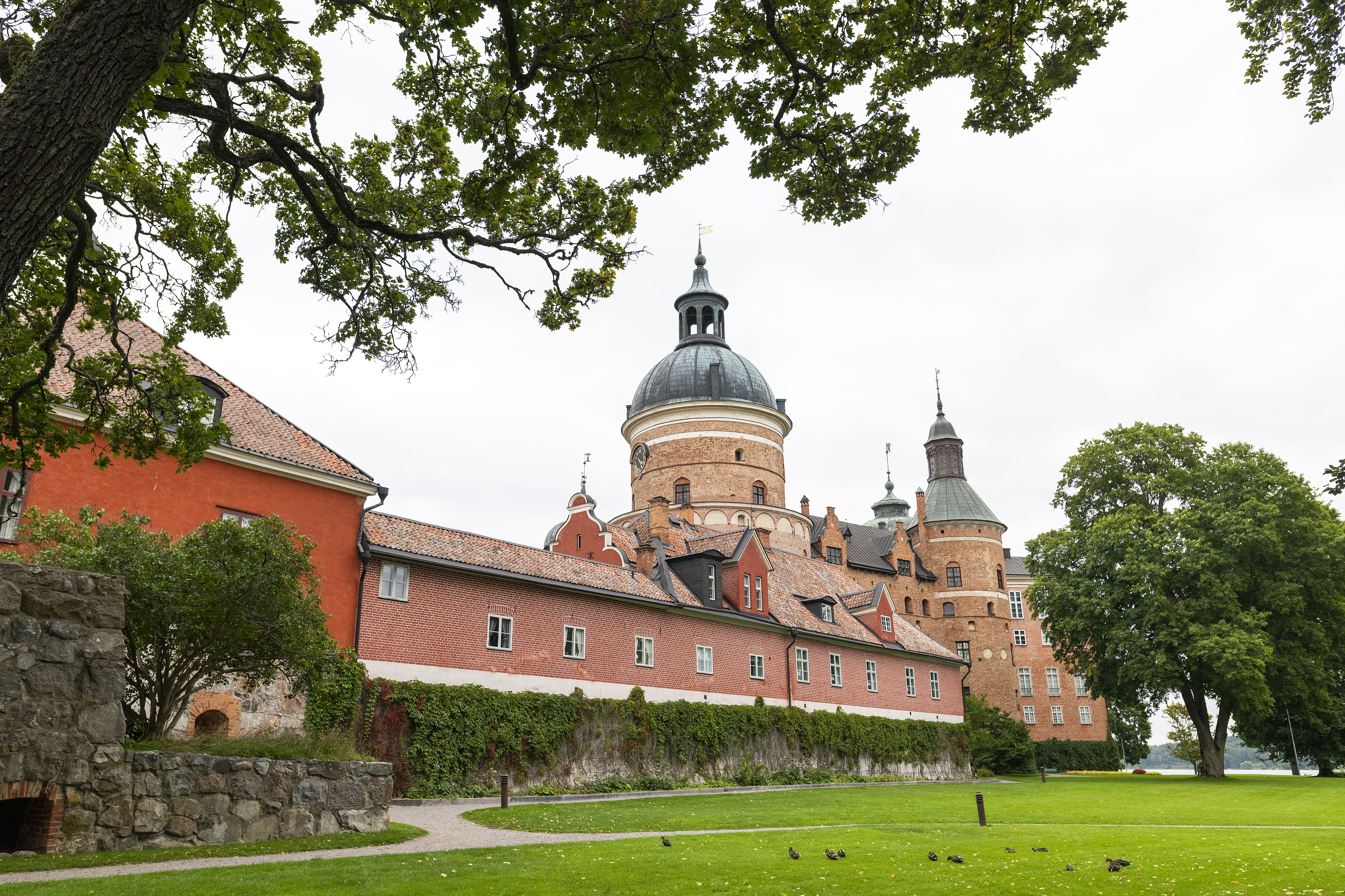
Southwestern wing

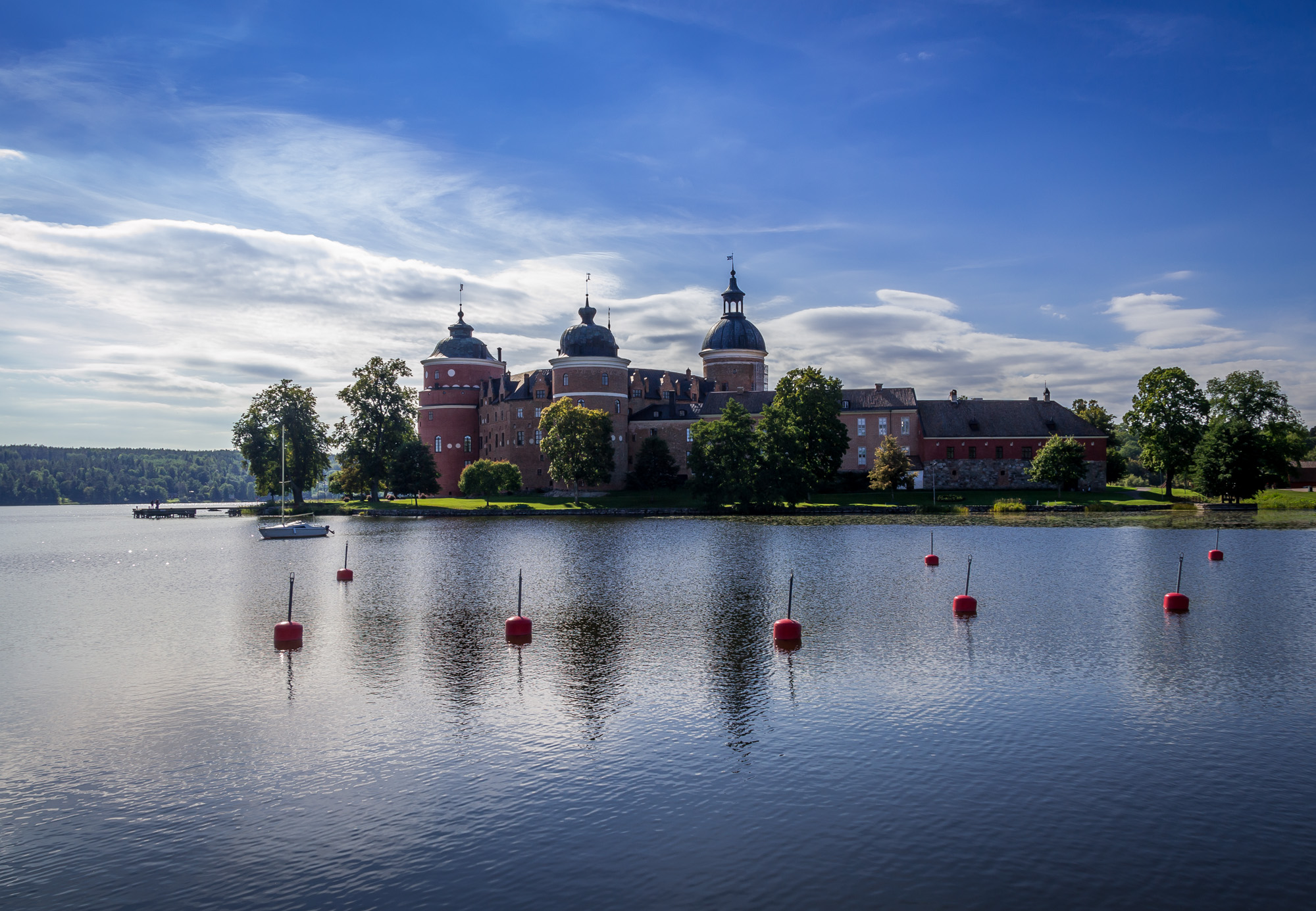
Gripsholm Castle viewed across Lake Mälaren

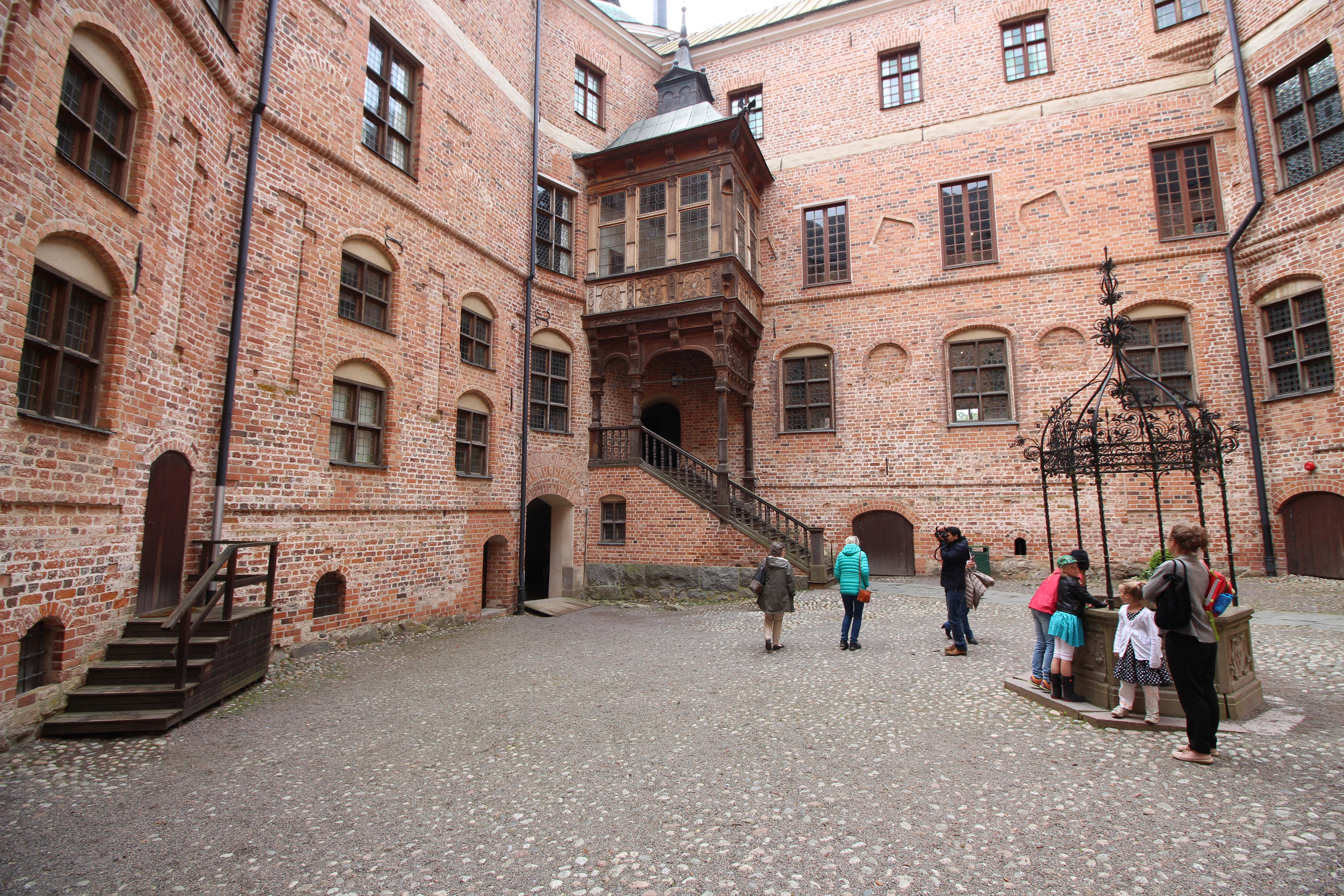
The inner courtyard

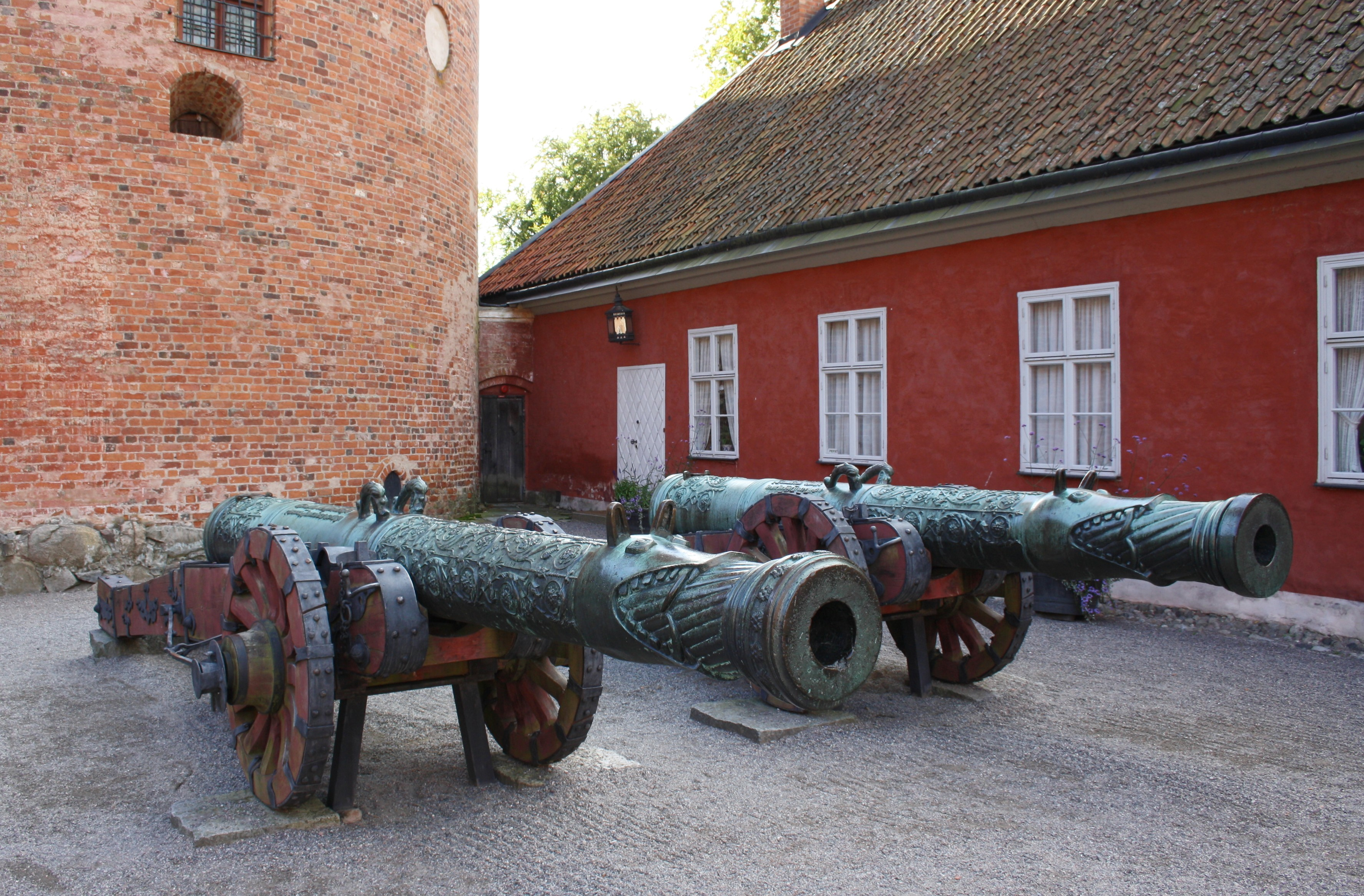
Russian cannons from the end of the 16th century

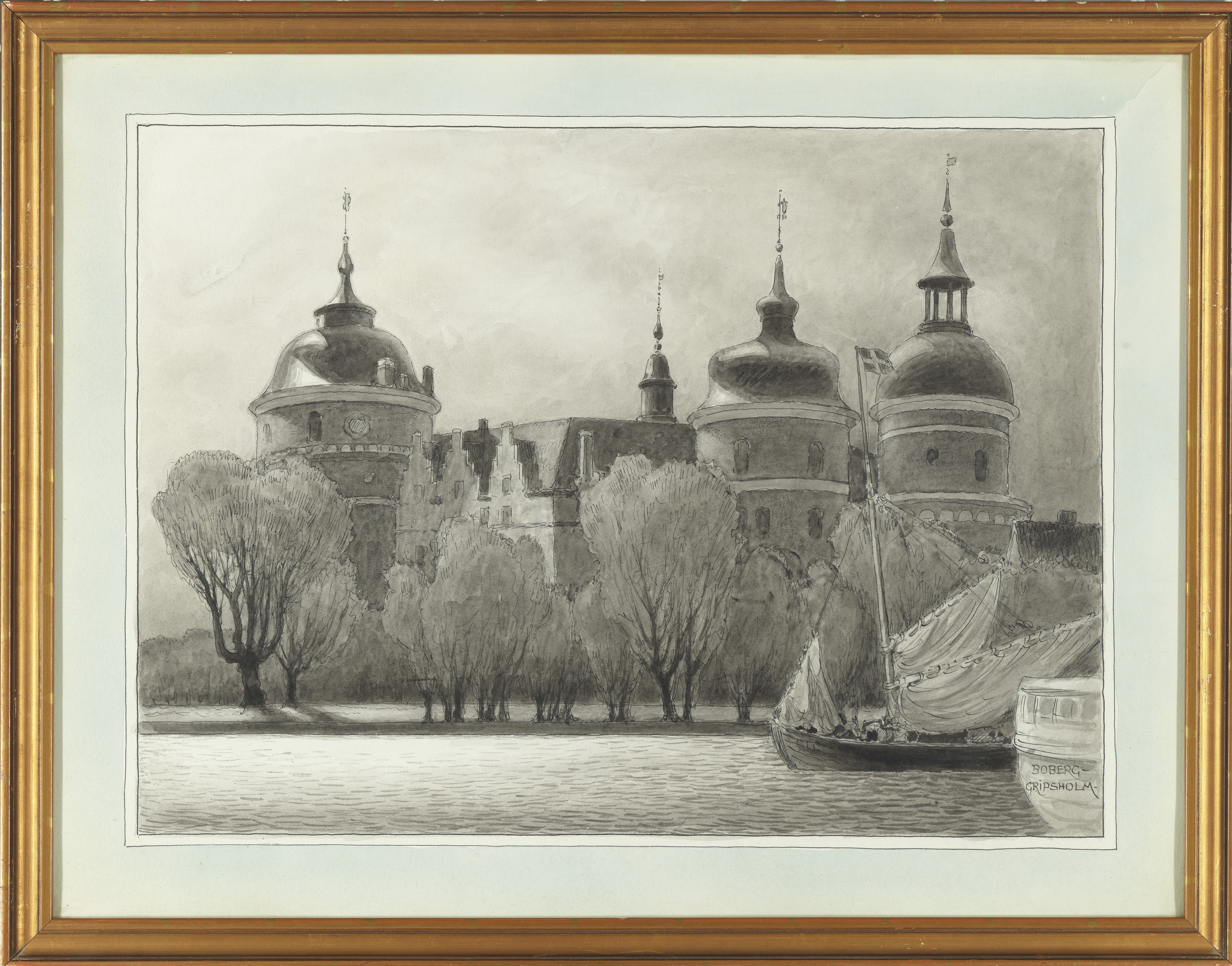
Drawing by Ferdinand Boberg, between 1915 and 1924

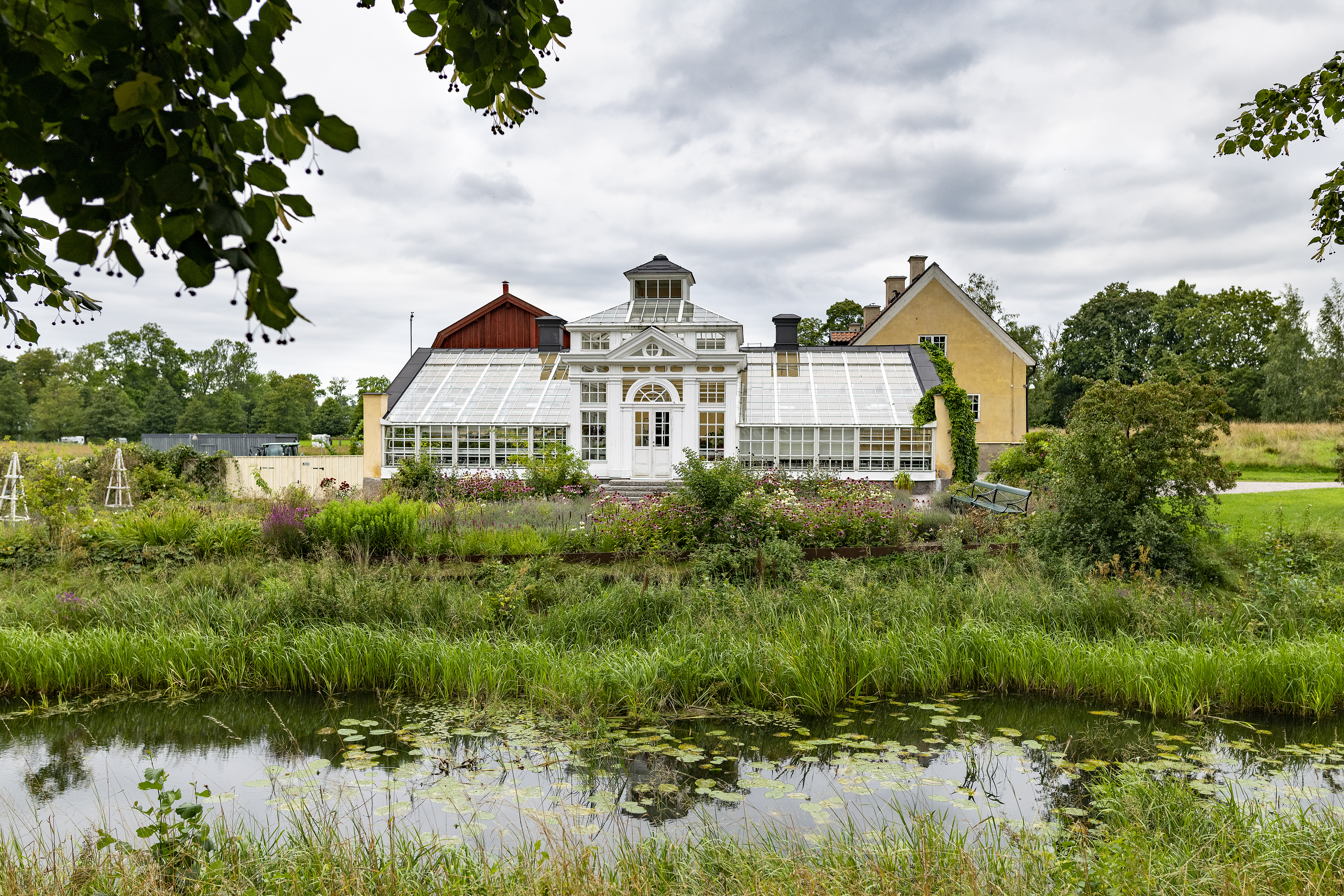
Greenhouse at Gripsholm Castle.

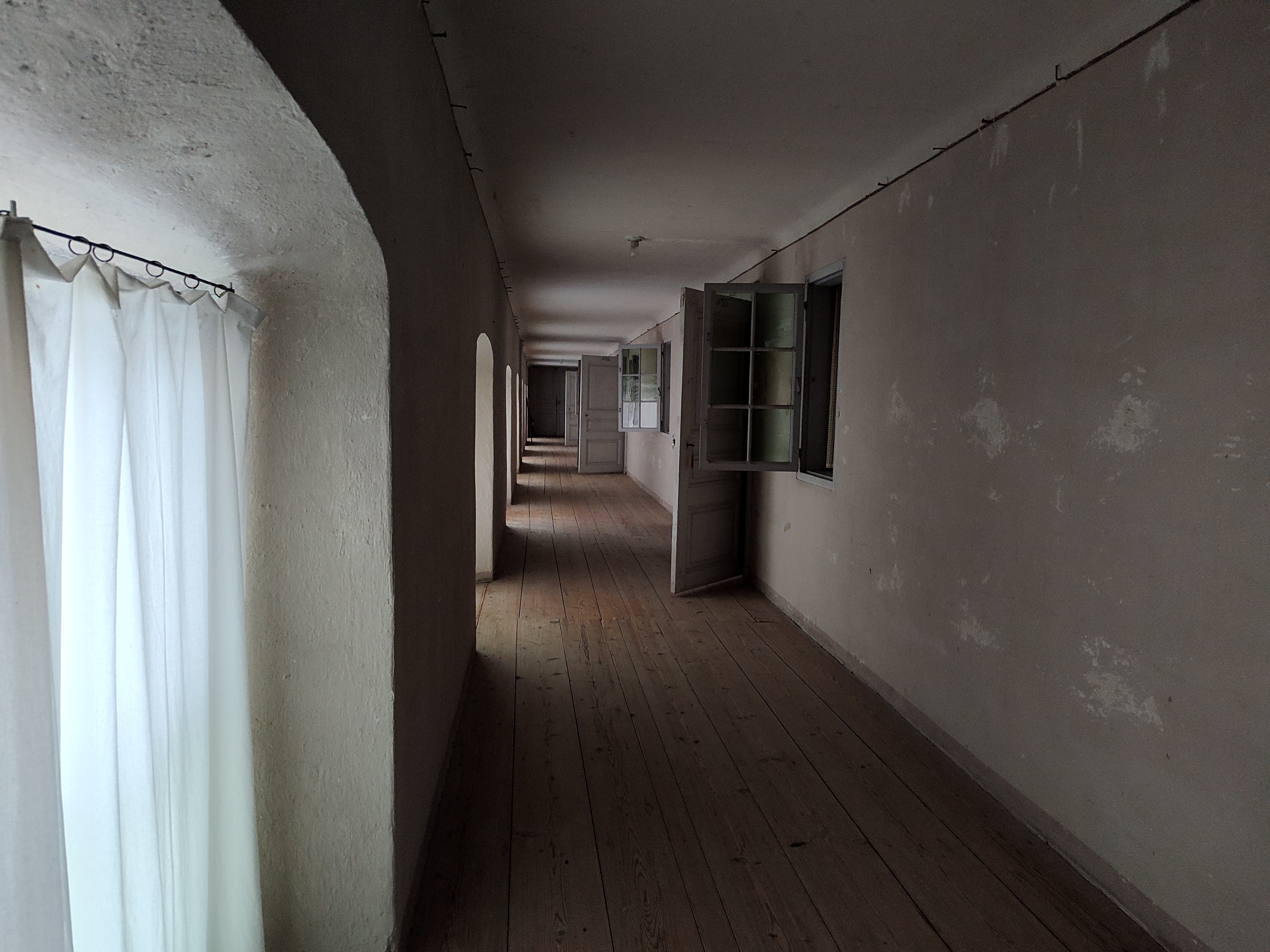
A corridor inside the castle

== Other sources ==
- Eriksson, Eva Den moderna stadens födelse: svensk arkitektur 1890–1920 (Ordfront, 1990)
- Gripsholm at the Nationalmuseum
- Legnér, Mattias (25 February 2013). ”Kakelugnen värmde under lilla istiden”. Svenska Dagbladet.
- Strömbom, Sixten Gripsholm: slottet och dess samlingar 1537–1937 (Nordisk rotogravyr, Stockholm: 1937)
- Svensk historia [microform) enligt samtida skildringar
- Tucholsky, Kurt: Schloss Gripsholm (1931 novel).
- Westlund, Per-Olof, Gripsholm under Vasatiden, 1949, Stockholm.
