= Chinese Pavilion at Drottningholm =

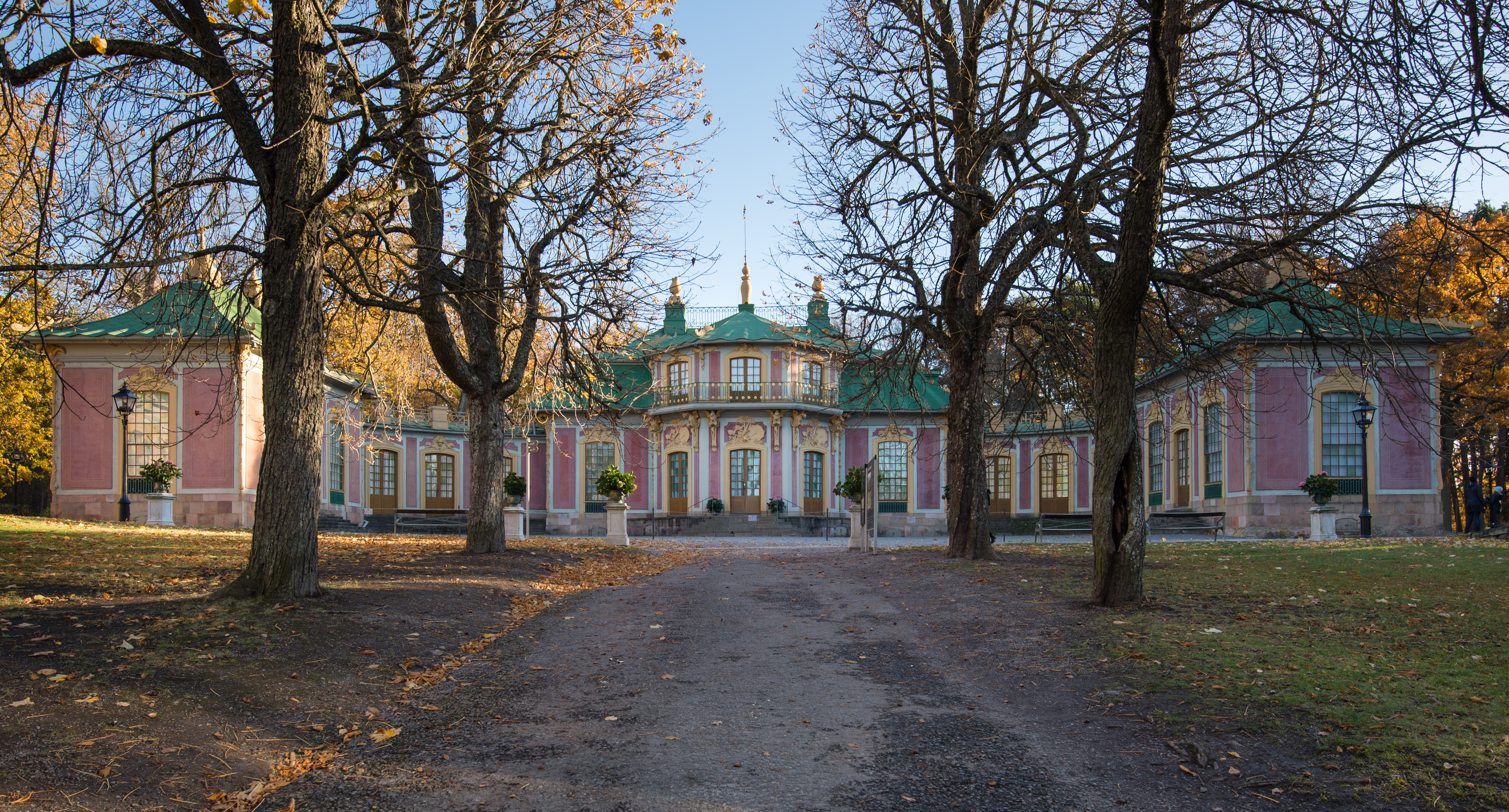
- The Chinese Pavilion, northern façade, 2016.
- Interactive map of Chinese Pavilion at Drottningholm
- 59°19′01″N 17°52′43″E
- Location: Ekerö Municipality, Svealand, Sweden

History
- Built: First pavilion 1753
- Demolished: 1763
- Rebuilt: Second pavilion and expansion 1763–1769

Site notes
- Area: 800 m^{2} (8,600 sq ft)
- Architect: Carl Fredrik Adelcrantz
- Architectural style: Chinoiserie
- Visitors: 42,000 (in 2010)

UNESCO World Heritage Site
- Official name: Part of the Royal Domain of Drottningholm
- Type: Cultural
- Criteria: iv
- Designated: 1991 (15th session)
- Reference no.: 559
- Country: Sweden
- Region: Europe and North America

The Chinese Pavilion (Swedish: Kina slott), located in the grounds of the Drottningholm Palace park, is a Chinese-inspired royal pavilion originally built between 1753 and 1769. The pavilion is currently one of Sweden's Royal Palaces and a UNESCO World Heritage Site.

== The first building ==
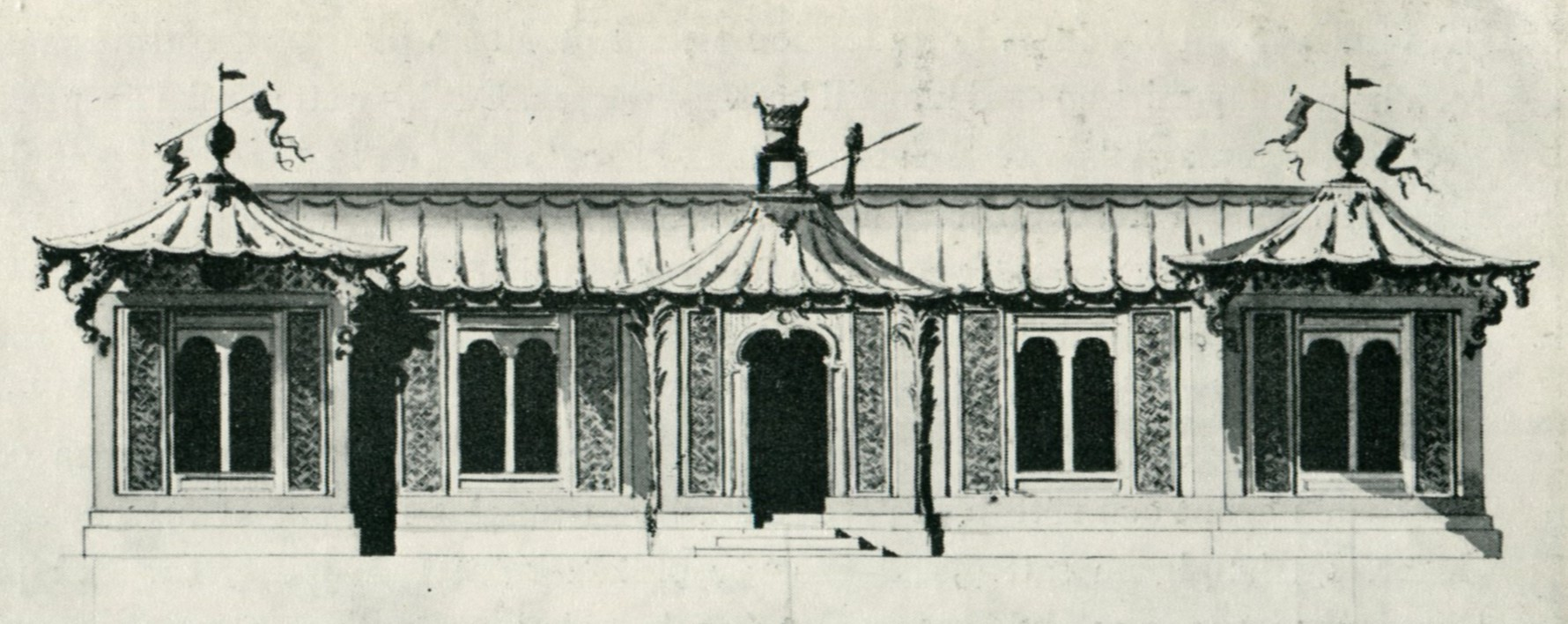
The first pavilion, drawing by Carl Hårleman, 1750.

The first building was a simple pavilion with two wings in Chinese style. The buildings were prefabricated at Arsenalsgatan in Stockholm. They were made in the log cabin technique and shipped to Drottningholm, where they were assembled. The architects were probably Court Supervisors Carl Hårleman and Carl Johan Cronstedt. Everything was finished and in place in time for Queen Lovisa Ulrika's birthday on 24 July 1753. The pavilion was a surprise gift to the Queen from King Adolf Frederick. At the presentation, she received the gold key to the castle from the young Crown Prince Gustav (later King Gustav III), seven years old, dressed as a Chinese mandarin.

In a letter to her mother, Queen Sophia Dorothea of Prussia, the Queen wrote:

He brought me to one side of the garden and I was surprised to suddenly be part of a fairy tale, for the King had built a Chinese castle, the most beautiful one can see.

Having been built in haste and secrecy, the small castle did not endure the harsh Swedish climate. After ten years, rot had begun to attack the wooden frame and the King and Queen commissioned Carl Fredrik Adelcrantz to create a new and bigger pavilion made from more durable materials.

== The second building ==
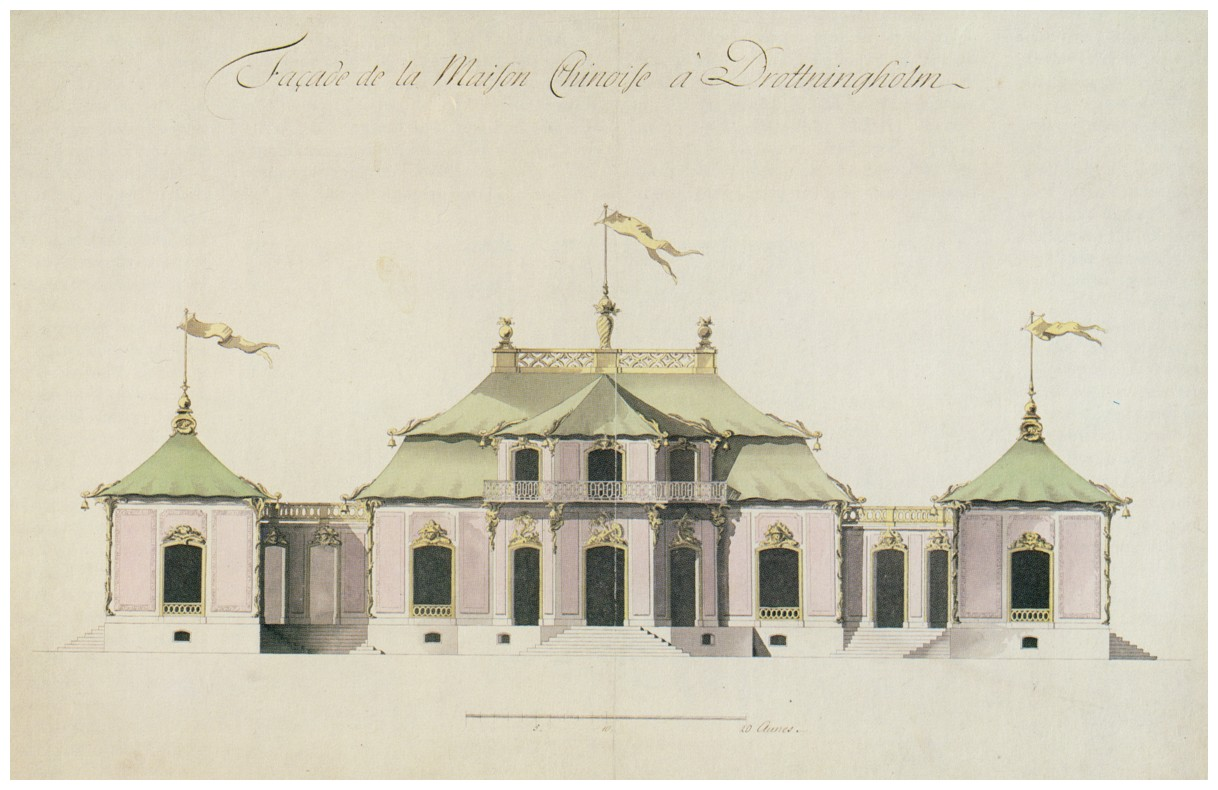
Drawing by Carl Fredrik Adelcrantz, 1763.

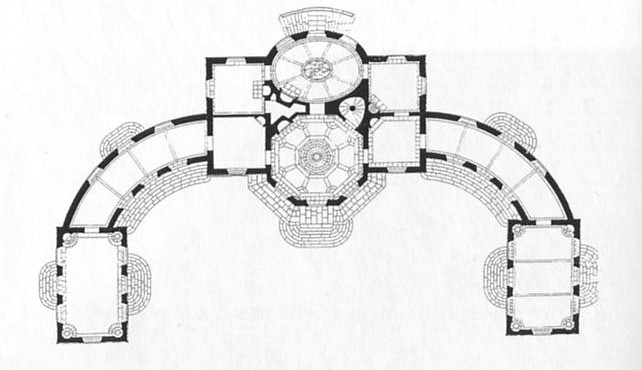
Floor plan.

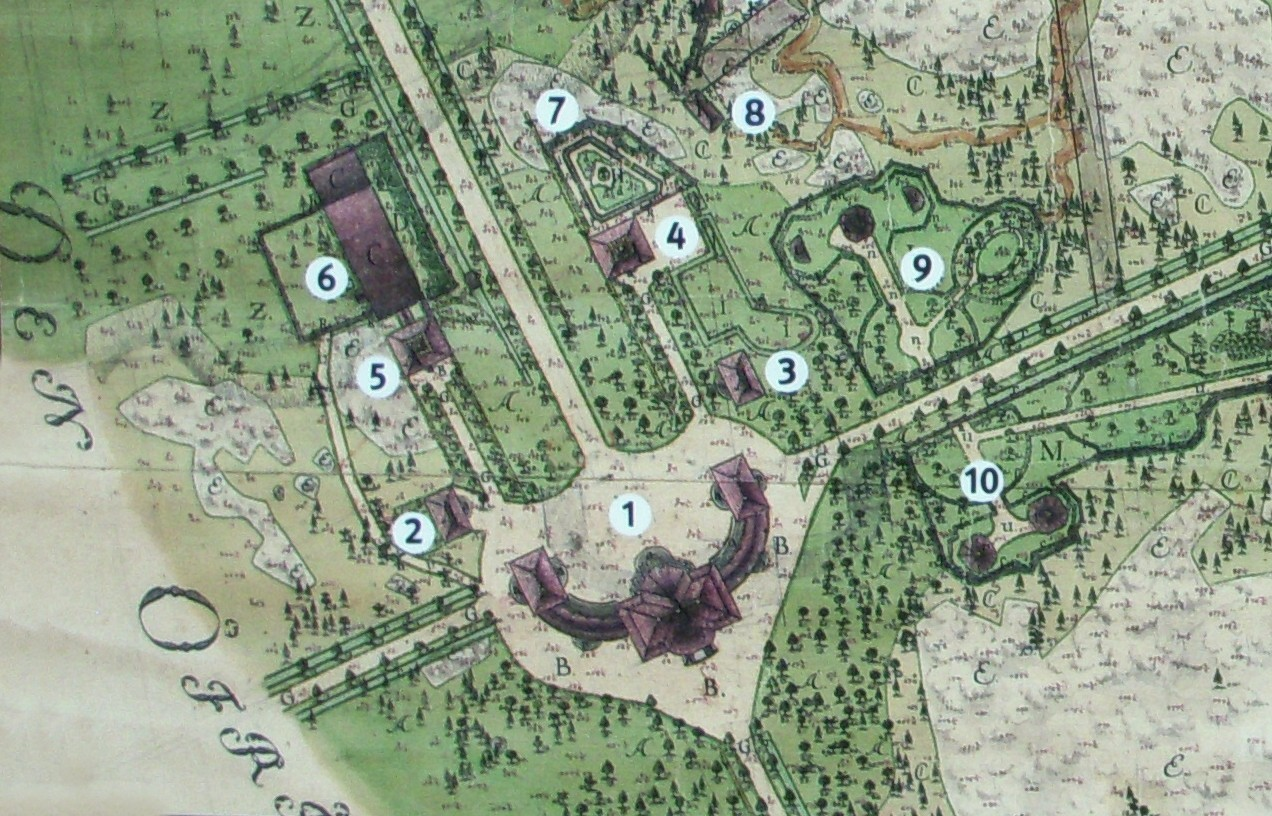
The area around the Chinese Pavilion, 1779. 1 The Chinese Pavilion, main building 2 The west wing (The Silver Chamber) 3 The east wing (The Billiard) 4 King Adolf Frederick's studio 5 The Confidence 6 The kitchen (As of 1957 a summer café) 7 The garden 8 Living quarters (demolished) 9 och 10 The aviary (The Volière) and bowers

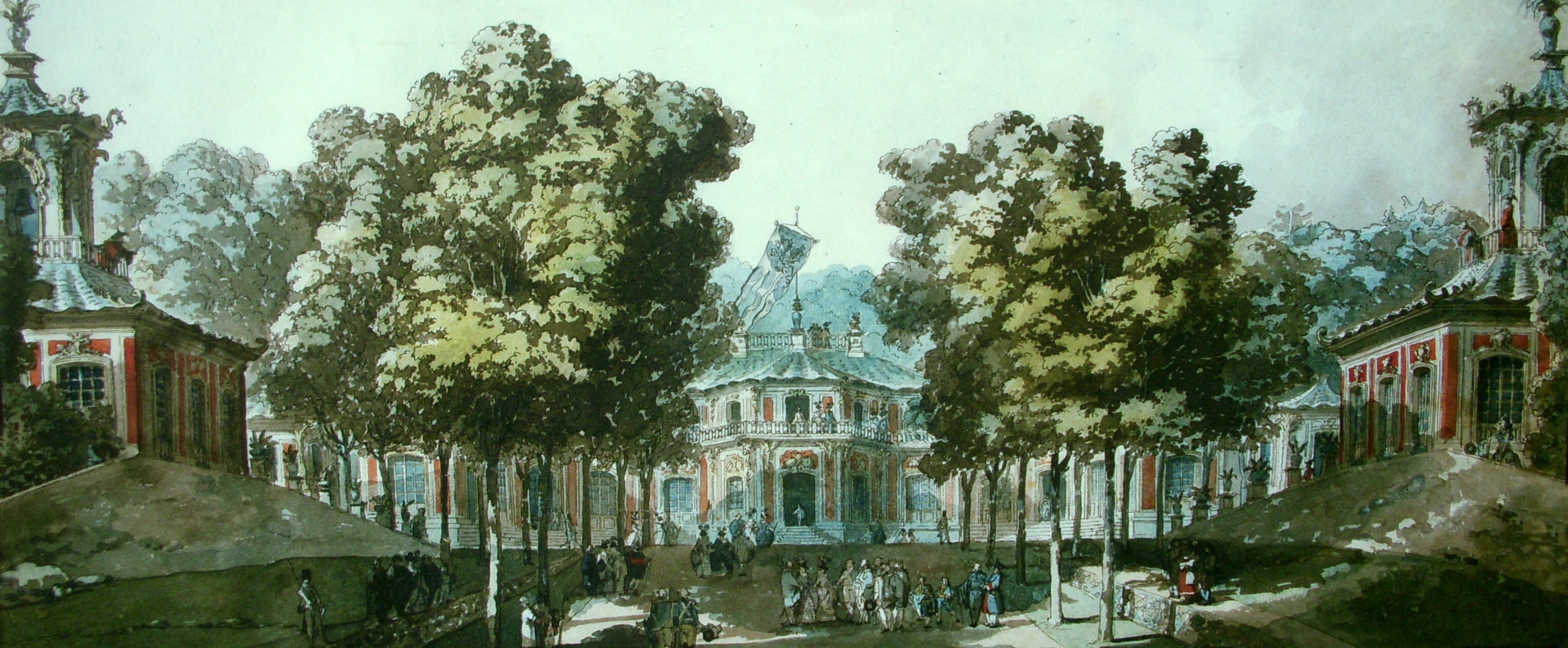
Chinese Pavilion in 1788, illustrated by Louis Jean Desprez

The second and current structure replaced the old wooden pavilion from 1753. Designed by Carl Fredrik Adelcrantz, construction began in 1763 and was completed in 1769.

=== Interior ===
The royal court's chief supervisor, Jean Eric Rehn, led the interior design work. The architecture is essentially rococo and was intended to have an exotic character, containing Chinese elements, which were considered the height of fashion at the time.

The rooms of the pavilion are full of luxury items brought to Sweden from China by the Swedish East India Company: porcelain, silk, lacquers, etc. China had become a fascination to Swedes and having a Chinese room or objects had become important for the nobles.

The walls in the Yellow Room are covered with Chinese lacquered panels, at the time a fascinating technique since no parallel craft existed in Europe. The panels depict relations between Asia and Europe in the 1700s. The motifs are scenes from Canton (now known as Guangzhou) by the Pearl River and the European Thirteen Factories separated from the city by double walls.

=== Exterior and garden ===
The wings are connected to the main building by a series of curved rooms. Lacquer-red walls used for the façade and the sculptural ornamentation show good knowledge of Chinese buildings, but the structure of the building is characterized as clearly European. The interior is among the foremost in Swedish Rococo design.

There are four houses, also in Chinese style, just north of the pavilion. The east one, northeast of the pavilion, is called The Billiard. It used to house a billiard table which is now gone. Instead, two of King Adolf Frederick's lathes are on display together with tools from the lathe chamber. The house to the west, northwest of the pavilion, is known as The Silver Chamber.

A bit further north, resting on a high base, is the Adolf Frederick's Studio (to the right) and the Confidence (to the left). The Confidence is a dining room building where the tables (dining and serving table) are fixed on a lift device. The tables were set on the floor below the royal dining room and on a given signal they were hoisted up through the floor. This meant that the royals could eat their dinner without the presence of servants, en confidence (French for "in confidence"). North of The Confidence is the old kitchen. As of 1957 it houses a café in the summers. In the park east of the Chinese Pavilion is a pagoda-like gazebo called The Volière (French for aviary).

The Pavilion underwent exterior renovations in 1927–1928, 1943–1955 and an interior in 1959–1968. Another thorough restoration of the exterior was made in 1989–1996.

== The Chinese pagoda ==
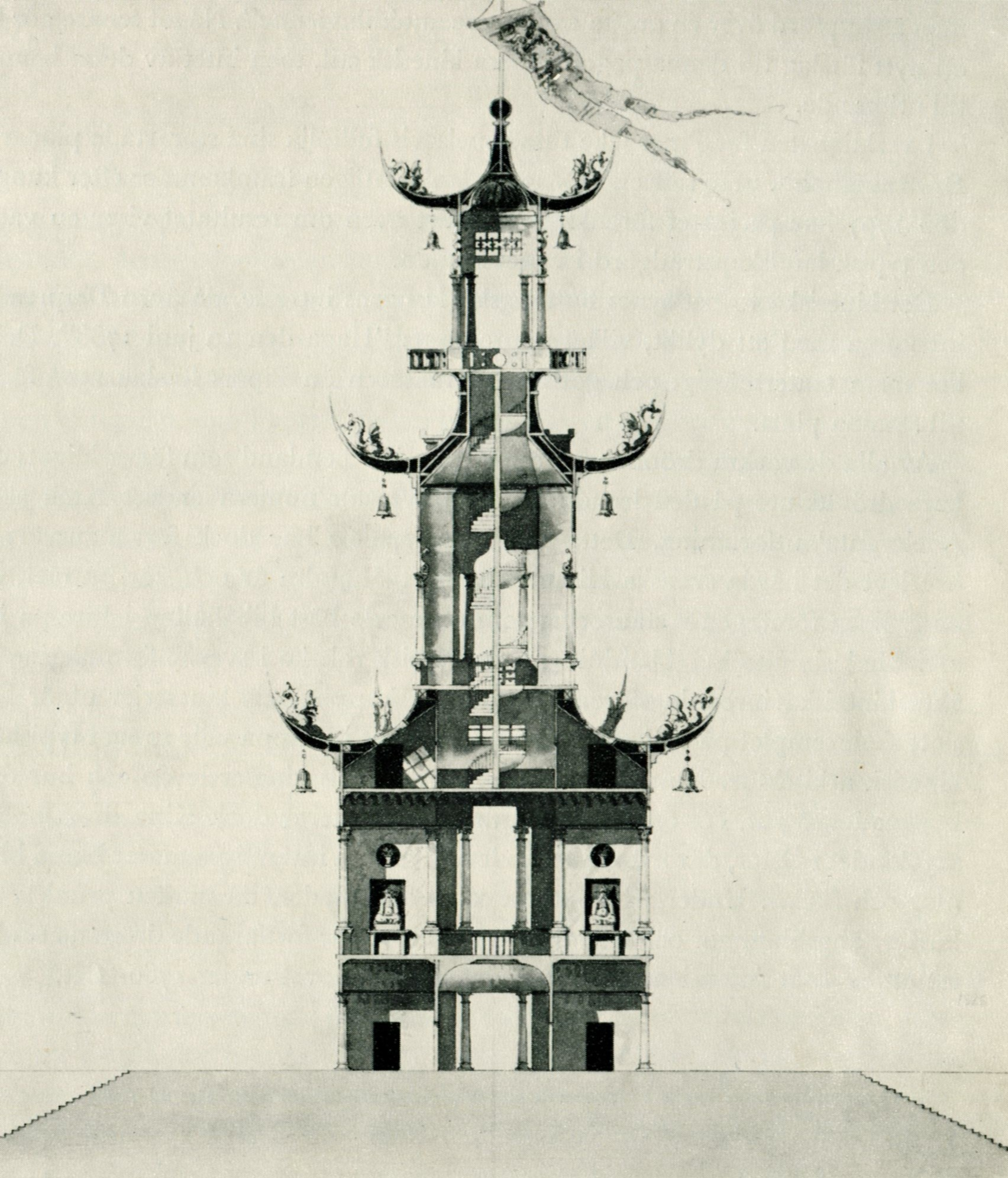
Desprez's drawing of the pagoda, 1788.

During the reign of King Gustav III, plans were made for a Chinese pagoda on the Flora Hill just east of the Chinese Pavilion. The project, as with most of King's ideas for buildings within the English garden, were never realized because of the assassination of the King. All the elements necessary for a royal English style pleasure garden were already present in 1781, when Fredrik Magnus Piper drew up the plans for the park. These included streams, bridges, knolls, sloping lawns (French: pelouse) and several small pavilions and gazebos in different styles.

In Piper's 1797 land use plan, one extension to the north was to contain a cave with canals and cascades, a small lake with bridges and walking paths, and a Turkish pavilion. To the east of the Chinese Pavilion at Flora Hill a Chinese pagoda would act as a connecting pont de vue (endpoint in a line of sight) between the Chinese quarter and the English Garden across Nicodemus Tessin the Younger's strict Baroque garden.

== Burglary ==
On 6 August 2010, at 2:00 am, burglars broke into the Chinese Pavilion via the double doors at the back of the house. Once inside, they broke three showcases and stole a number of objects. The alarm system worked but the entire burglary took just six minutes. The collection at the Chinese Pavilion consists of, among other things, Chinese clay figurines, porcelain dolls, urns, lacquer furniture and other art pieces from China dating to 1753. The Royal Court have confirmed that the permanent state collection was on display at the time of the break-in. The pieces are considered priceless. The thieves fled from the pavilion on a moped which was found by the Mälaren lake. The police suspected that the thieves left by boat and that the robbery had been specially commissioned. It was the first time the Chinese Pavilion had been burgled.

The stolen objects were: a small Japanese lacquered box on a stand, a sculpture in green soapstone, a red lacquered chalice with a lid, a chalice carved from a rhinoceros horn, a small blackened, bronze teapot and a plate made of musk wood. Several other pieces were damaged during the break-in. Detailed descriptions and photos of the stolen items can be found at the referenced link. As of 2019, the stolen objects have been recovered, and arrests have been made.

== Kantongatan ==
Kantongatan, ("Canton Street") is a street that marks the southwest border of the Drottningholm Palace park and starts on the shore of Lake Mälaren. The street and its houses were established by Queen Lovisa Ulrika and King Adolf Frederick as a small factory community called Kanton. Manufacturers of fine forging, lace-making and silk weaving worked here. Mulberry trees were planted for silkworm breeding, but the climate was too cold and the project only lasted about ten years. At the south end of the street is a house called Lilla Kina ("Little China"). It was built at the same time as the first Pavilion in 1753. It has been used for various things over the years, at one time being the home of Anna Sophia Hagman, official royal mistress to Prince Frederick Adolf of Sweden.

The Kanton community is also considered one of the models for the Swedish garden city. As of 2014, all the houses are used as private housing.

== UNESCO World Heritage Site ==
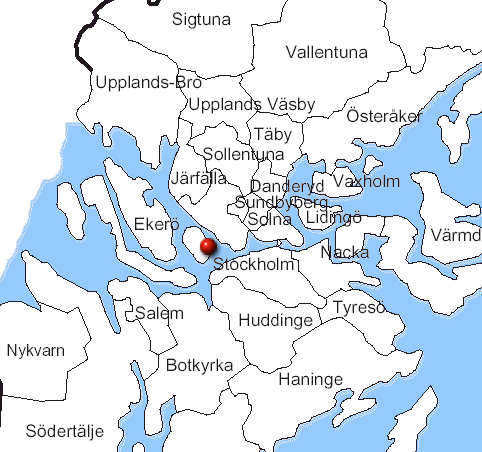
Location of Drottningholm, Municipalities of Stockholm.

The Chinese Pavilion was one of the main reasons the Drottningholm Palace was added as a UNESCO World Heritage Site in 1991. The UNESCO comments were:

The Royal Domain of Drottningholm stands on an island in Lake Mälar in a suburb of Stockholm. With its palace, perfectly preserved theatre (built in 1766), Chinese pavilion and gardens, it is the finest example of an 18th-century northern European royal residence inspired by the Palace of Versailles.

== Gallery ==
=== Exterior ===
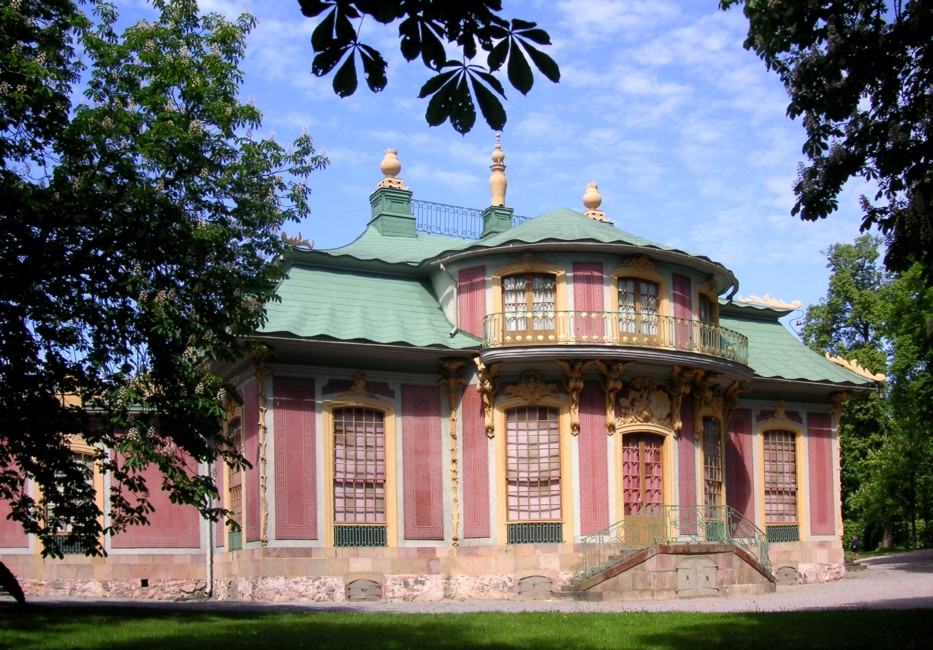
Chinese Pavilion, southern façade.

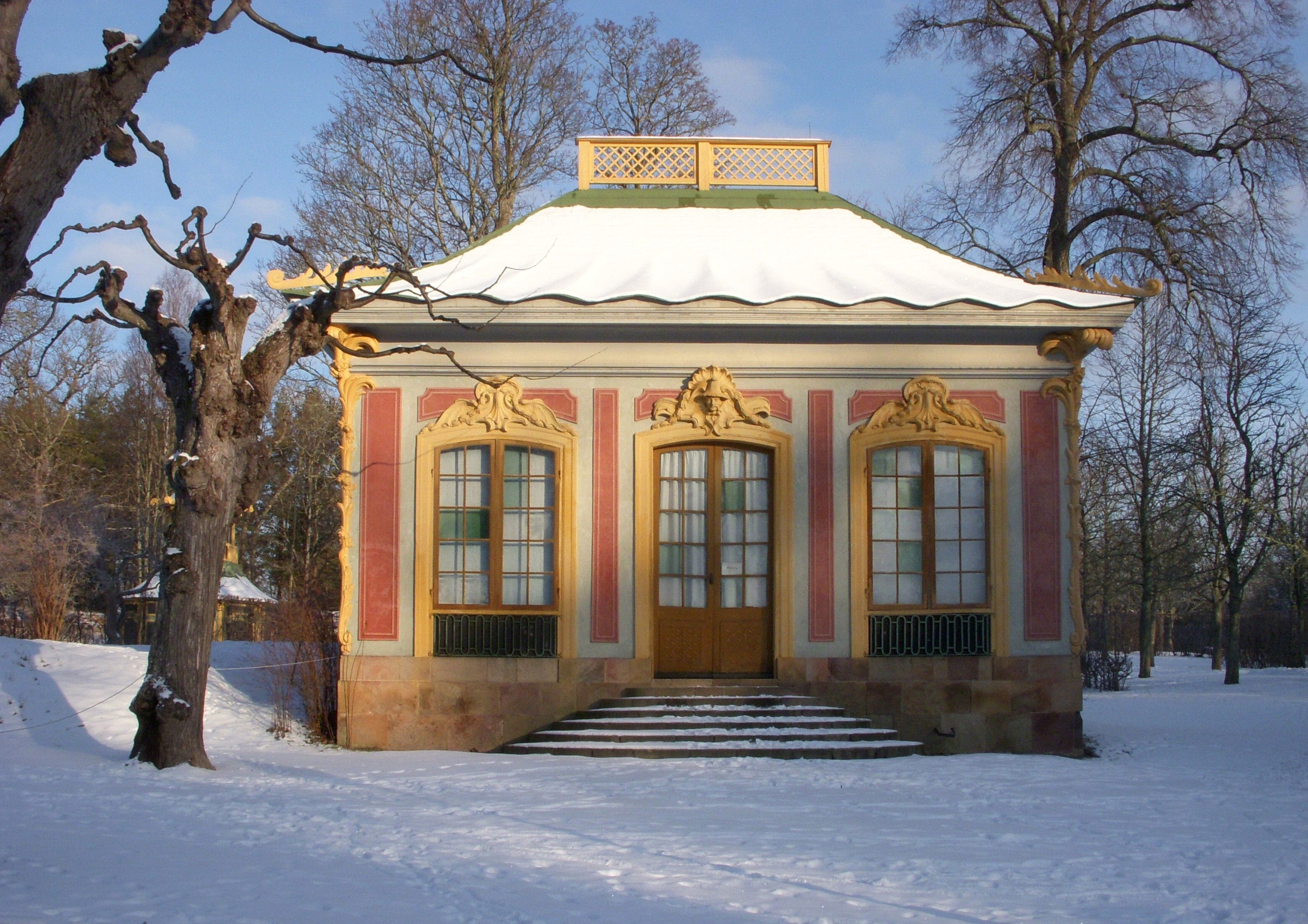
The west wing, "The Silver Chamber".

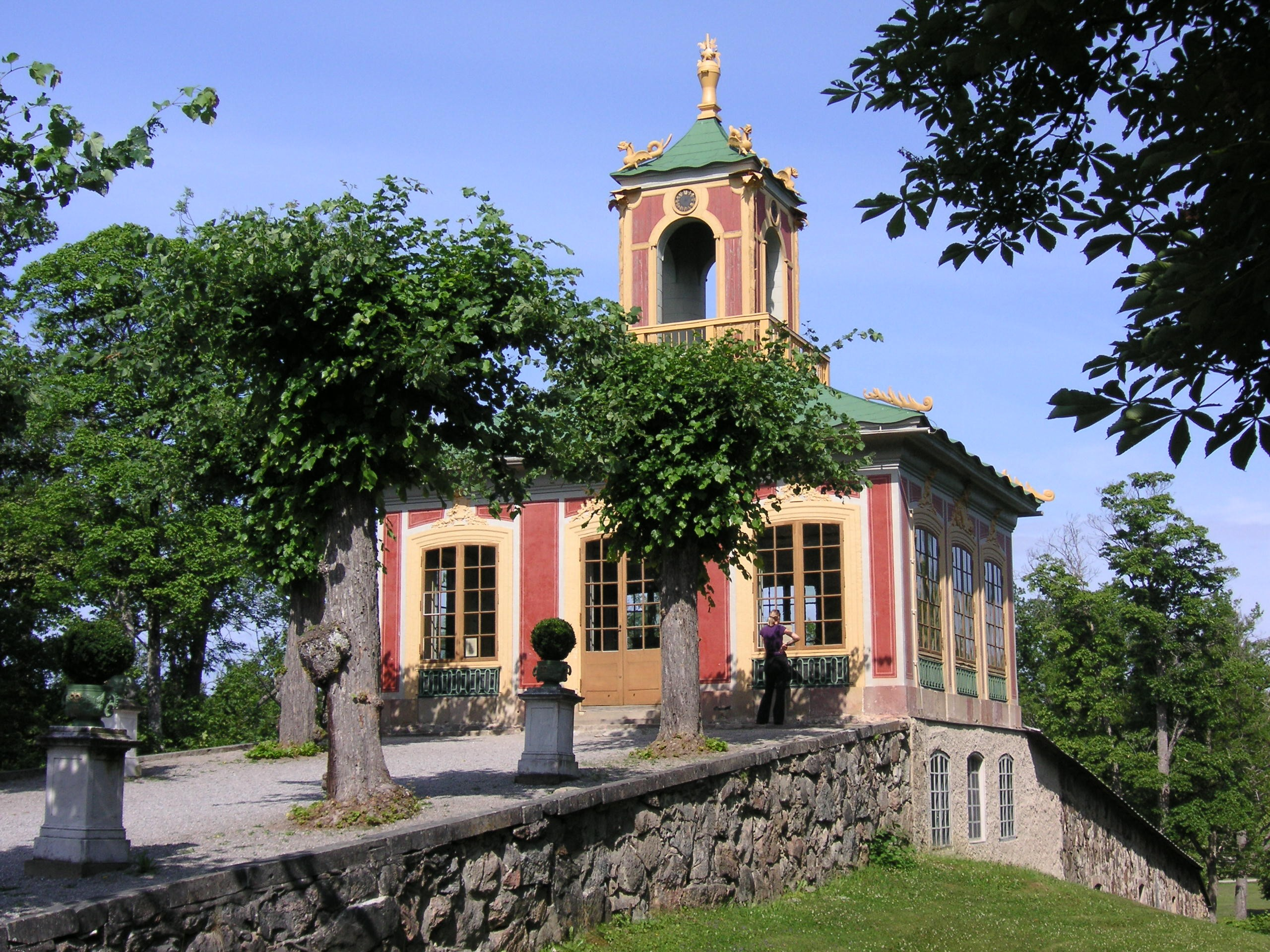
The Confidence, a house next to the Chinese Pavilion.

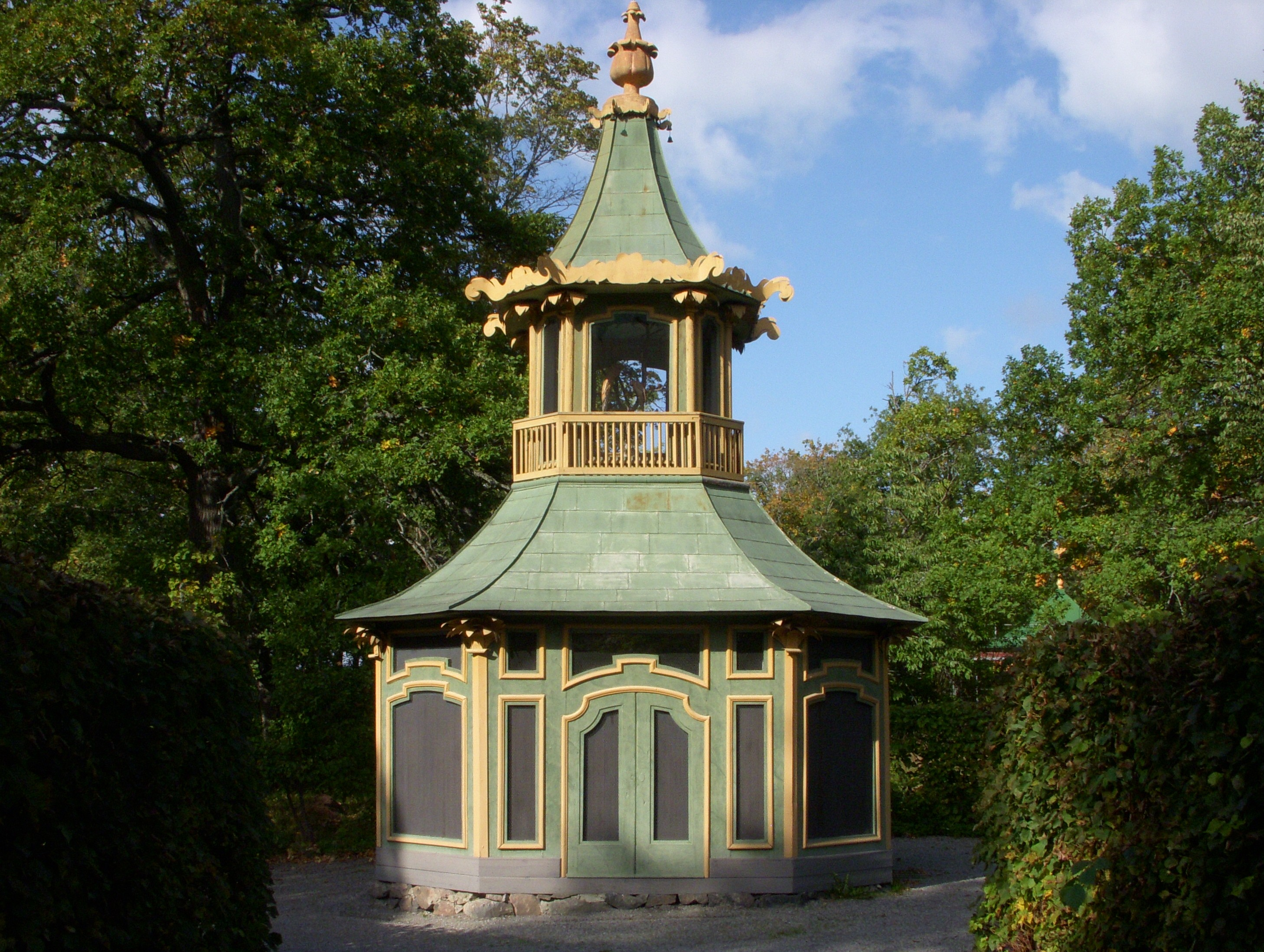
The Volière.

=== Details on the façade ===
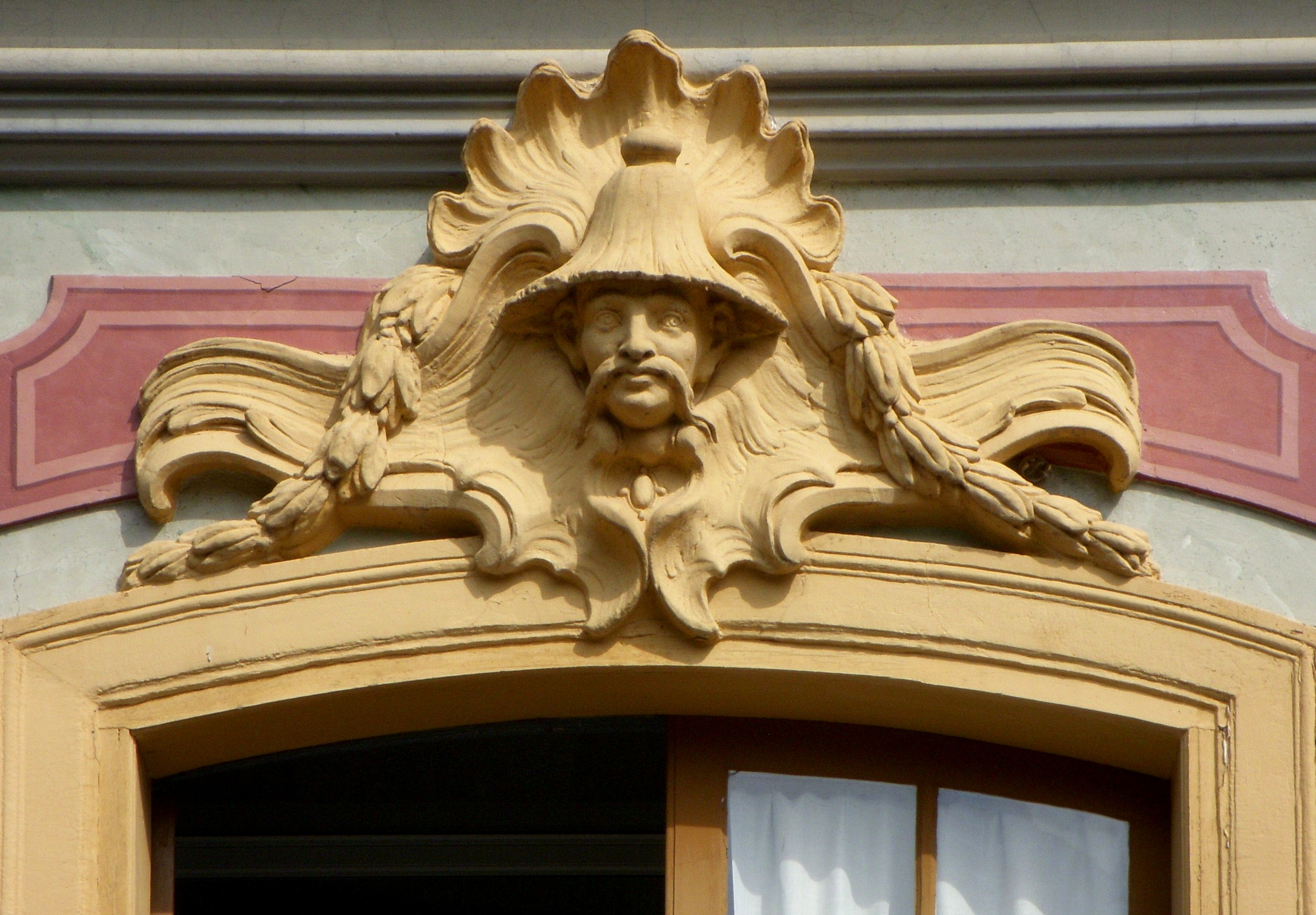

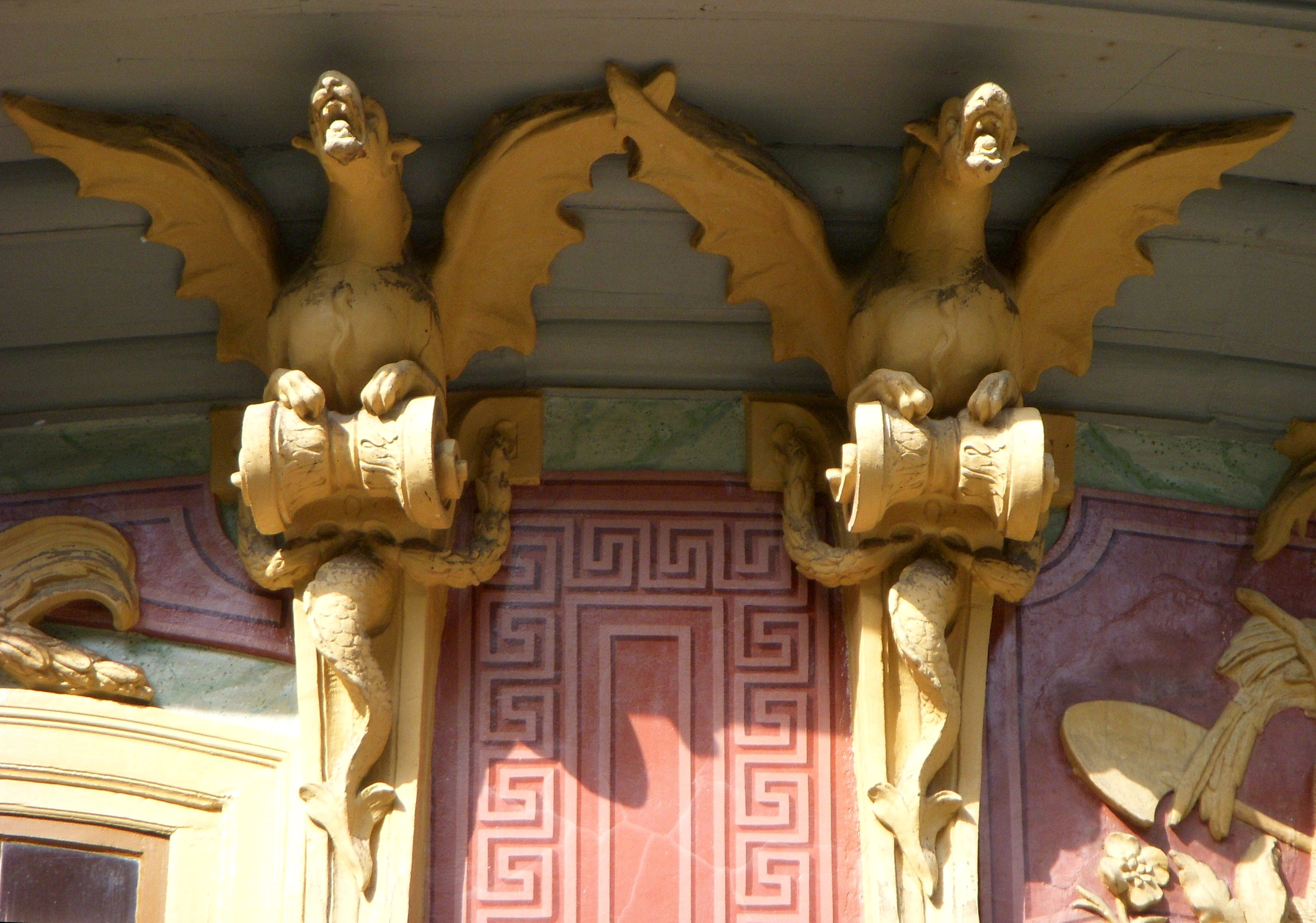

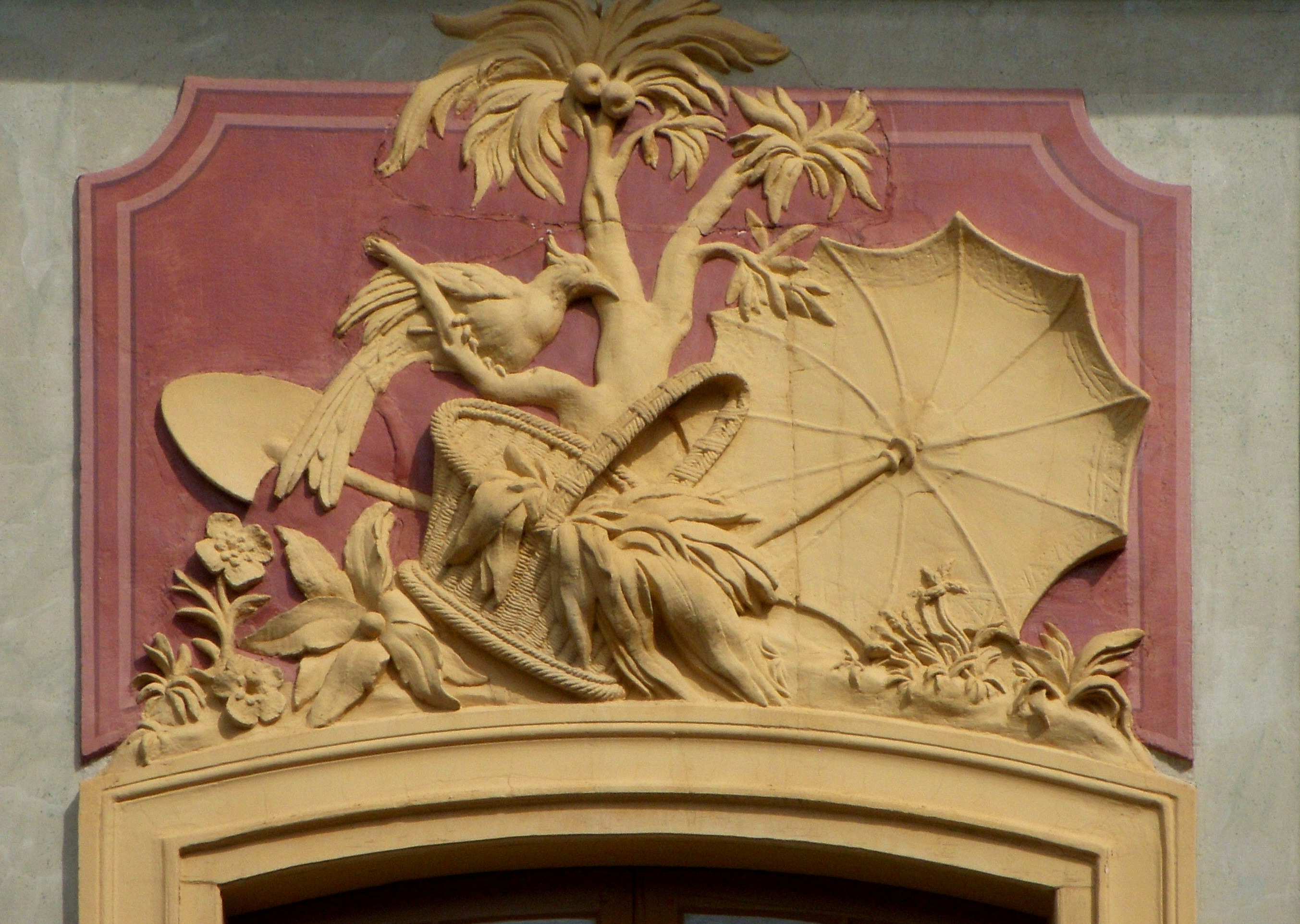

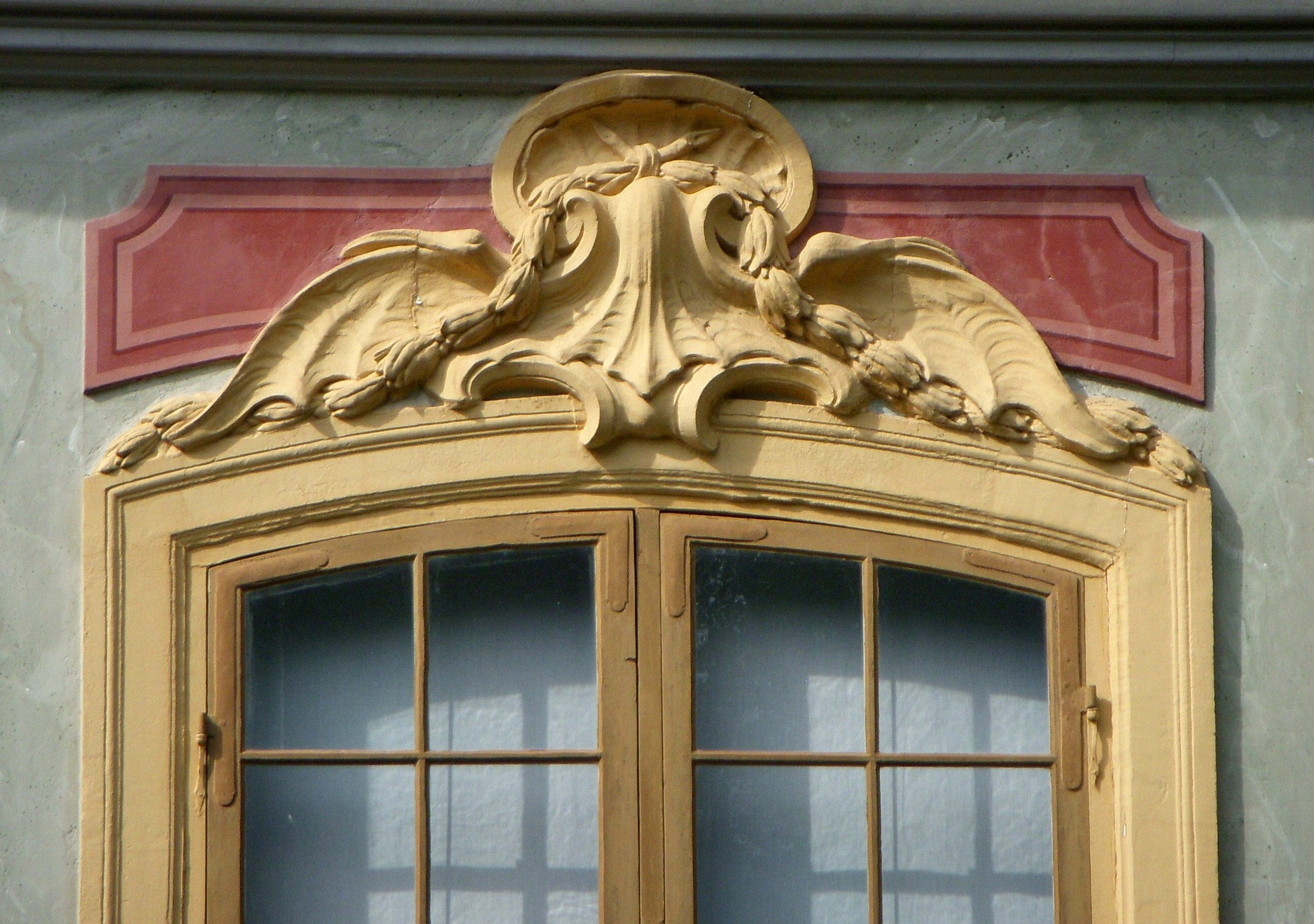

=== Interior ===
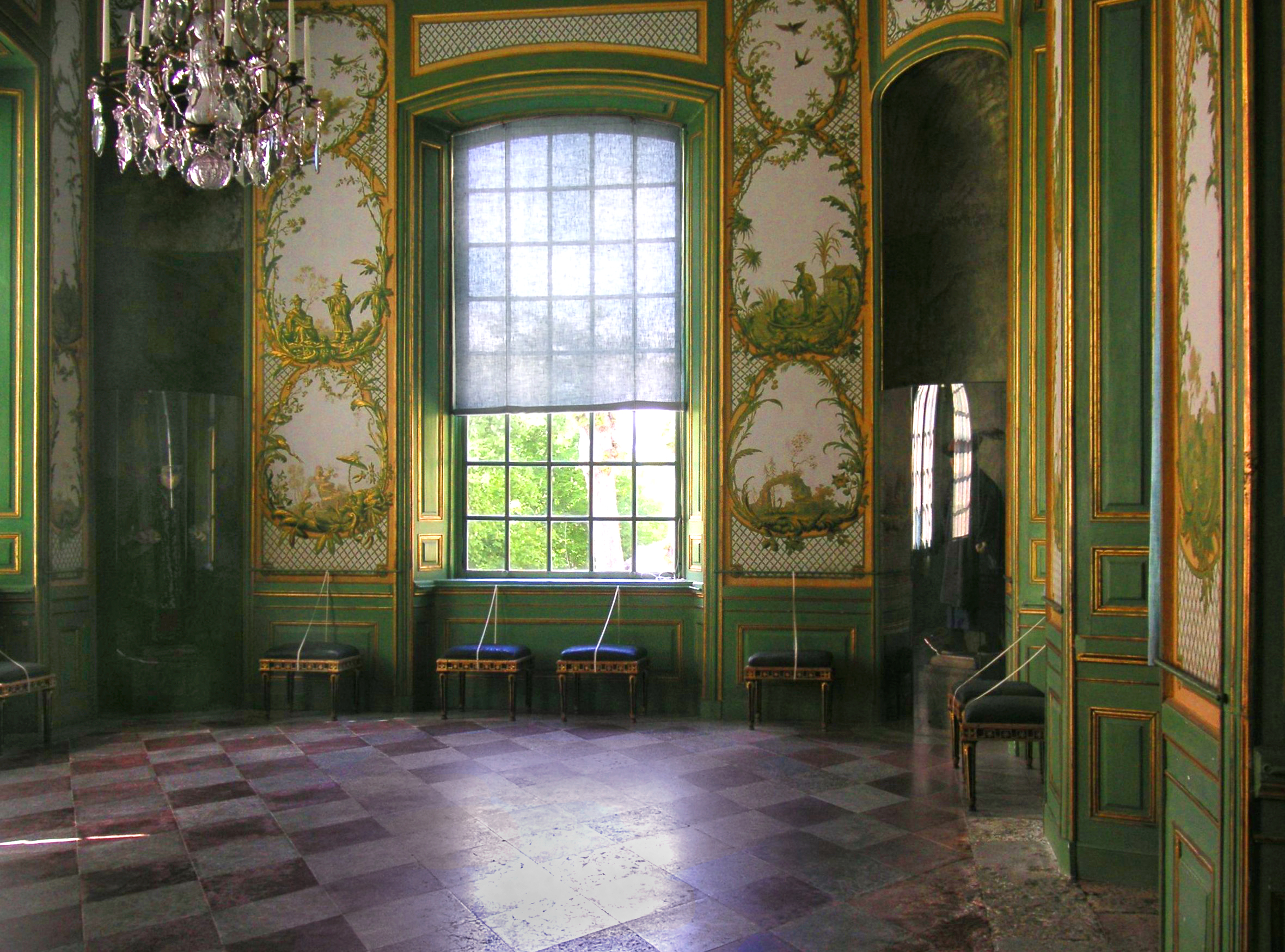
The green parlour in the Chinese Pavilion.

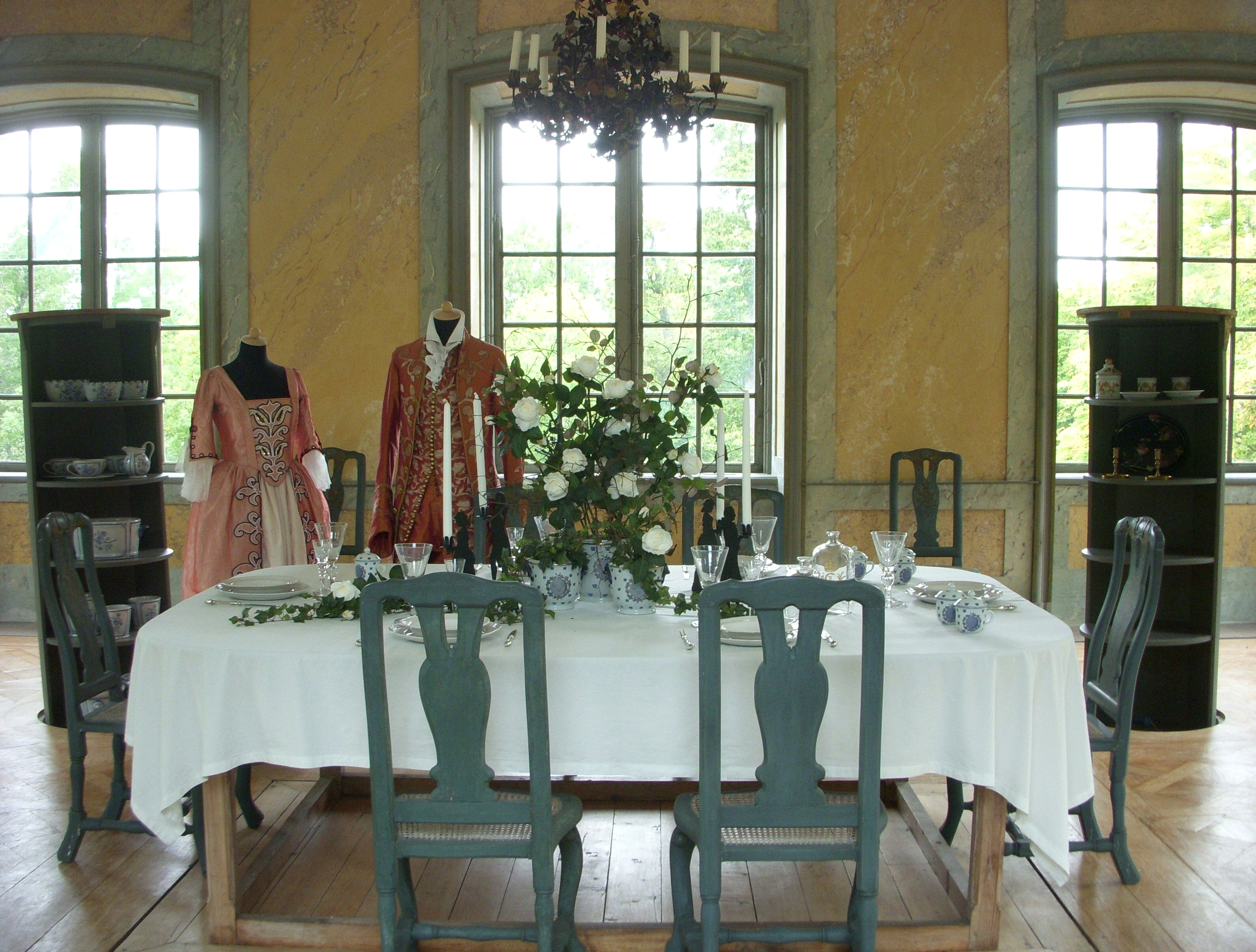
The Confidence, dining table.

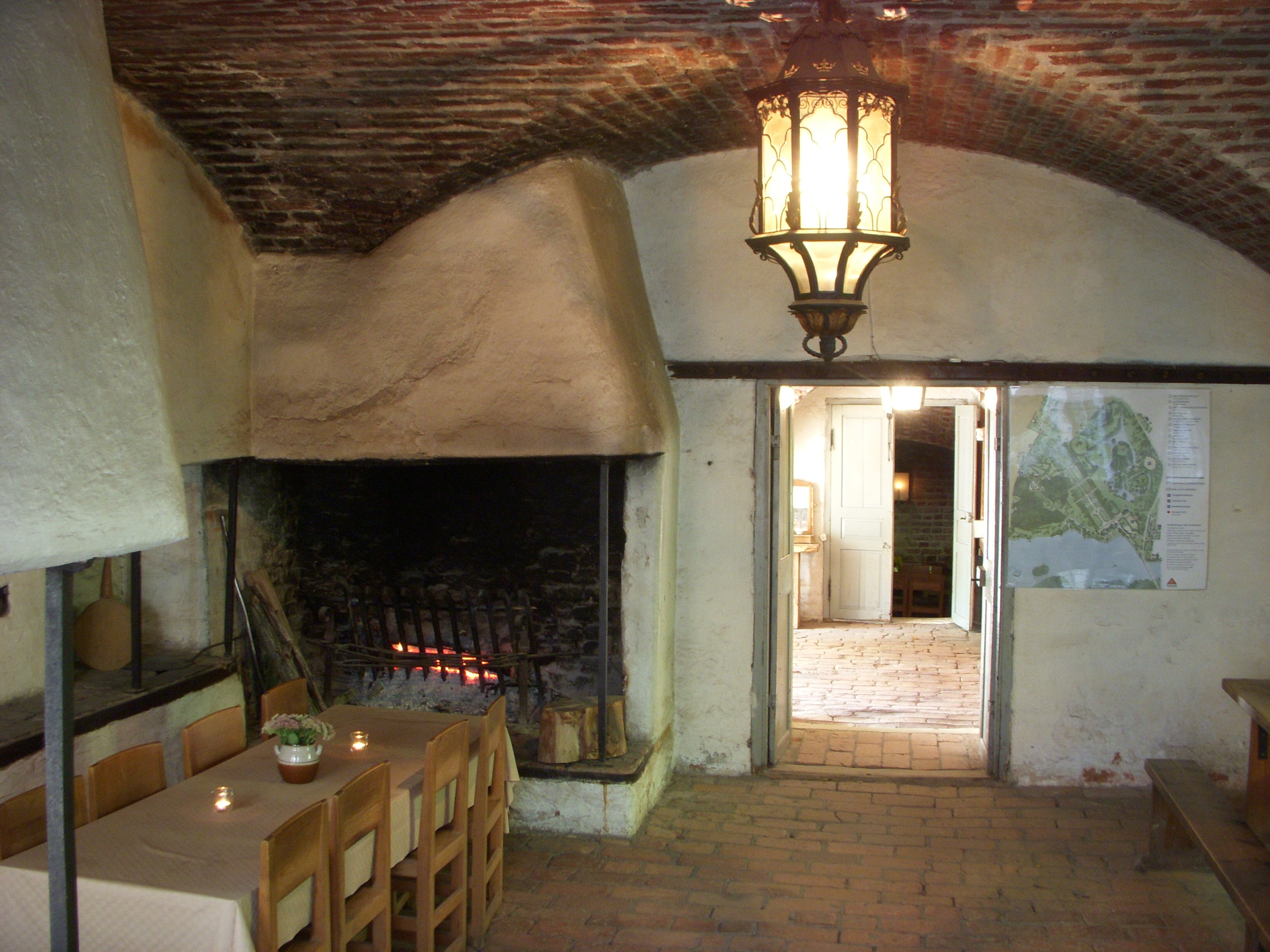
The Confidence, kitchen.

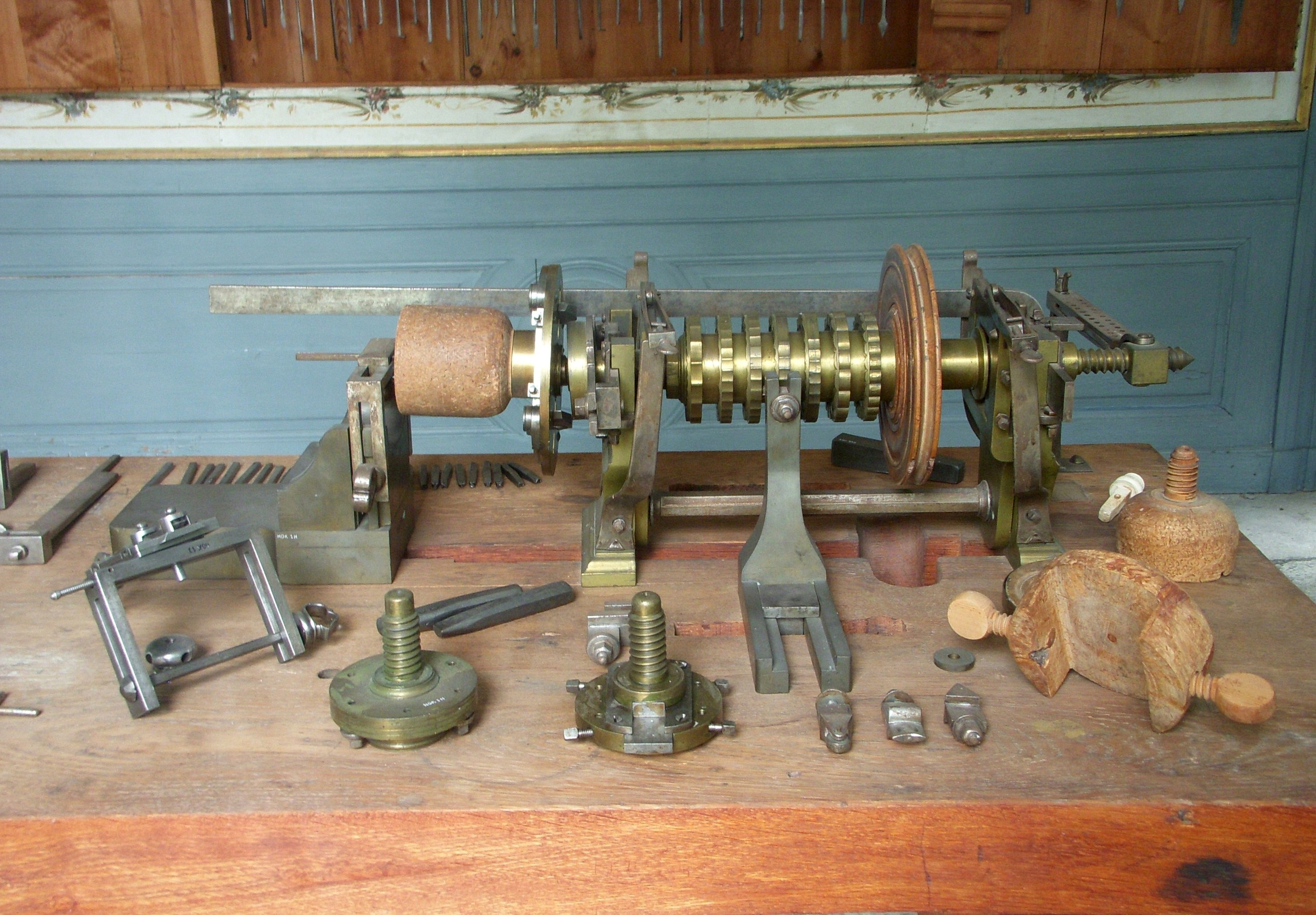
King Adolf Frederick's lathe in the "Billiard room".
