= Henrik von Cöllen =

- Born: Prussia
- Died: 12 May 1561; Savonia
- Resting place: Säminge churchyard
- Occupation: Master mason

Henrik von Cöllen (died probably 12 May 1561 in Savonia was a German master mason from Prussia, active in Sweden and Finland under King Gustav Vasa. He is best known as the leading master mason in the construction of Gripsholm Castle 1537–1545, and subsequently worked at Uppsala Castle and several fortresses in Finland under John III.

== Biography ==
Von Cöllen was subjected to surveillance by Peder Svenske, to ascertain his loyalty to the Swedish crown. In 1536, Gustav Vasa instructed the governor of Kalmar, Jöns Nilsson, who had requested a master builder for construction there, to contact von Cöllen, since he had presented himself as a master builder. That same year von Cöllen was summoned to Stockholm and Gripsholm. Between 1537 and 1545 he was continuously employed as foreman at Gripsholm. During this period he appears to have been held in high regard by the king, receiving among other things a plot of land in Strängnäs and increased remuneration.

In 1542 von Cöllen was rewarded with a grant of the city of Strängnäs with all annual taxes, royal and episcopal fines, and other levies.

Von Cöllen represented a conservative tradition in his field, shaped by late medieval German castle and fortress architecture. Gripsholm Castle, with its round cannon towers, was consequently already outdated when it was completed in 1545 – the same year construction began on Vadstena Castle, which would become Sweden's first Renaissance castle.

In 1545 von Cöllen was assigned to Uppsala, and his standing with the king began to decline. He was accused of being slow and incompetent. In 1551 he was replaced as master builder at Uppsala by Påvel Schütz, and thereafter received minor commissions in Strängnäs in 1556–1557.

In December 1557 Duke John summoned von Cöllen by letter to Finland, where he arrived in July 1558. Gustav Vasa formalised the transfer through a letter dated 4 July 1558. Von Cöllen thus entered the duke's service, working at Turku Castle in Finland, Nyenskans, Tavastehus and "Nyslott" (probably Olofsborg). Later that year he went to Olofsborg, where he directed demolition work to make way for a cannon tower in the front corner of the outer ward. In February 1559 he arrived at Tavastehus, where he directed work on the eastern round cannon tower without interruption until mid-October when the building season ended.

In 1569 the foundation was laid for a large new round tower at the south-eastern corner of the outer ward of Turku Castle, a tower that still exists and is one of the castle's most remarkable architectural monuments. In his work Ur Åbo slotts byggnadshistoria (1901), Jac Ahrenberg states that von Cöllen, although now a man of over sixty years of age, would have been called upon to assist with this construction. The claim cannot be verified in the king's printed building letters or in the castle accounts published by Ahrenberg, but is not for that reason implausible. Round towers were evidently von Cöllen's speciality, and he appears to have contributed to their introduction in Sweden. During the Vasa period they were built in two ways: either as low, bastion-like structures at the corners of outer works, or as taller corner towers projecting from the main castle building. The one at Turku belonged to the former type and was raised to a height of 13 ells in three unvaulted storeys, measured no less than 40 ells in diameter, and had walls approximately 10 ells thick. The roof was, and still is, a round tent roof without a lantern. Whether von Cöllen had returned to Sweden before possibly taking on this work is not known.

In the spring of 1560 von Cöllen was back at Olofsborg, where he directed the construction of the so-called Thick Tower at the outer ward and part of the surrounding curtain wall. Work continued into 1561, when von Cöllen's name suddenly disappears from the provisioning list compiled each week at the castle. His name is absent from 12 May 1561, and the researcher Antero Sinisalo has concluded from this that von Cöllen died on that date. He most likely received his final resting place at Säminge churchyard in Savonia.

As castle construction expanded in Sweden, von Cöllen proved to be an ageing medieval master mason who was unable to absorb the new influences in castle design coming from the continent. Gustav Vasa continued to disparage him in letters even during his time in Finland: when Viborg enquired in 1559 about repair works on the city wall and proposed von Cöllen as the responsible builder, the king replied that he was extremely elderly and hardly knew anything about more modern methods of construction.

The round cannon tower at Tavastehus Castle and the Thick Tower at Olofsborg – demolished in the 18th century – along with its curtain wall, are the only works in Finland that can with certainty be attributed to Henrik von Cöllen.

It has been suggested that Klaus von Cöllen, who served under Duke Charles and was ennobled in 1571, was Henrik von Cöllen's son.
