= Skytte =

Skytte is a surname. Notable people with the surname include:

- Bengt Skytte (1614–1683), Swedish courtier and diplomat
- Christina Anna Skytte (1643–1677), Swedish noblewoman
- Gustav Skytte (1637–1663), Swedish nobleman and pirate
- Johan Skytte (1577–1645), Swedish politician
- Karl Skytte (1908–1986), Danish politician
- Maria Skytte (died 1703), Swedish noblewoman
- Vendela Skytte (1608–1629), Swedish noblewoman, writer, and poet
