= Maria Skytte =

Swedish noble (d. 1703)

Maria Skytte af Duderhof (died 1703) was a Swedish Baroness and Countess known for her unconventional lifestyle.

She was the daughter of Baron Bengt Skytte and Christina Sparre and the niece of Vendela Skytte. Gustav Skytte and Christina Anna Skytte were her cousins. She was born sometime between 1636 and 1639. In 1664, she entered a long-term relationship with Master of Horse Count Gustaf Adam Banér (1631-1681), the same year Banér married Katarina Lillie (1643-1667). Skytte lived openly with Banér, which was formally a crime and caused a national scandal which made them both infamous. When she accompanied him openly during his journeys around the country, they were put on trial. Maria Skytte was accused of having disguised herself as a male, which was also a crime, when she secretly visited him. This has attracted attention in gender studies, and Maria Skytte and Greta Benzelia have been regarded as examples of females posing as males when wishing to hide their identities. Banér was forced to swear before the court hovrätten that he had not consummated his relationship with Skytte sexually, after which he was warned and exiled from the royal court. After Banér was widowed in 1667 Skytte married him. The marriage was first declared invalid and Banér was exiled from the country for six years, but the couple managed to have it legalized.

Maria Skytte was portrayed in the novel Fribytaren på Östersjön by Viktor Rydberg.
