= The Freebooter of the Baltic =

1857 novel by Viktor Rydberg

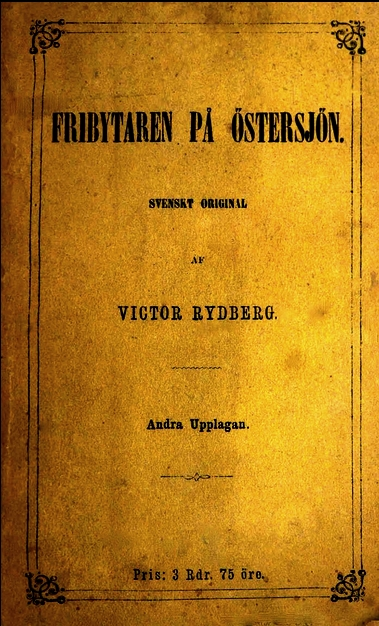
Title page of The Freebooter of the Baltic by Vikto Rydberg in Swedish

The Freebooter of the Baltic (Swedish: Fribytaren på Östersjön, 1857) is an early novel by the Swedish romantic novelist Viktor Rydberg. The adventure is set in 17th century Sweden and is a swashbuckling tale of piracy on the high seas, with political overtones. Several historical people are portrayed in the book, such as Bengt Skytte, Maria Skytte, Christina Anna Skytte and Gustav Skytte.

The novel was translated into English by Caroline L. Broomall in 1891.

== See also ==
- The Wind Is My Lover
