= Utö hus =

Historical Arnö Island manor

Coordinates: 59°28′22″N 17°13′55″E

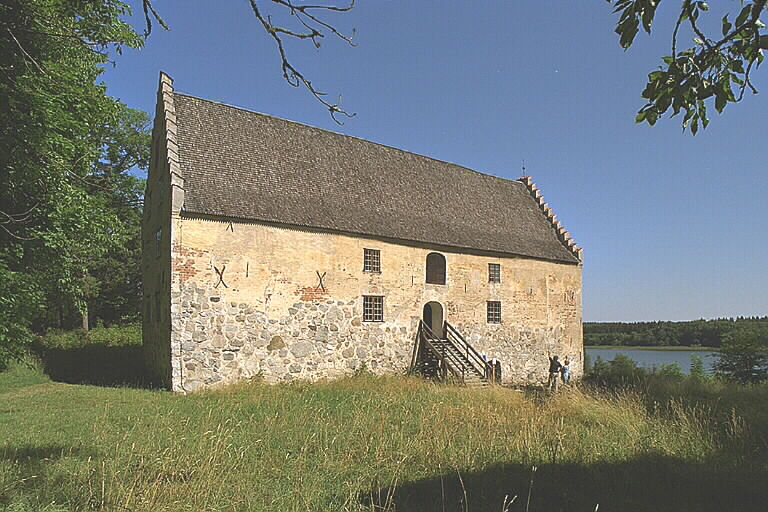
The Utö hus's main entrance

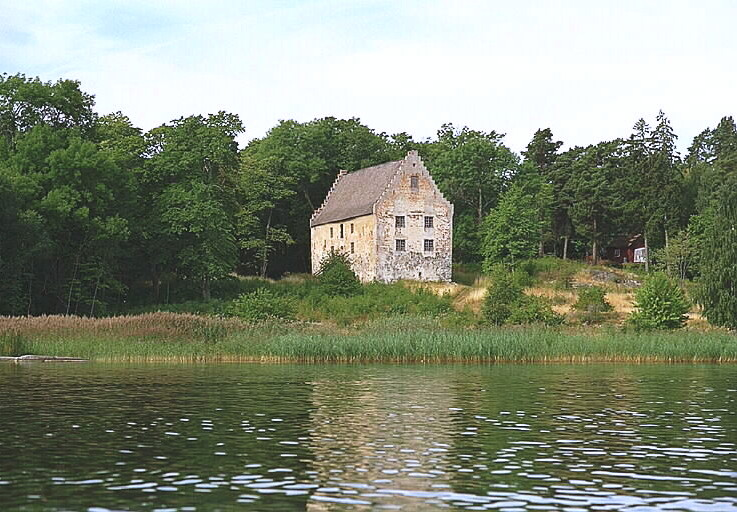
The Utö hus, photographed from the lake

Utö hus (sometimes Utöhus, literally in Swedish Utö house) is a medieval manor house on Arnö Island in Lake Mälaren in Uppland, Sweden.

== History ==
The manor is mentioned in written sources for the first time in beginning of the 15th century. At the time, it belonged to the Schack family. In the 1630s, the estate was merged with neighbouring estate of Grönsö Manor when the Chancellor of Uppsala University Johan Skytte (1577–1645) married Maria Näf.

The building was repaired circa 1740 and occasionally inhabited until the 1840s, when it was transformed into storage. In 1937, the building was donated to the Royal Swedish Academy of Letters, History and Antiquities by Alice von Ehrenheim.

The manor is a well-preserved, rectangular medieval manor house with crow-stepped gables. It consists of a cellar, two proper floors and two attic floors. The current division of rooms seems to date from the first half of the 17th century.
