= Thureth =

Old English poem

"Thureth" (Þūreð, [ˈθuːreð]) is the editorial name given to an eleven-line Old English poem preserved only on folio 31v of British Library MS Cotton Claudius A. III, at the beginning of the text known as 'Claudius Pontifical I'. The poem speaks with the voice of this pontifical or benedictional, interceding on behalf of Thureth who the poem tells us had the book ornamented. As Ronalds and Clunies Ross comment:

As far as we are aware, this is the only specifically identifiable book, aside from the generic book - or possibly Bible - of Riddle 24, that 'speaks' to us from the Anglo-Saxon period, albeit on another's behalf.

== Text ==
As edited in the Anglo-Saxon Poetic Records series, the poem reads:

Ic eom halgungboc; healde hine dryhten
þe me fægere þus frætewum belegde.
Þureð to þance þus het me wyrcean,
to loue and to wurðe, þam þe leoht gesceop.
Gemyndi is he mihta gehwylcre
þæs þe he on foldan gefremian mæg,
and him geþancie þeoda waldend
þæs þe he on gemynde madma manega
wyle gemearcian metode to lace;
and he sceal ece lean ealle findan
þæs þe he on foldan fremaþ to ryhte.

Translation:

I am a benedictional; may the Lord protect him
who thus decorated me beautifully with ornaments.
Thureth gratefully ordered me to be made in this way
in praise and in honour of Him who created the light.
He [= Thureth] is mindful of all the mighty works
which He [= God] is able to bring about on earth,
and the Ruler of Nations shall reward him,
because, mindful of many treasures,
he wishes to designate (me) as an offering to the Lord.
And he shall fully obtain eternal reward,
because he acts properly here on earth.

— Translated by Craig Ronalds and Margaret Clunies Ross

== Edition with Digital Facsimile ==
- Foys, Martin (ed.), Old English Poetry in Facsimile Project, 2019-; DOI: 10.21231/t6a2-jt11
