= Elitism =

Notion that elites deserve more influence

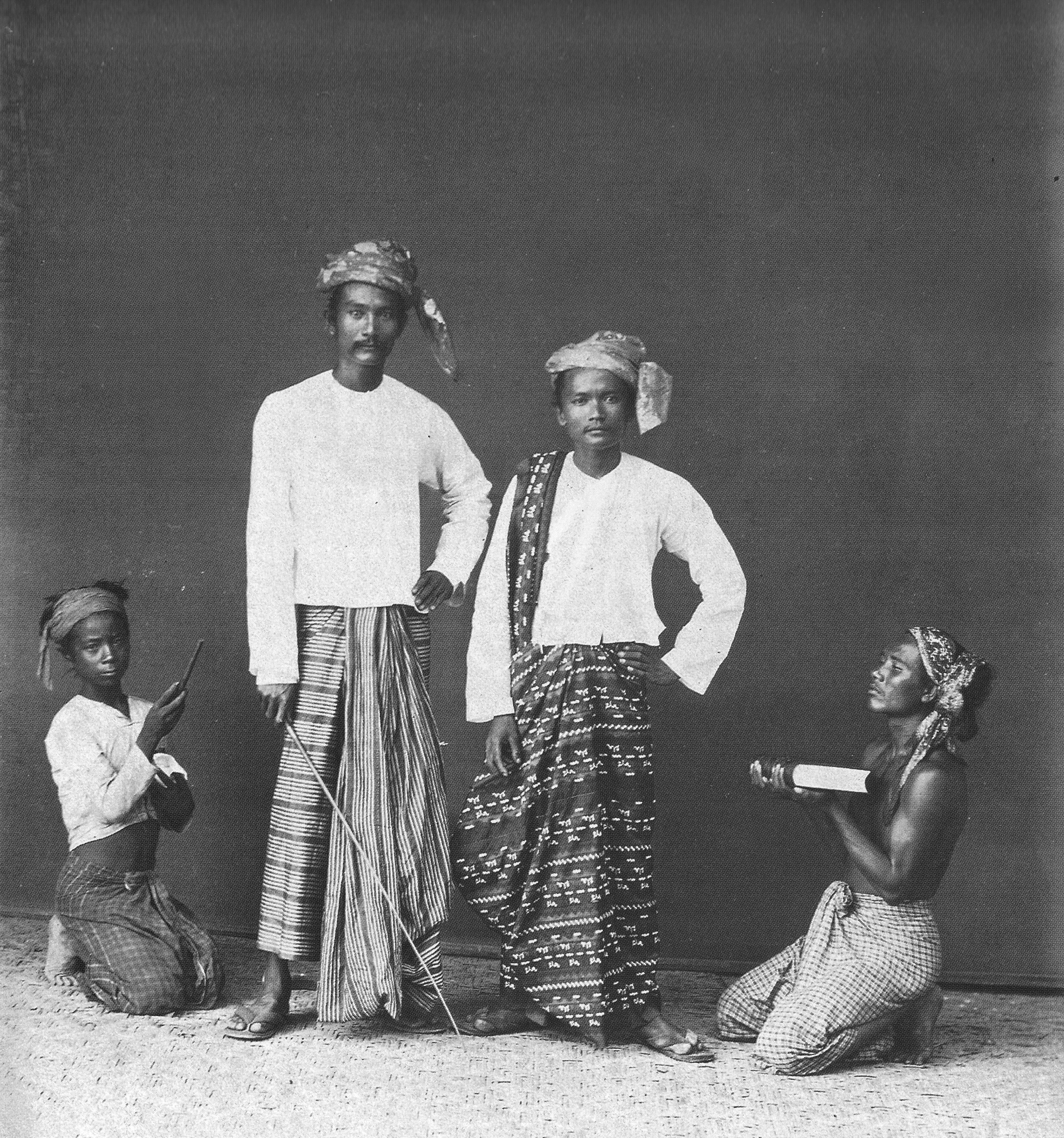
Burmese elites with their servants

Elitism is the notion that individuals who form an elite—a select group with desirable qualities such as intellect, wealth, power, fame, physical attractiveness, notability, special skills, experience, lineage—are more likely to be constructive to society and deserve greater influence or authority. The term elitism may be used to describe a situation in which power is concentrated in the hands of a limited number of people. Beliefs that are in opposition to elitism include egalitarianism, anti-intellectualism (against powerful institutions perceived to be controlled by elites), populism, and the political theory of pluralism.

Elite theory is the sociological or political science analysis of elite influence in society: elite theorists regard pluralism as a utopian ideal. Elitism is closely related to social class and what sociologists term "social stratification". In modern Western societies, social stratification is typically defined in terms of three distinct social classes: the upper class, the middle class, and the lower class.

== Characteristics ==
Elitists tend to favor social systems such as technocracy, combined with meritocracy and/or plutocracy, as opposed to political egalitarianism and populism. Elitists believe only a few "movers and shakers" truly change society, rather than the majority of people who only vote and elect the elites into power.

== See also ==
Quotations related to Elitism at Wikiquote

The dictionary definition of elitism at Wiktionary

- Aporophobia
- Bourgeoisie
- Caste
- Classism
- Collective narcissism
- Exclusivism
- Global elite
- International Debutante Ball
- Ivory tower
- Leet
- Narcissism
- Oligarchy
- Populism
- Rankism
- Sectarianism
- Self-righteousness
- Snobbery
- Social Darwinism
- Social Evolution
- Supremacism
