= Investigations into Germanic Mythology =

- Title page (1886)
- Author: Viktor Rydberg
- Original title: Undersökningar i germanisk mythologi
- Language: Swedish
- Subject: Germanic mythology
- Genre: Non-fiction
- Publication date: 1886, 1889
- Publication place: Sweden

Investigations into Germanic Mythology (Swedish: Undersökningar i germanisk mythologi) is a two-volume work by Viktor Rydberg, published in 1886 and 1889.

Henrik Schück wrote at the turn of the 20th century that he considered Rydberg the "last —and poetically most gifted —of the mythological school founded by Jacob Grimm and represented by such men as Adalbert Kuhn" which is "strongly synthetic" in its understanding of myth. Of this work, Jan de Vries said:

At a time, when one was firmly convinced that the Old Norse myths were a late product, Rydberg’s voice resounds. At that time, he swam against the current, but he clearly expressed what has since become an increasingly accepted conclusion: a large part of the myths of the Germanic tradition —and that is to say basically the Old Norse tradition—must be set back in a time when the undivided Proto-Indo-European people themselves created the vessel of their worldview in myths.

== Reception ==
There is no shortage of scholarly opinion and no consensus on Viktor Rydberg's works on Indo-European and Germanic mythology. Some scholars feel that his work is ingenious, while others feel the work is too speculative. One scholar expressed the opinion that "Rydberg's views" concerning resemblances of Thor and Indra were carried to extremes, therefore receiving "less recognition than they deserved." Others refute individual points of the work. Still others have commented on what they see as fundamental flaws in Rydberg's methodology. While many modern scholars object to any systematization of the mythology including the one imposed by Snorri Sturlusson, believing it artificial, John Lindow and Margaret Clunies Ross have recently supported a chronological systemization of the most important mythic episodes as inherent in the oral tradition underlying Eddic poetry. Rydberg, however, believed that most of the Germanic myths could be fit into such a chronology. H. R. Ellis Davidson has characterized this approach as "fundamentalist".

While Rydberg's ingenuity has been recognized by some, his work has most often been criticized for being too subjective. Yet, within his work, many find points on which they can agree. In the first comprehensive review of the work in English, in 1894, Rydberg's "brilliancy" and "great success" were recognized, alongside an acknowledgement that he sometimes "stumbles badly" in his effort to "reduce chaos to order." In 1976, German-language scholar Peter-Hans Naumann published the first evaluation of the full range of Viktor Rydberg's mythological writings.

One of Rydberg's mythological theories is that of a vast World Mill which rotates the heavens, which he believed was an integral part of Old Norse mythic cosmology. The controversial 1969 work Hamlet's Mill by Giorgio de Santillana and Hertha von Dechend utilizes this theory.

The British literary researcher Brian Johnston has suggested that Henrik Ibsen's play The Master Builder (1892) is rich in references to both Norse mythology and Zoroastrianism, and that Rydberg's book, which presents the different Indo-European religions as being closely connected, may have been a key source for Ibsen.

In 1997, William H. Swatos, Jr. and Loftur Reimar Gissurarson reference Rydberg's explanation of draugur ('mound-dwellers') in their work, Icelandic Spiritualism, while Marvin Taylor cites Rydberg’s definition of the phrase, “dómr um dauðan hvern,” as predating that of a more contemporary writer cited by the author. Both the comprehensive multi-volume Kommentar zu den Liedern der Edda, and Carol Clover's article "Hárbardsljóð as Generic Farce", name Rydberg as one of the early writers who believed the ferryman Harbard of the Eddic poem Hárbardsljóð to be Loki, rather than Odin, although both sources note that this theory has not been accepted by scholars since the late 19th century. The Kommentar states: "Because there is no explicit revelation in the poem Hárbardsljóð concerning the identity of the title figure, Harbard, who is concealed under this name remained disputed until the end of the 19th century. In the third volume of the same work, Rydberg's theory regarding the World Mill is discussed in relationship to the eddic poem Grottosöngr. He has also been mentioned as one of several writers who proposed analogs for Askr and Embla from comparative mythology, and who sought Indo-Iranian analogs for the Eddic Poem, Völuspá.

In 2004, Swedish Doktorand (PhD student) Anna Lindén reviewed the full two-volume work on mythology, concluding in part that it was not more widely received because it was not fully available in one of the three international languages of scholarship: English, German or French. A German translation was being prepared in 1889 by literary historian, Phillip B. Schweitzer, who died in a skiing accident shortly thereafter. A French translation planned by a group of scholars in Lund in 1891 was never completely realized. Rydberg himself knew that his mythology would be regarded as "folly" to the German philologists, who, as adherents to the school of nature-mythology, regarded him as a heretic, in regard to his methods and results.

As Fredrik Gadde explained,

“the book was reviewed by several German scholars, who all took up a more or less disparaging attitude towards Rydberg’s methods of investigation and his results.”

Those contemporary scholars "although they speak with high praise of the author's learning, his thorough insight, his ability occasionally to throw light upon intricate problems by means of ingenious suggestions" were especially critical of what they see as Rydberg’s “hazardous etymologies, his identification of different mythical figures without sufficient grounds, his mixing up of heroic saga and myth, and, above all, his bent for remodelling myths in order to make them fit into a system which (they say) never existed.”

== Editions ==
- 1886, Undersökningar i germanisk mythologi, första delen, (Investigations into Germanic Mythology, Volume I).
  - Teutonic Mythology translated by Rasmus B. Anderson 1889
- 1889, Undersökningar i germanisk mythologi, andre delen.
  - Viktor Rydberg's Investigations into Germanic Mythology, Volume 2, Parts 1 & 2, translated by William P. Reaves, 2004-2007.

== See also ==
- Deutsche Mythologie
- Hamlet's Mill
