= Gustav Skytte =

Swedish pirate (1637–1663)

Gustav Adolf Skytte af Duderhoff
- Born: 1637; Småland, Sweden
- Died: 21 April 1663 (aged 25–26); Jönköping, Sweden
- Piratical career
- Type: Pirate
- Years active: 1657–1663
- Base of operations: Baltic Sea

Gustav Adolf Skytte af Duderhof (1637 – 21 April 1663) was a Swedish nobleman. He became a pirate and plundered ships in the Baltic Sea in the years 1657 to 1662.

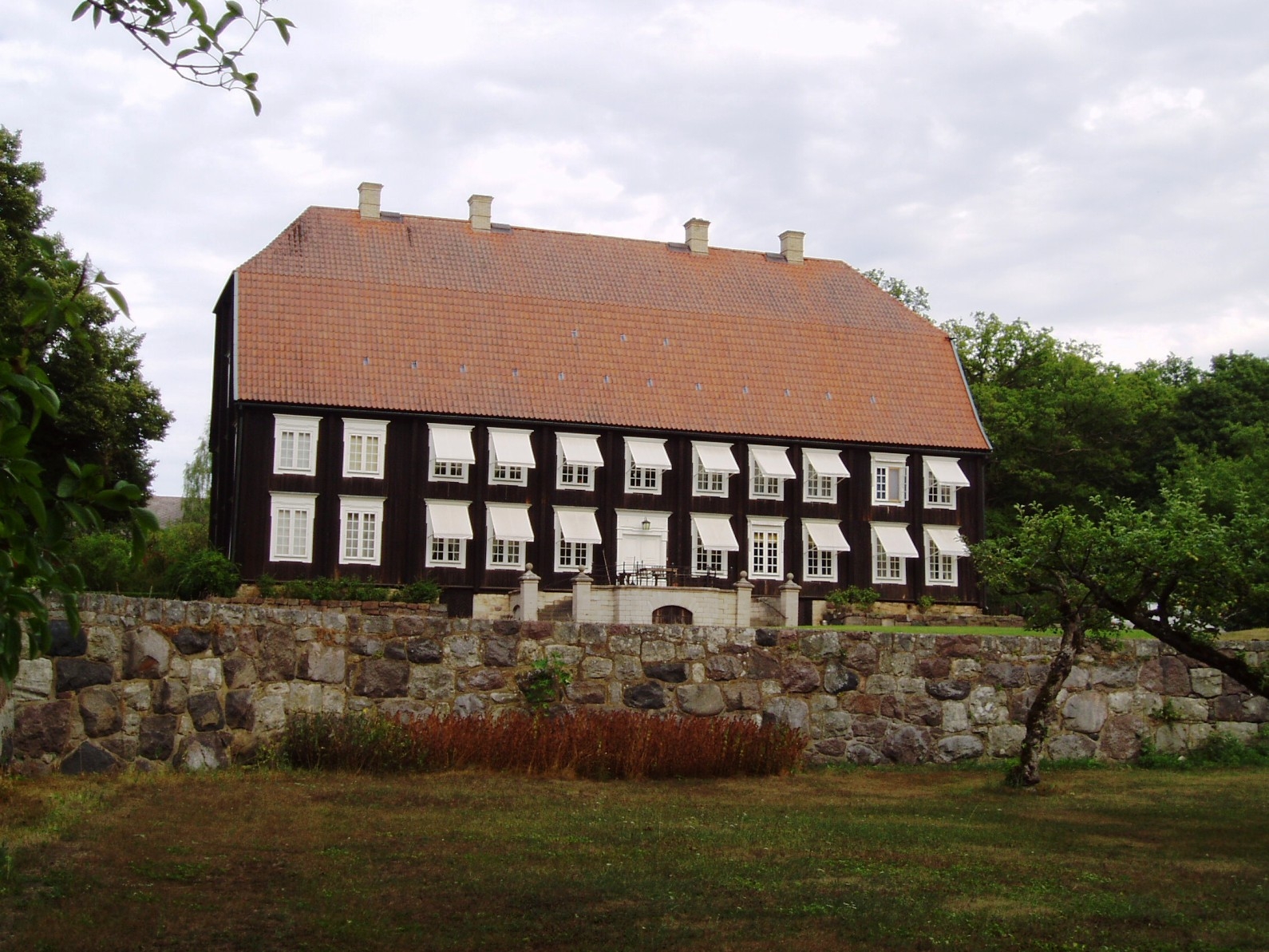
Strömsrum Manor in Mönsterås

== Biography ==
Skytte was born at Strömsrum Manor in the parish of Ålems at Mönsterås in Kalmar County, Sweden. His parents were Anna Bielkenstjerna (c. 1617–1663) and Jacob Skytte af Duderhof (1616–1654) who served as governor of Östergötland during 1645–1650. He was the grandson of Swedish governor, Johan Skytte (1577–1645) and nephew of the salonist and poet Vendela Skytte (1608–1629).

In 1657, Skytte hired a Dutch ship together with some of his friends. Out on the sea, the noblemen murdered the captain and took over the ship, which they used as a pirate ship, attacking ships in the Baltic Sea. One of his colleagues was his brother-in-law Gustaf Drake (1634–1684) the husband of his sister Christina Anna Skytte (1643–1677). They pursued this secret business from a base in Blekinge, Sweden.

In 1661, he, and other pirates, made a successful raid on a Dutch Bojort off the coast of Bornholm.

In 1659, Gustav Skytte married Brita Margareta Hamilton, daughter of Colonel Hugo Hamilton (c.1600–1678). In 1662, his pirate activity was exposed. Christina Anna and Gustaf Drake fled the country, but Gustav Skytte was arrested and put on trial. He was convicted of piracy and was executed at Jönköping in 1663.

Gustav Skytte was featured by Viktor Rydberg (1828–1895) in the 1857 novel The Freebooter of the Baltic (Fribytaren på Östersjön Stockholm: Albert Bonniers förlag).

== See also ==
- Lars Gathenhielm

== Other sources ==
- "Anteckningar om svenska qvinnor". Project Runeberg website (in Swedish). 1864.
- Gustaf Elgenstierna (1925–36). Den introducerade svenska adelns ättartavlor med tillägg och rättelser (in Swedish).
