= Viktor Rydberg =

Swedish novelist (1828–1895)

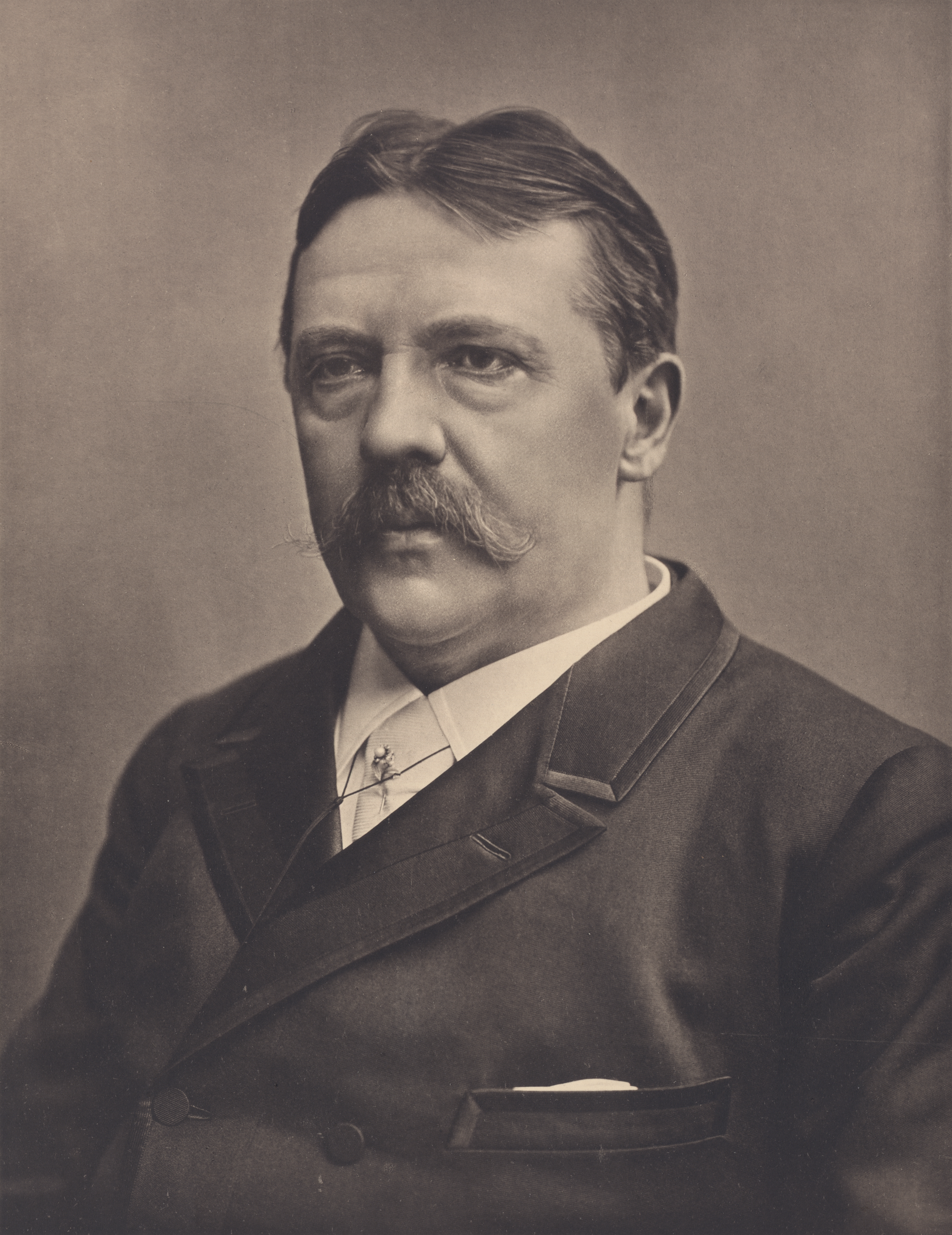
- Rydberg, c. 1895
- Born: Abraham Viktor Rydberg; 18 December 1828; Jönköping, Sweden
- Died: 21 September 1895 (aged 66); Djursholm, Stockholm county, Sweden
- Occupations: Author, journalist, novelist, translator and poet
- Spouse: Susen Hasselblad
- Relatives: Johann Rydberg (father), Hedvig Düker (mother)
- Writing career
- Period: Victorian, Oscarian
- Genre: Romance
- Subjects: Mythology, Religion
- Notable works: Singoalla, Undersökningar i Germanisk Mythologi I-II, Fädernas Gudasaga

Abraham Viktor Rydberg (Swedish pronunciation: [ˈɑ̂ːbraham ˈvɪ̌kːtɔr ˈrŷːdbærj]; 18 December 1828 – 21 September 1895) was a Swedish writer and a member of the Swedish Academy, 1877–1895. "Primarily a classical idealist", Viktor Rydberg has been described as "Sweden's last Romantic" and by 1859 was "generally regarded in the first rank of Swedish novelists."

== Biography ==
Viktor Rydberg was of humble parentage. He was the son of a soldier turned prison guard, Johan Rydberg, and a midwife, Hedvig Düker. Viktor Rydberg had two brothers and three sisters. In 1834 his mother died during a cholera epidemic. Her death broke the spirit of his father, who yielded to hypochondria and alcoholism, contributing towards his loss of employment and the family's apartment, forcing authorities to board young Viktor out to a series of foster homes, one of which burnt down, further traumatizing the youth. From 1838 to 1847, Rydberg attended grammar school, and studied law at the University of Lund from 1851 to 1852. Due to financial reasons, his university studies ended after one year without a degree. Afterward, he took a job as a private tutor.

Despite his economic status, Rydberg was recognized for his talents. One biographer notes that: "He had a hard struggle to satisfy the thirst for learning which was a leading passion of his life, but he finally attained distinction in several fields of scholarship." In 1855, he was offered work at the Göteborgs Handels- och Sjöfartstidning, a newspaper in Gothenburg, where he remained employed for more than 20 years. It was during this time that his first novels saw print. He soon became a central figure of late Romanticism in Sweden, and Sweden's most famous living author.

Throughout his adult life, Rydberg was active in politics. In 1859, he wrote a pamphlet on national defense, which inspired the "Sharpshooter's movement", a voluntary militia of some political importance during the 1860s. In 1870, he took a controversial pro-German stance during the Franco-Prussian War. Representing the traditional economic system of Sweden, from 1870 to 1872, Rydberg was a member of the Swedish Parliament as a supporter of the Lantmanna Party. Having been a supporter of the Jewish cause since his youth, it was MP Viktor Rydberg who gave the keynote speech in the parliamentary debate to enact a law granting all non-Lutherans full civil rights. He worked diligently for working-class people and in 1906 his works on the labor question in both prose and poetry were regarded as part of the "treasury of this class." He also advocated language reform, purging foreign words from the Swedish language, particularly those of German origin. Around this time, he advocated a more Germanic spelling of his own name: Viktor, as opposed to Victor.

Throughout his life and career, Rydberg coined several Swedish words; many, such as gudasaga for the foreign mythologi, are still in use today. In 1884, he refused to support anarchist writer August Strindberg in his blasphemy case. As a juror in an 1888 trial of socialist leader Hjalmar Branting, Rydberg voted to send him to jail for blasphemy. They never spoke to one another again. His apprehension of unregulated capitalism at the dawn of the industrial age is most fully expressed in his acclaimed poem Den nya Grottesången (The New Grotti Song) in which he delivered a fierce attack on the miserable working conditions in factories of the era, using the mill of Grottasöngr as his literary backdrop.

For his lifetime of literary achievement, Rydberg received an honorary doctorate from the University of Uppsala in 1877 and was elected a member of the Swedish Academy the same year. He served from 1883 as teacher, from 1884 as professor, of the History of Culture at Stockholms högskola, now Stockholm University, and from 1889 as the first holder of the J. A. Berg Chair of the History and Theory of Art there. In 1889, he was also elected a member of the Royal Swedish Academy of Sciences.

Rydberg died at the age of 66 on 21 September 1895 due to complications from diabetes and arteriosclerosis. Rydberg's passing was reported as far away as the United States of America, where the New York Times published an obituary titled: "Death of Prof. A.V. Rydberg, Career and Remarkable works of one of Sweden's Leading Men." A national day of mourning ensued all over Sweden. Today, his grave is a national monument. Many of his works have been translated and remain in print. His works are widely read in schools throughout Sweden, and his poem "Tomten" ("Santa" or "The Gnome") is a Christmas favorite, as well as the lyrics for Gläns över sjö och strand. A group of three charter high schools (Gymnasium) and one middle school in Stockholm, as well as a street in Göteborg, a student dormitory, and other buildings carry his name. He is still listed in many English language encyclopedias as an individual entry.

Since the late 1920s, scholars and critics have speculated about Rydberg's private life and sexual orientation. Referring to a failed engagement, Judith Moffett writes:

We can construct a story of backdoor illicit liaisons and front door respectability from these fragments and others— Rydberg would hardly be the first, if it were true— but he never spoke openly about his private life at any time, and our best guess would still be guesswork.

Svanberg (1928) and Stolpe (1978) suggested that Rydberg had a homosexual orientation, based on their interpretations of Rydberg's published works. Moffett (2001) endorsed Stolpe's theory, speculating that Rydberg's sexual orientation was the result of the early loss of his mother, concluding that Rydberg was homosexual but celibate. In her opinion, Rydberg found all sexual expression "despicable, impossible, or, at best, delicious but lethal." Sven Delblanc (1983) argued that the novel Singoalla "reflected homosexual desires and impulses in Rydberg himself", and that the protagonist's slaying of his unacknowledged son Sorgborn ['child of sorrow'] was a "masked representation of homosexual intercourse." Bäckmann (2004) disputed this theory noting that there is "no textual evidence" to support this "empathetic reading" of Rydberg's biography.

== Publications ==
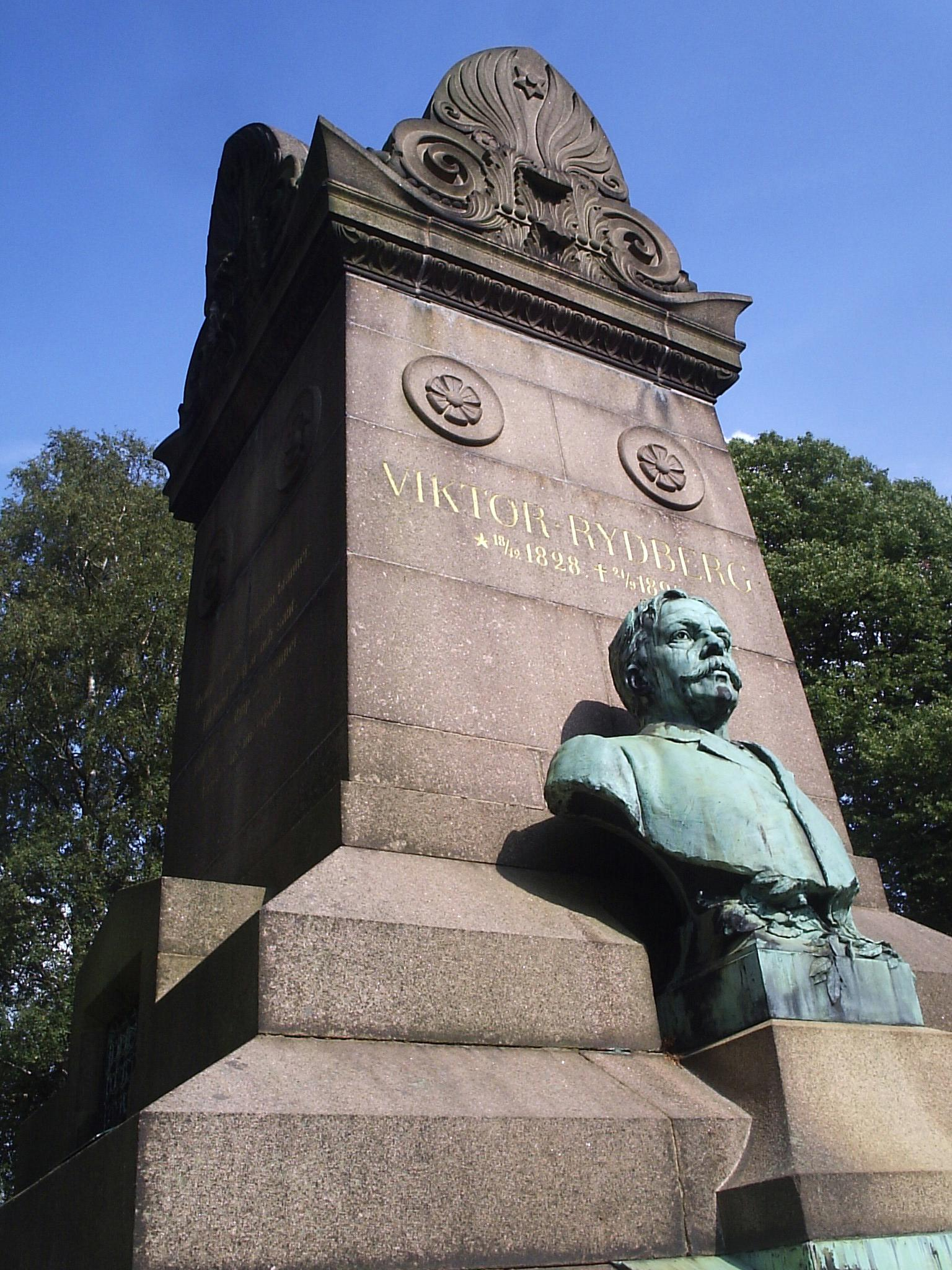
Viktor Rydberg's grave in Gothenburg.

In 1857, Rydberg's first novel, Fribytaren på Östersjön (The Freebooter of the Baltic; 1857), a historical romance set in the 17th century, incorporating themes of piracy, witchcraft and nautical excursions, was published.

This was soon followed by his first major success, and one of his most popular novels, Singoalla (1858), a "romantic story out of the Middle Ages, permeated with a poetic nature-mysticism, about the tragic love between a knight and a gypsy girl." Rydberg rewrote the book throughout his life. The fourth and final edition of 1894, concludes with Erland dying as a hermit monk. The story has been made into a film twice, and today, a popular brand of cookie takes its name from the book's main character: Singoalla. A review of the first English translation of the work in the Saga-Book of the Viking Club, Vol. 4, Part 1, 1904–5, noting that the book "has already been translated into most of the languages of continental Europe", remarks that "Singoalla is a novel occupying a pre-eminent place among Rydberg's prose writings."

In 1859, Rydberg's most ambitious novel, and his last one for thirty years, was published under the title Den siste Atenaren (The Last Athenian). This, his best-known novel, offers a contrast between "Rydberg's admiration for classical antiquity and his critical attitude to dogmatic Christianity." This struggle is set in Athens, in the time of the last pagan emperor, Julian the Apostate, during the transition from Platonic paganism to Christianity. The novel advocates a philosophy founded on the noblest elements of both ideologies. William Widgery Thomas, Jr. said that "at scarcely thirty years of age" Rydberg was "already acknowledged to be the foremost living prose writer of Scandinavia."

In 1862 he wrote and published Bibelns lära om Kristus (The Bible's Doctrine concerning Christ), a work of contemporary religious criticism, which was hugely successful. Introducing modern Biblical criticism to Scandinavia, he used the New Testament itself to deny the divinity of Christ. "At a conference of the Swedish church in 1865, Mr. Rydberg ...and he pleaded his cause with so much eloquence as to make a favorable impression upon his most eminent official opponents. The agitation which he called forth made his name known throughout Sweden, and in 1870 he was elected a member of parliament, where he boldly advocated democratic principles." The long-term effects of the book would be the weakening of the authority of the Church over the educated classes of Scandinavia. August Strindberg "acknowledged the liberating influence of Rydberg's Bibelns lära om Kristus (The Bible's Doctrine Concerning Christ, 1862) on his generation (like David Friedrich Strauss and Ernst Renan)." He taught freedom of individual conscience. It was this that inspired him in the fight against the state church. Predictably, this book attracted the ire of the orthodox religious establishment and is generally credited for Rydberg's exclusion from the Swedish Academy until as late as 1877. From 1865 to 1868, Rydberg suffered a severe bout of depression caused by the theological struggle and a broken engagement in 1865.

Rydberg's next work, Medeltidens Magi (The Magic of the Middle Ages) 1865 is an exposition of the magical practices and beliefs of the Medieval period. According to Rydberg, the contemporary Church was still driven by the ideology of the Dark Ages, and its dualistic notions of good and evil, represented by God and the Devil, Heaven and Hell, contributed towards the horror of the witch-hunts in Europe and America in the recent past. From this point forward, Rydberg was economically successful as a writer.

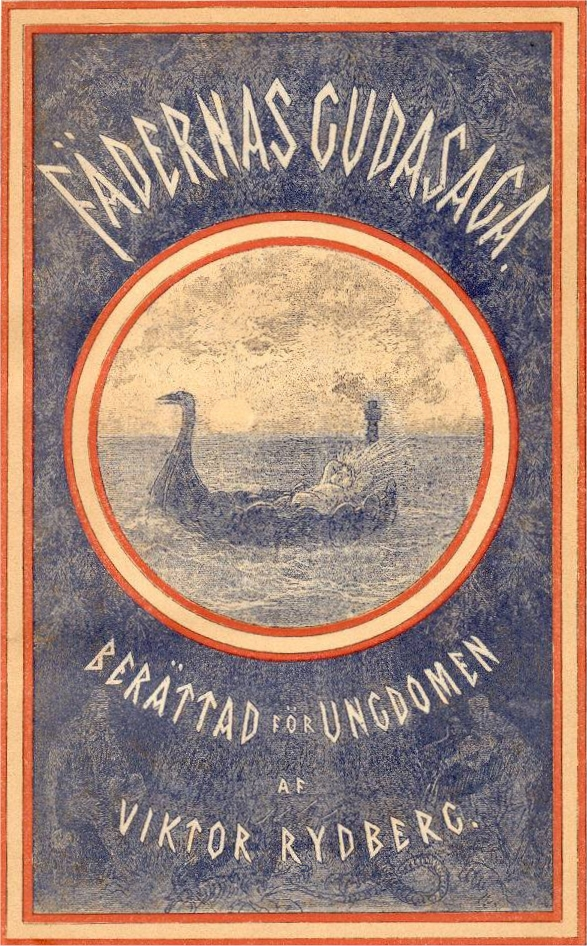
cover to Fädernas gudasaga

"Lille Viggs äventyr på julafton" ("Little Vigg's Adventures on Christmas Eve", 1871) is a short Christmas tale for all ages, originally written for a newspaper, but later widely printed. It has since become a Christmas classic in Sweden.

After a long journey in Italy in 1874, Rydberg published Romerska sägner om apostlarna Petrus och Paulus (Roman Legends concerning the Apostles Peter and Paul 1874) and Romerska Dagar (Roman Days 1877), a series of essays on Italian culture, history and archaeology; The journey is said to have strengthened Rydberg's creative power, as he now produced some of "the finest philosophical lyrics in Swedish literature". "His poems are not numerous, but their masterly form and wealth of thought give them rank among the best poetry in Swedish literature." Charles Wharton Stork remarks: "In the originality and forcefulness of his imagery Rydberg marks an important advance in Swedish poetry;" "there is a manliness in Rydberg's voice which makes the notes carry. His ideas are not the shadows of others, they are his by strong conviction."

Other important works include his translation of Goethe's Faust (1876) and the historical novel Vapensmeden (The Armorer, 1891), his first novel in three decades. Set during the Reformation, the novel depicts the struggle between Lutheran Protestantism and Roman Catholicism. In it, Rydberg "still fought fanaticism and dogmatism, and his ideal was still humanity and liberty."

Between 1886 and 1889, his literary work was focused on Norse and broader Germanic mythology. "Rydberg had already begun, in the guise of fiction, to devote himself to cultural history, and this now continued in the form of a series of scientific investigations. These dealt first and foremost with religion and mythology." He published several works in the field including two articles on the origins of the Poetic Edda poem Völuspá, in which he debated the authenticity of the poem with Norwegian scholar Sophus Bugge, who held that the poem was based on Classical and Biblical sources. An article by George Stephens in The Antiquary August 1881, describes Rydberg's response:

"Against this last theory, the Swedish savant, Dr. Viktor Rydberg, of Gotenburg, has written a brilliant paper in the two first numbers of Nordisk Tidskrift for 1881. It is not too much to say, that a more crushing and masterly reply was never penned.

A century later, Old Norse scholar Ursula Dronke characterizes this work similarly:

"... over one hundred pages (as against Bang's twenty-three!) of marvellously intelligent, masterly criticism of the errors, imprecise thinking and failure of scholarly imagination that underlay Bang's claim."

Even Sophus Bugge acknowledged that Rydberg won the argument, ushering in the modern age of Eddic scholarship by firmly vanquishing the nature-school of mythology. The result of his own investigations in prose was titled Segerssvärdet 1882, (The Sword of Victory), followed by two volumes of mythic studies titled Undersökningar i germanisk mythologi, första delen, 1886 (Investigations into Germanic Mythology, Volume 1); and Undersökningar i germanisk mythologi, andre delen, (Investigations into Germanic Mythology, Volume 2) 1889 as well as a children's version of Norse mythology in 1887 titled Fädernas gudasaga (Our Fathers' Godsaga). In a letter to Rydberg, after receiving the first volume of his mythological research, Bugge stated: "As I have read my heart has warmed more and more. ...Forgive these words from a man who before such a magnificent and in many respects remarkable work is well aware that he is nothing but a philologist."

Henrik Schück wrote at the turn of the 20th century that he considered Rydberg the "last —and poetically most gifted —of the mythological school founded by Jacob Grimm and represented by such men as Adalbert Kuhn" which is "strongly synthetic" in its understanding of myth. Of this work, Jan de Vries said:

"At a time, when one was firmly convinced that the Old Norse myths were a late product, Rydberg's voice resounds. At that time, he swam against the stream, but he clearly expressed that which has become an ever stronger certainty today: a large part of the myths of the Germanic tradition —and that is to say basically the Old Norse tradition—must be set back in a time when the undivided Proto-Indo-European people themselves created the vessel of their worldview in myths."

During the 1880s, Rydberg also published two studies of runic inscriptions. His acceptance speech into the Swedish Academy, titled "Om Hjeltesagan å Rökstenen" (translated as "Concerning the Heroic-Saga on the Rök runestone") was published in English translation, with an introduction by Swedish Scholar Ola Östin, in its entirety in The Runestone Journal 1, 2007, a publication of the Asatru Folk Assembly.

Rydberg's final publication, an essay titled Den hvita rasens framtid, "The Future of the White Race", was published posthumously as an introduction to the Swedish edition of Benjamin Kidd's Social Evolution. Noting that "Rydberg's conception of race is not equivalent with the modern term; the meaning he gives the word is in fact more cultural than biological, ...he includes Jews, Muslims, Hindus, Buddhists living in Asia, America and to some extent Africa in this expression." Swedish scholar Anna Lindén says "what he actually criticizes is a phenomenon within Europe, not on other continents", continuing,

"The Swedish author is, unlike Kidd, not a Social Darwinist and far more pessimistic about the European future than the Irishman. A common feature is, however, that both of them view religion and ethics as most important for the survival of a "race". "Evolution is rightly said to be one of the most typical theme in 19th century Europe, but parallel to this optimism in the second half of the century there was a widespread, nearly apocalyptic, anxiety for the degeneration of the population caused by exceptional fast development. Rydberg shared this anxiety: he was very critical to industrialism and unhealthy milieu of the big European metropolises, ...in combination with low nativity this was a dangerous threat to Europe, especially compared to the steadily growing, physically as well as morally sound population in China and the Far East. ...This lack of morals will in the long run ruin the ecological system as well as the poor people on our continent."

In contrast to Kidd's optimistic Darwinism (all'ottimismo darwiniano di Kidd), Rydberg foresaw the possibility of European culture being overcome by the more industrious and more prolific Chinese nation. (Note: "In dissenso rispetto all'ottimismo darwiniano di Kidd, Rydberg tratteggiava il crollo della cultura europea per opera della nazione cinese.") (Note: "The racial focus originated in the nineteenth-century tradition with anthropologists such as Anders Retzius promoting superior Nordic virtues, while Victor Rydberg wrote about the potential downfall of the white race and the threat of the Chinese.") In this essay,

"Rydberg's belief in a swift, negative transformation ... is not initially eugenic or biological; instead he advocates moral rearmament." "Rydberg envisioned European culture being overthrown by the Chinese. He predicted that the downfall would come in the very near future and would come about because of moral degeneration, demographic conditions, and the ensuing defects in the population."

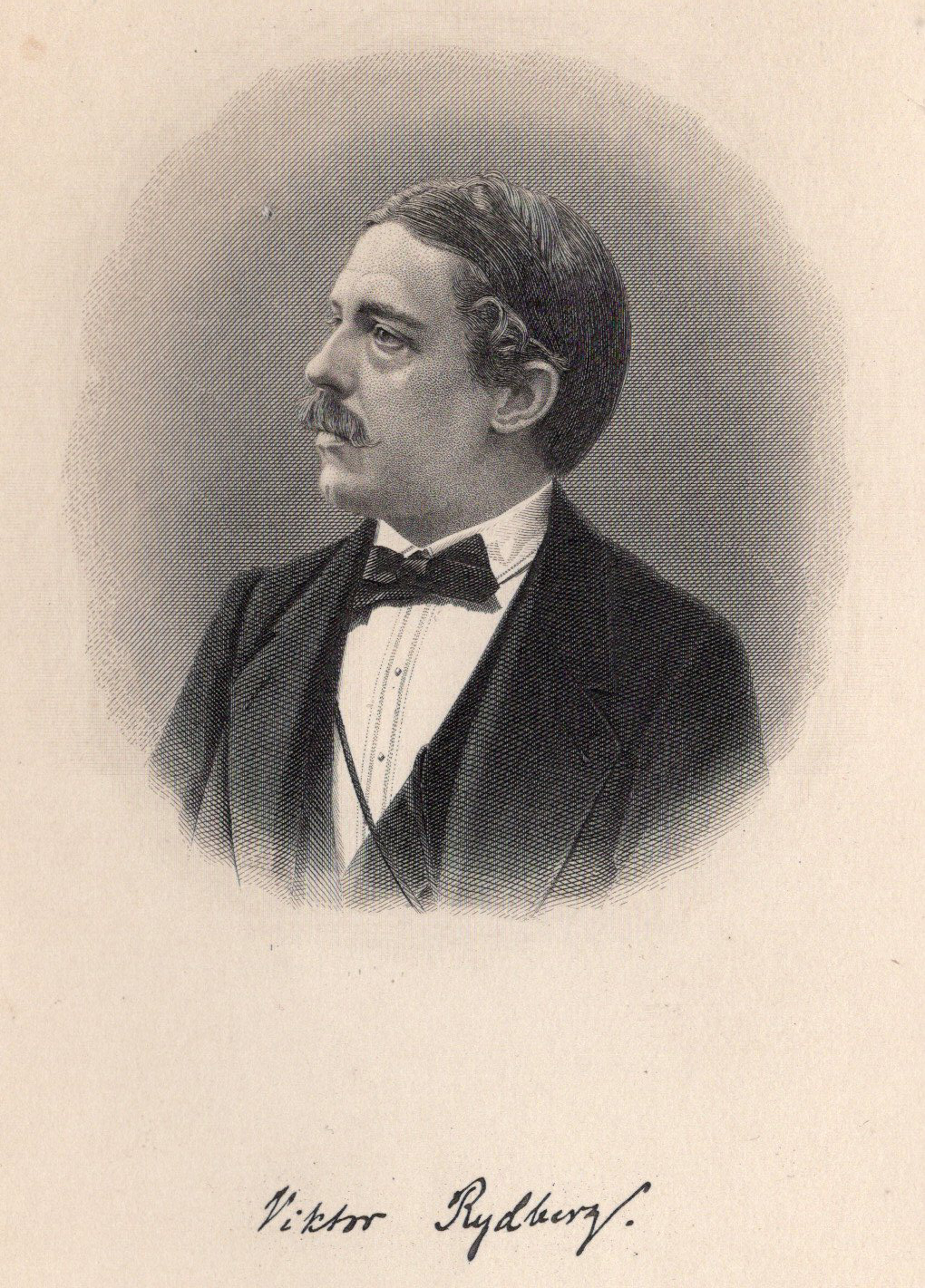
Viktor Rydberg portrait with signature

=== Mythological works ===
There is no shortage of scholarly opinion and no consensus on Viktor Rydberg's works on Indo-European and Germanic mythology. Some scholars feel that his work is ingenious, (Note: Commenting on specifics of Rydberg's comparative mythology, the Dutch scholar Jan de Vries calls him "sagacious." De Vries, writing in The Problem of Loki, 1933, said: The resemblance between Loki and Prometheus, which indeed cannot be denied, was mostly considered to be a proof of his character as a fire-god, even going back to the Aryan period. The sagacious Swedish scholar V. Rydberg argued in the same way, considering him only more particularly to be connected with the heavenly fire, the lightning; this seems to be shown by the etymological meaning of the names Byleistr and Farbauti both parents of Loki.") while others feel the work is too speculative. One scholar expressed the opinion that "Rydberg's views" concerning resemblances of Thor and Indra were carried to extremes, therefore receiving "less recognition than they deserved," while another says "Rydberg correctly establishes, like many before and after him, the similarities with the myth of Thor and the Midgard serpent" with that of Indra and the dragon Vrtra. Others contest individual points of the work. (Note: Marlene Ciklamini observed in 1962, "Since Suttungr is unanimously declared to be the possessor of the poetic mead, it is difficult to agree with Rydberg that Hávamál 140 represents Bölþorn's son as the owner. His hypothesis is based on a misinterpretation of the stanza, since Háv. 140 represents the boast of a god who deprived his enemies of the exclusive right to magic and the ownership of the mead.... Rydberg's suggestion that Mímir is Bölþorn's son is not substantiated by any source.") While some scholars have praised Rydberg's method, still others have commented on what they see as fundamental flaws in his methodology, objecting to any systematization of the mythology including the one imposed by Snorri Sturlusson, believing it artificial. However, John Lindow and Margaret Clunies Ross have recently supported a chronological systemization of the most important mythic episodes as inherent in the oral tradition underlying Eddic poetry. Rydberg believed that most of the Germanic myths were part of a chronological epic, an approach that H. R. Ellis Davidson characterized as arising "from an assumption that the mythology was once complete and rational."

While Rydberg's ingenuity has been recognized by some, (Note: Mary E. Litchfield wrote: "Rydberg's researches have made it possible, for the first time, for one to form a definite conception of the cosmology of the mythology, and also because it clears away many inconsistencies that have long clung to it.") his work has most often been criticized for being too subjective. Yet, within his work, many find points on which they can agree. (Note: "Victor Rydberg suggested that Siritha is Freyja herself and that Ottar is identical with same as Svipdagr, who appears as Menglöd's beloved in Fjölsvinnsmál. Rydberg's intentions in his investigations of Germanic mythology were to co-ordinate the myths and mythical fragments into coherent short stories. Not for a moment did he hesitate to make subjective interpretations of the episodes, based more on his imagination and poetical skills than on facts. His explication of the Siritha-episode is an example of his approach, and yet he probably was right when he identified Siritha with Freyja.") In the first comprehensive review of the work in English, Rydberg's "brilliancy" and "great success" were recognized, alongside an acknowledgement that he sometimes "stumbles badly" in his effort to "reduce chaos to order." (Note: In the introduction to the first English translation of Danish historian Saxo Grammaticus' Gesta Danorum by Oliver Elton, Frederick York Powell wrote in 1894: No one has commented upon Saxo's mythology with such brilliancy, such minute consideration, and such success as the Swedish scholar, Victor Rydberg. More than occasionally he is over-ingenious and over-anxious to reduce chaos to order; sometimes he almost loses his faithful reader in the maze he treads so easily and confidently, and sometimes he stumbles badly. But he has placed the whole subject on a fresh footing, and much that is to follow will be drawn from his "Teutonic Mythology", adding "The skeleton-key of identification, used even as ably as Dr. Rydberg uses it, will not pick every mythologic lock, though it undoubtedly has opened many hitherto closed.") In 1976, German-language scholar Peter-Hans Naumann published the first evaluation of the full range of Viktor Rydberg's mythological writings. In 2004, Swedish doktorand (PhD student) Anna Lindén reviewed the full two-volume work on mythology, concluding in part that it was not more widely received because it was not fully available in one of the three international languages of scholarship: English, German or French.

At the time of its publication, the German school of Nature mythology dominated the field, and contemporary scholars took a dim view of comparative mythology, which would come to flourish in the 20th century. Commenting on Rydberg's mythological work in 1902, Dutch Professor, P.D. Chantepie de la Saussaye, remarks:

"The comparative school has, even at the present time, some firm adherents. Among these may be reckoned the Swede, V. Rydberg, who shows great learning in the combination of various aspects of mythical narratives and according to whom even the cosmogonic myths are to be classed among the original possessions of the primitive Indo-European period. Such attempts, however, —of which this single example will suffice—lie outside of the current of modern development."

As Fredrik Gadde has explained, it was in this context, that

"the book was reviewed by several German scholars, who all took up a more or less disparaging attitude towards Rydberg's methods of investigation and his results. Although they speak with high praise of the author's learning, his thorough insight, his ability to occasionally throw light upon intricate problems by means of ingenious suggestions, they criticize severely his hazardous etymologies, his identification of different mythical figures without sufficient grounds, his mixing up of heroic saga and myth, and, above all, his bent for remodeling myths in order to make them fit into a system which (they say) never existed."

"Rydberg's work was, then, stamped as a failure, and this verdict from certain points of view cannot be considered unjust, seems to have caused the book to fall into oblivion, a fate which surely it has not deserved." Among contemporary Swedish reviewers, Hildebrand and Bååth were appreciative, the latter unreservedly praising the work. In 1892, Irish scholar Stopford A. Brooke remarked: "When we have made every allowance for a certain fancifulness, and for the bias which a well-loved theory creates, this book is a real contribution to Northern mythology." While, in 1942, Fredrik Gadde concluded:

"Even though the views set forth by Rydberg never stood a chance of being accepted, there are points in his exposition that deserve being once more brought to light."

Since their publication, some of Rydberg's mythological theories have been cited in a number of other scholarly works including his theory regarding a World Mill, the dead, and his identification of Harbard with Loki in the Poetic Edda poem Hárbarðsljóð. He has been mentioned as one of several writers who proposed analogs of Ask and Embla in comparative mythology, and who sought Indo-Iranian analogs for the Poetic Edda poem, Völuspá. Marvin Taylor cites Rydberg's definition of the phrase, "dómr um dauðan hvern," as predating that of a more contemporary writer cited by the author in his review of Julia Zernack's Geschichten aus Thule, 1994, published in the Saga-Book of the Viking Society. (Note: "If Zernack wants to use the word already, how about mentioning Viktor Rydberg, who made the same point in 1886 (Undersökningar i germansk mythologi, I 373)?")

== Bibliography ==
Many of Rydberg's works can be found catalogued on the Project Runeberg website listed below.

- 1857, Fribytaren på Östersjön
  - The Freebooter of the Baltic, translated by Caroline L. Broomall, 1891.
- 1858, Singoalla
  - Singoalla, A Legend-Story, translated by Josef Fredbärj, 1904.
- 1859, Den siste Atenaren
  - The Last Athenian, translated by William W. Thomas Jr.
- 1862, Bibelns lära om Kristus (‘Christ According to the Bible')
- 1865, Medeltidens Magi
  - "The Magic of the Middle Ages" translated by August Hjalmar Edgren.
- 1871, Lille Viggs äventyr på julafton (Little Vigg's Adventures on Christmas Eve)
  - Little Vigg's Christmas Eve, in the anthology, Australia Once a Month, translated by D. Conolly, 1885.
- 1874, Romerska sägner om apostlarna Petrus och Paulus
  - Roman Legends about the Apostles Paul and Peter, translated by Ottilia von Düben, 1898.
- 1877, Romerska Dagar
  - Roman Days, translated by Alfred C. Clark, 1877.
- 1876, Swedish translation of Goethe's Faust
- 1882, Segerssvärdet (The Sword of Victory)
- 1887, Fädernas gudasaga
  - Our Fathers' Godsaga, translated by William P. Reaves, 2003.
- 1886, Undersökningar i germanisk mythologi, första delen, (Investigations into Germanic Mythology, Volume I).
  - Teutonic Mythology translated by Rasmus B. Anderson, 1889
- 1889, Undersökningar i germanisk mythologi, andre delen.
  - Viktor Rydberg's Investigations into Germanic Mythology, Volume 2, Parts 1 & 2, translated by William P. Reaves, 2004–2007.
- 1882–1891 Dikter (Poems)
  - A selection of these appear in Anthology of Swedish Lyrics from 1750 to 1925, translated by Charles W. Stork, 1930; and The North! To the North!: Five Swedish Poets of the Nineteenth Century, translated by Judith Moffett, 2001.
- 1891, Vapensmeden,(The Armorer, literally "The Weapon-smith").
- 1894, Varia (Miscellanea).
- 1895 Den hvitarasens framtid ("The Future of the White Race"). Introduction to Swedish edition of Benjamin Kidd's Social Evolution. Stockholm: Hugo Gebers.

== Other sources ==
- Gustafson, Alrik, A History of Swedish Literature (Minneapolis, 1961)

Cultural offices
Preceded by Carl Vilhelm August Strandberg	Swedish Academy, Chair No 16; 1877–1895	Succeeded by Waldemar Rudin
