= Mundilfari =

Figure in Nordic mythology

Genealogy
- Children: Sól and Máni

In Norse mythology Mundilfari (Old Norse: [ˈmuntelˌfɑre]; rendered variously Mundilfari, Mundilföri and Mundilfœri) (Old Norse, possibly "the one moving according to particular times") is the father of Sól, the goddess associated with the Sun, and Máni, the god associated with the Moon. Mundilfari is attested in the Poetic Edda poem Vafþrúðnismál stanza 23, and in chapter 11 of the Prose Edda book Gylfaginning.

== Etymology ==
The name appears in various forms in attestations for the figure, some of them significantly different, and various theories have been proposed for the name. John Lindow states that if the first element, mundil- is related to mund, meaning "period of time," then the name may be a kenning for the Moon, as Rudolf Simek theorizes.

== See also ==
- Hyperion (Titan)
- World Mill
