= Grönsö Manor =

Manor in Grönsö, Sweden

- Sweden
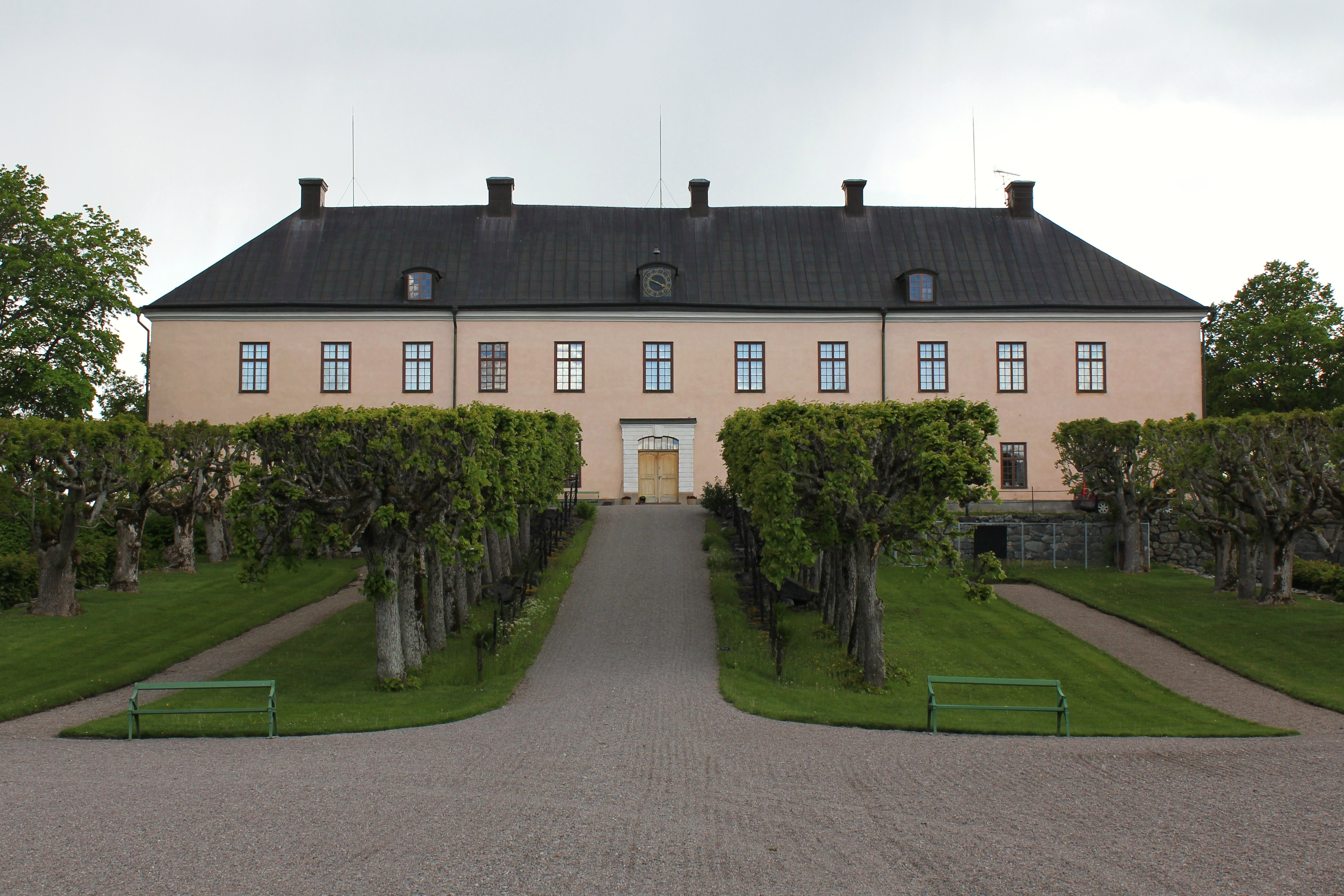
- Grönsö manor in May 2011

Site information
- Type: Manor
- Open to the public: Yes, guided tours

Location
- Coordinates: 59°28′21″N 17°14′45″E

Site history
- Built: c. 1607–1611
- Built by: Johan Skytte

Grönsö Manor (older and alternative spelling Grönsöö) is a manor on the island Grönsö in Lake Mälaren. It lies in Enköping Municipality, Sweden.

== History and architecture ==
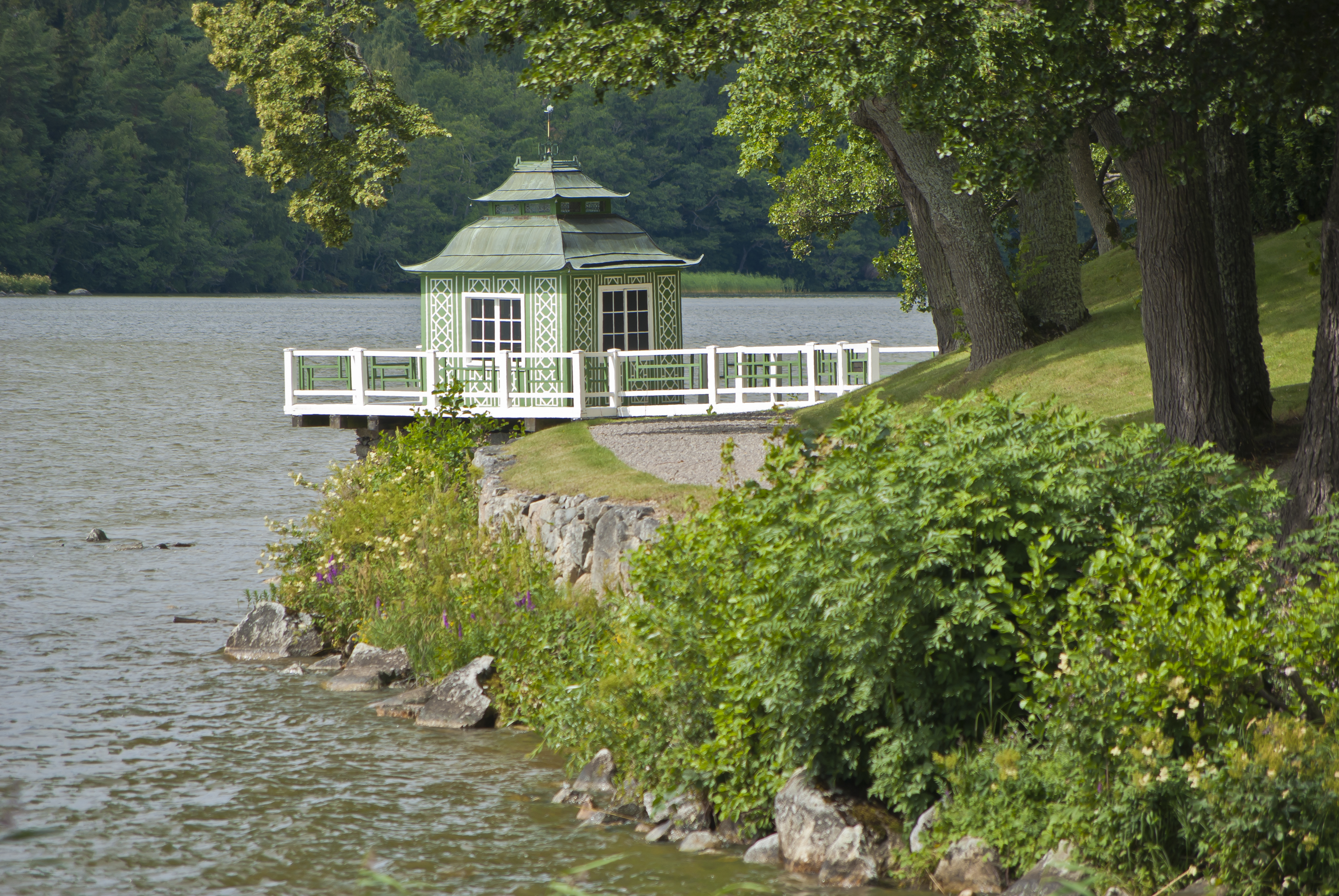
The "Chinese pavilion" in the park

There has been a small village on the site of the present manor at least since Middle Ages. During the 16th century the village consisted of five farms. A medieval manor, Utö hus, lies opposite Grönsö and is visible from the manor park. One of the farms of the medieval village was given as a gift to Johan Skytte by Prince (later King) Gustavus Adolphus. Skytte was the tutor of the future king and would later become, among other things, chancellor of Uppsala University and member of the Privy Council of Sweden. Between 1608 and 1609 he acquired the rest of the village and founded the present manorial estate. A note from 1611 mentions that the building of the manor house had at that time just commenced.

The first manor house was a rather elaborate building with corner towers and a central roof spire. It has subsequently been rebuilt and reshaped, but structurally retains essentially its original layout.

The estate passed on to Johan Skytte's son Bengt Skytte and later to Bengt Skytte's daughter Maria Skytte. It stayed in the family during the entire 17th century but was then reduced to the Crown. During the 18th century, it had several different owners. During the ownership of the Falkenberg family, the manor was repaired and reconstructed. During this period the manor attained its present rather simple look. During the second half of the same century Grönsö was owned by the medical doctor David von Schultzenheim, under whose ownership several of the interiors were remade in a simple form of Neoclassical style, sometimes referred to as "Gustavian" after Gustav III of Sweden. During the ownership of von Schultzenheim, the park was also expanded and the still visible "Chinese pavilion" built. Its style is reminiscent of that of William Chambers and it is decorated inside with shells and rocks from East Asia.

In 1820, the ownership of the manor passed to Marshal of the Court Reinhold Fredrik von Ehrenheim. It has since stayed in the von Ehrenheim family who still live there today.

=== Interior ===
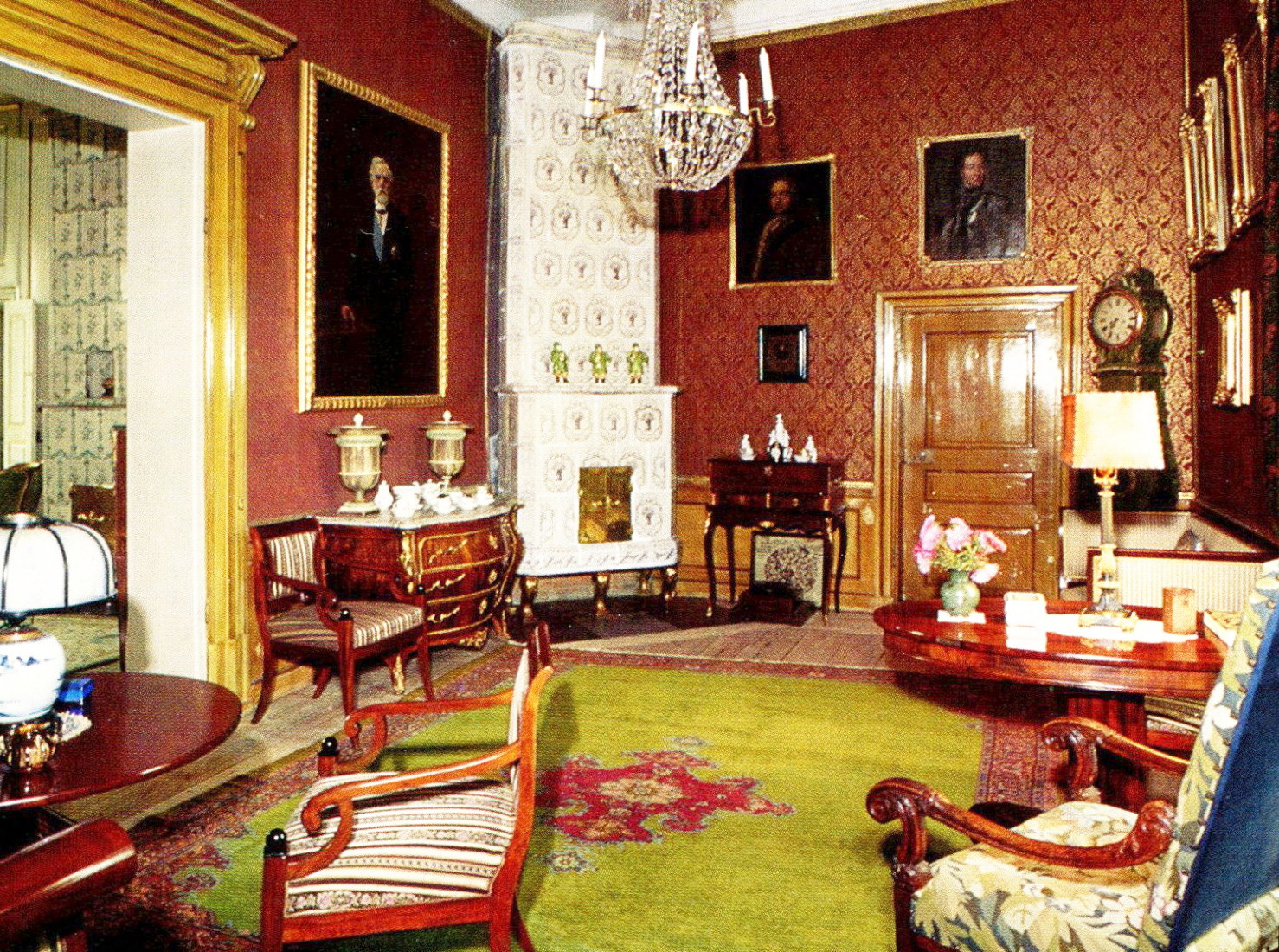
Red atrium.

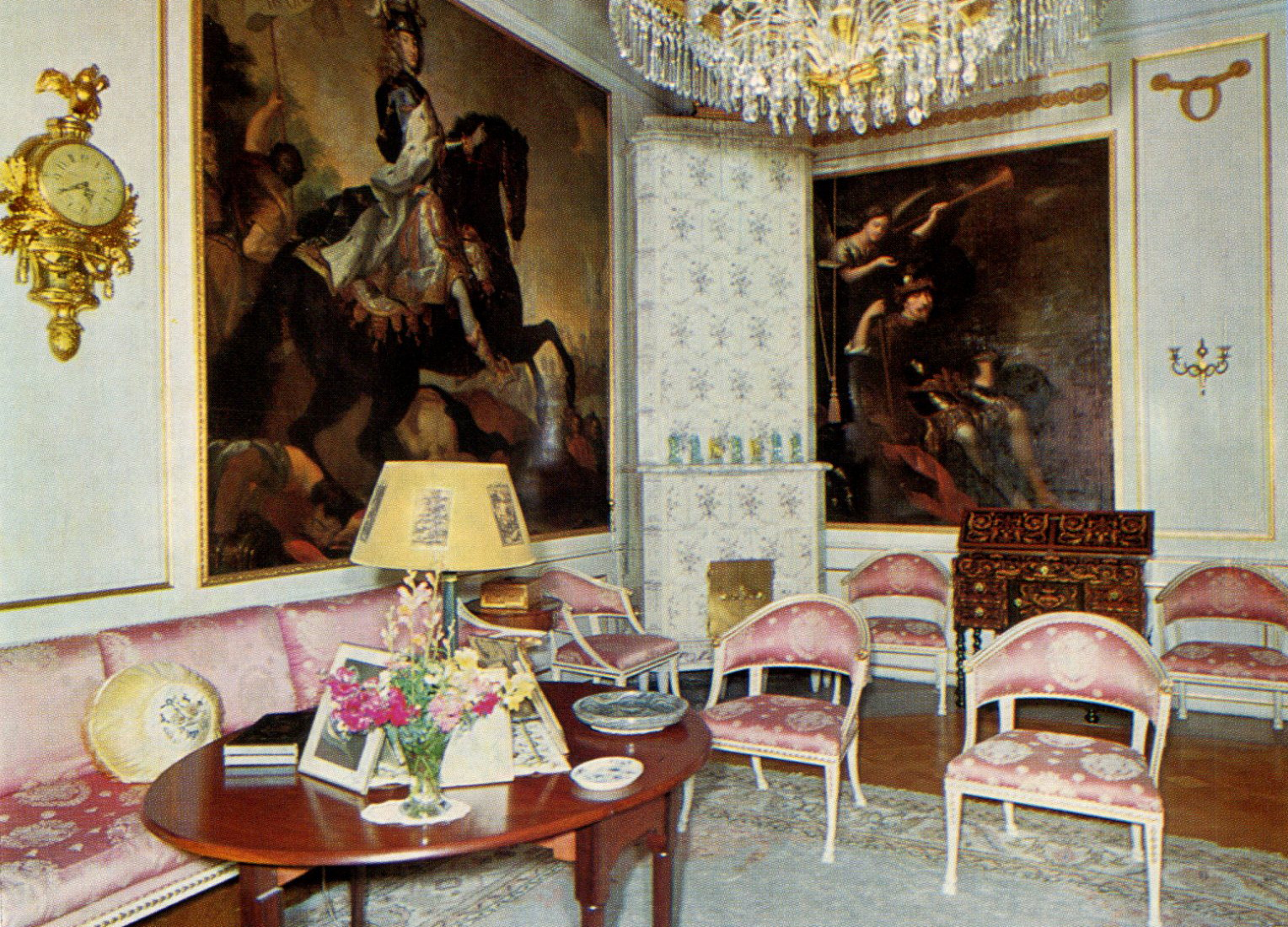
Red saloon.

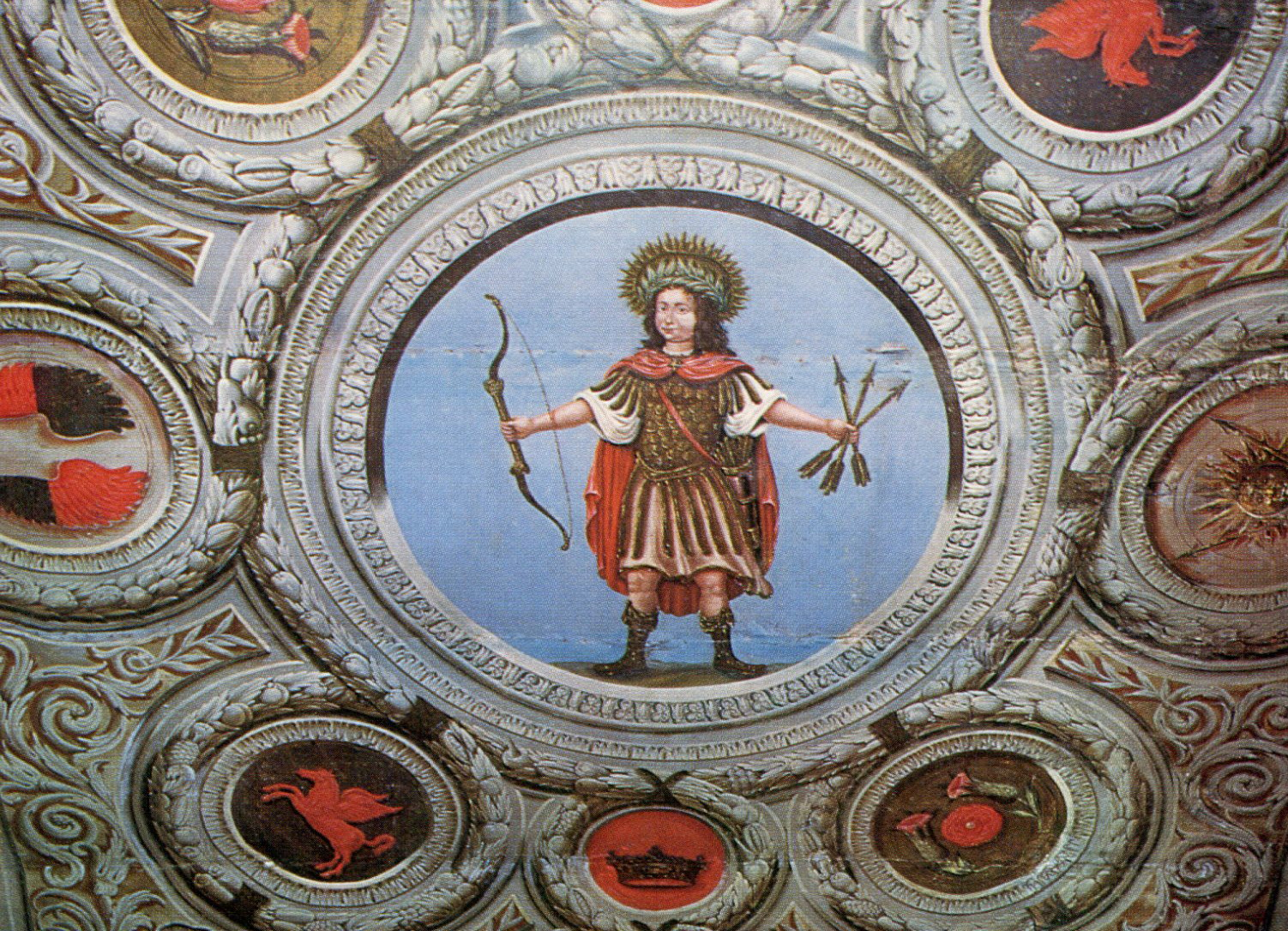
The shooting room's ceiling.

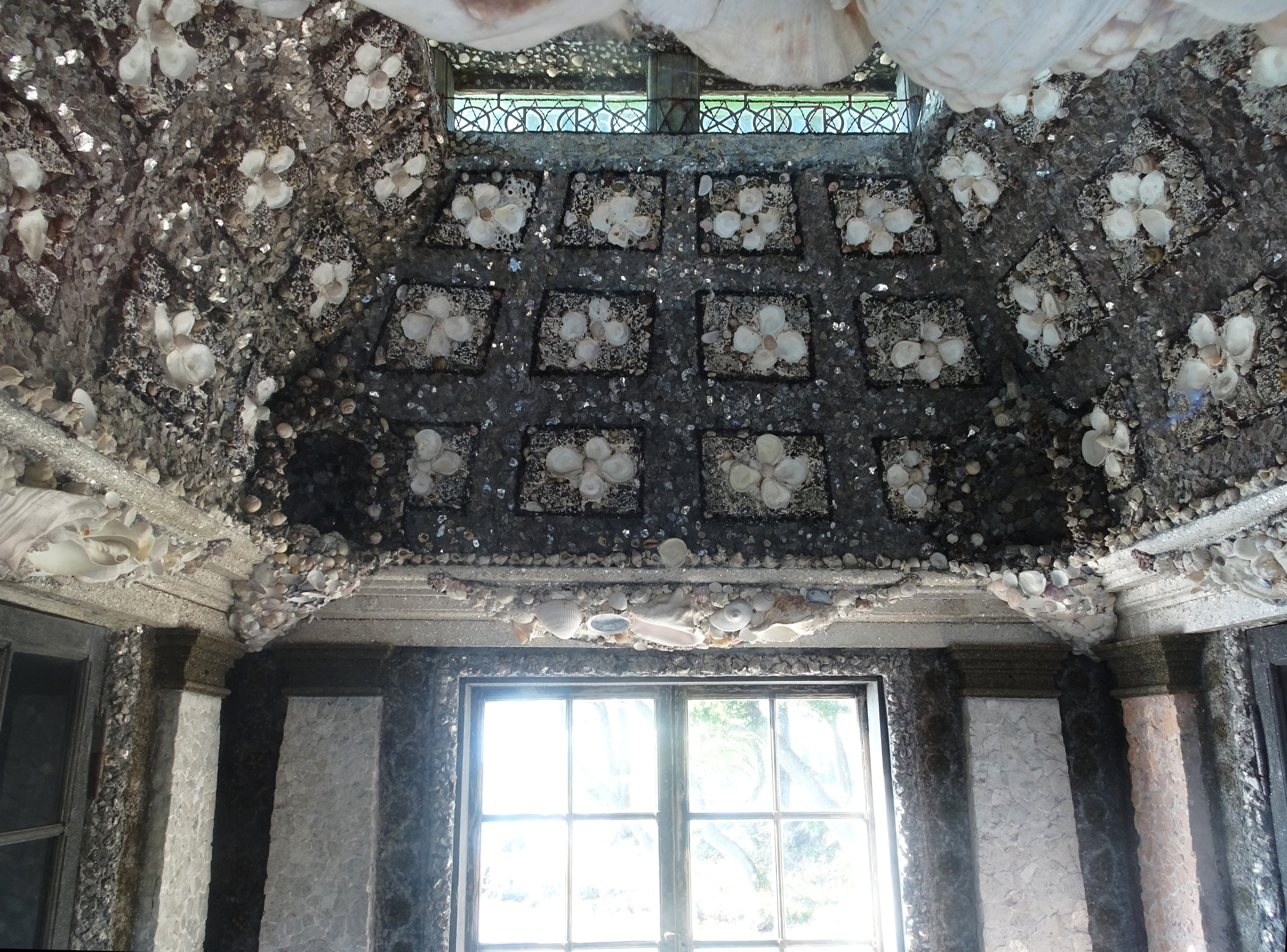
The shell pavilion.

== Apple production ==
An apple orchard was established at the estate in 1623 by Johan Ludvigsson, former royal gardener to King Charles IX of Sweden. During replanting works in the 1890s, dropped coins dating from 1634 were found stuck among the roots of a tree. The manor's orchard still produces apples today, which according to the present owners make it Sweden's oldest commercial orchard. Apples and apple juice are produced at the estate. The cultivars used for the juice and hence grown in the orchard are among others Åkerö, Ingrid Marie, and Gravenstein.

== See also ==
- List of castles and palaces in Sweden
