= Social evolution =

Social evolution may refer to:

- Social change
- Sociocultural evolution, the change of cultures and societies over time
- Sociobiology, explaining social behavior in terms of evolution
- Cultural evolution, an evolutionary theory of social change
- Evolution of eusociality, the evolution of highly cooperative behaviors in animal species
- Social Evolution, an 1894 book by Benjamin Kidd
- Social Darwinism
