= Seizure of the Gilded Lion =

Pirate attack on a Dutch ship in 1661

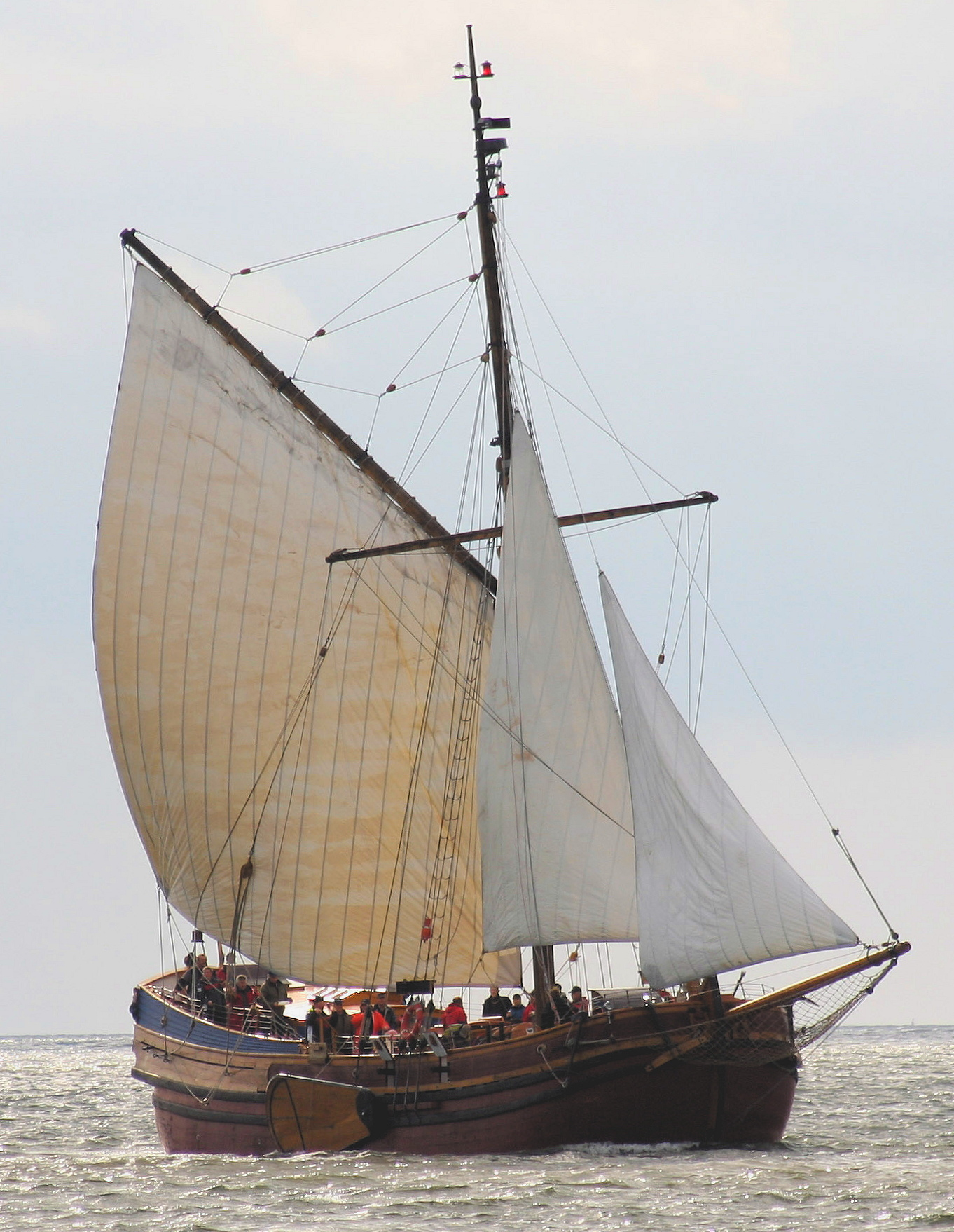
- Picture taken of the Christine af Bro, a modern Bojort
| Date | 1661 |
| Location | Northeast of Bornholm |
| Result | Pirate victory |

Belligerents
| Swedish pirates | Dutch Republic |

Commanders and leaders
| Gustaf Adolf Skytte; Gustav Drake | Unknown † |

Units involved
| Unknown | (Dutch Republic) The Gilded Lion |

Strength
| 15 men 1 ship | 1 Bojort |

Casualties and losses
| Unknown | Disputed amount killed (Note: Some historians say the entire crew was killed while others say only 4 or 5 were killed); 1 bojort destroyed |

The seizure of the Gilded Lion was a successful attack by Swedish pirates on a Dutch Bojort named "The Gilded Lion" in 1661.

== Background ==
In the summer of 1661, the Swedish pirates, Gustaf Adolf Skytte and Gustav Drake, along with a crew of 15 men and one ship, decided to go on an expedition to England.

== Seizure ==
After heavy storms, the Swedish pirates had been forced to sail back towards the Danish sound, it was here that they caught sight of a Dutch bojort, which was on its way from Amsterdam to Norrköping, and after being found to carry salt, herring, spices and wine, the Swedish pirates agreed to attack it.

When the pirates sailed a little past Bornholm, they started chasing the bojort, and the crew cast lots to see who would climb onboard the bojort first.

When they came up to the ship, Pär Länsman quickly bound the ships to each other, and a shot came from the pirate ship, it came from a pirate named Sven Lifknecht, who shot and killed one of the Dutch crew on the bojort. Following this, the pirates quickly stormed the bojort, and skirmishes quickly broke out. When the captain of the bojort looked out of his sliding door, he was shot down with a pistol by Måns Månsson, who followed with a second shot, killing the captain.

Following this, the pirates shot the crew, who were later drowned by attaching stones to their feet, leading to 4–5 Dutch being killed, although other historians have claimed the entire crew was killed.

== Aftermath ==
After the seizure, the Swedes managed to take a cargo consisting of salt, tobacco, wine, herring, lemons, thimble's, ribbons, strings, and sewing needles. After their successful raid, they retreated and kept a low profile for a few months, but despite their attempts, the raid became known and the culprits were identified and apprehended.
