= World Mill =

Mytheme in various mythologies

The World Mill (also "heavenly mill", "cosmic mill" and variants) is a mytheme suggested as recurring in Indo-European and other mythologies. It involves the analogy of the cosmos or firmament and a rotating millstone. The mytheme was extensively explored in Viktor Rydberg's 1886 Investigations into Germanic Mythology, who provides both ancient Scandinavian and Indian examples. Donald Mackenzie described the World Mill’s relationship to the sacred spiral and the revolution of the starry heavens, providing analogs in Chinese, Egyptian, Babylonian, and AmerInd folklore, before concluding "that the idea of the World Mill originated as a result of the observation of the seasonal revolutions of the constellation of the 'Great Bear'."

Clive Tolley (1995) examined the significance of the mytheme in Indo-European and Finnish mythology. Tolley found that "the image of a cosmic mill, ambivalently churning out well-being or disaster, may be recognized in certain fragmentary myths", adding additional Indo-European and Finnish analogs of the mill to the material previously considered by Rydberg and others. Tolley comes to the conclusion that

the cosmic mill was not, in extant Norse sources, a widely developed mythologem. Nonetheless, the myth of Mundilfæri connects the turning of the cosmos via a 'mill-handle' with the regulation of seasons, and the myth of Bergelmir suggests the concept of a creative milling of a giant's body, associated in some way with the sea,

Richard M. Dorson surveyed the views of 19th-century writers on the World Mill in his 1968 historical review, Peasant Customs and Savage Myths: Selections from the British Folklorists, and the mytheme is discussed in the Kommentar zu den Liedern der Edda, in regard to the Eddic poem, Grottasöngr.

== See also ==
- Hamlet's Mill
- Rota Fortunae
- Axis Mundi
- Wyrd
- Sampo
- Dark Satanic Mills
- Mills of God
- Grótti
