= Christina Anna Skytte =

Swedish pirate (1643–1677)

- Born: November 9, 1643
- Died: January 21, 1677 (aged 33)

Christina Anna Skytte (9 November 1643 – 21 January 1677) was a Swedish baroness and pirate.

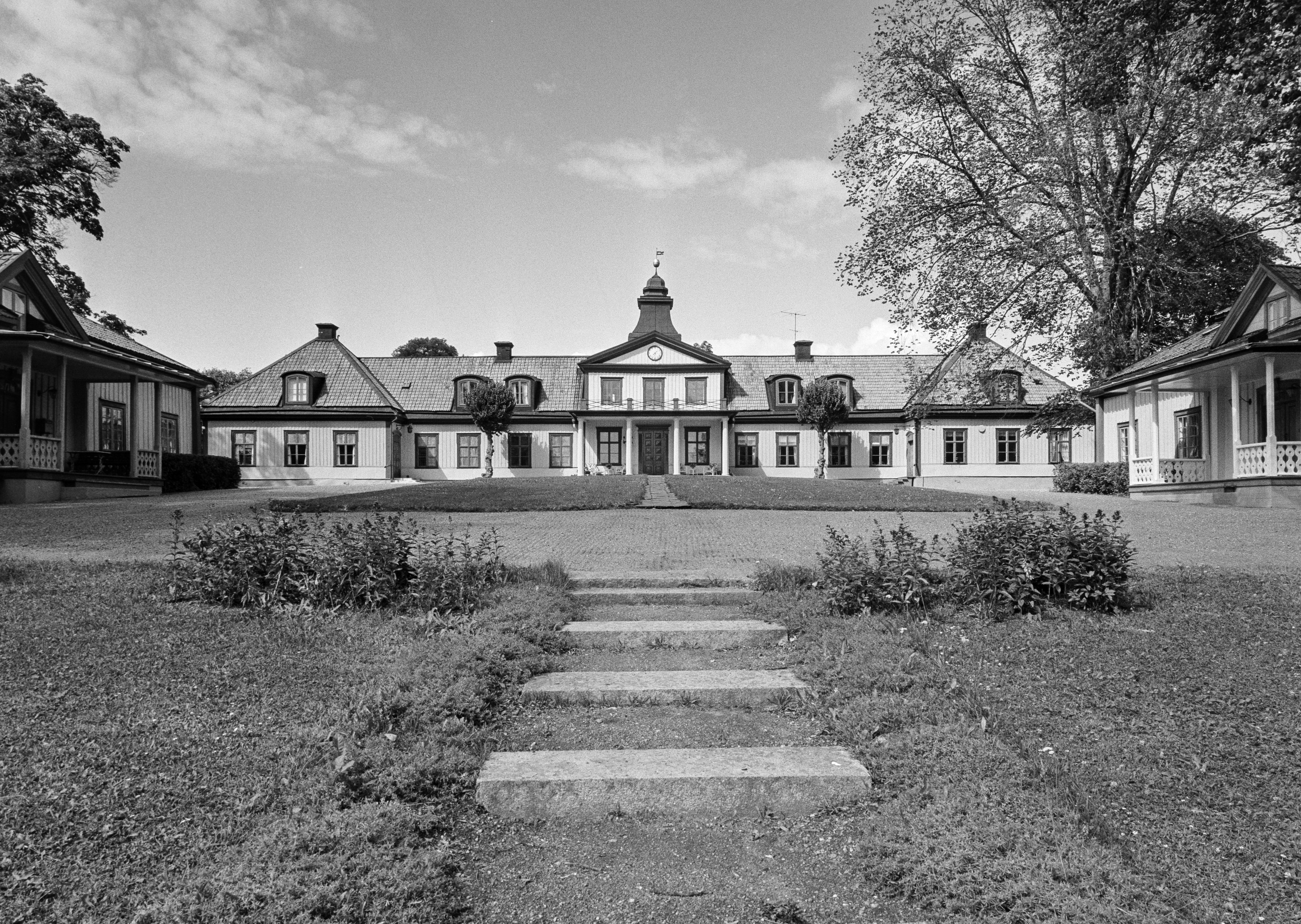
Edeby gård in Ripsa

== Life ==
Christina Anna Skytte was born in the parish of Ålems at Mönsterås in Kalmar County, Sweden. Her parents were Anna Bielkenstjerna (c. 1617–1663) and Jacob Skytte af Duderhof (1616–1654) who served as governor of Östergötland during 1645–1650. She was the granddaughter of Swedish governor, Johan Skytte (1577–1645), and niece of the salonist and poet Vendela Skytte (1608–1629).

=== Piracy ===
From 1657 onward, her brother, Gustav Skytte, secretly managed a pirate ship, attacked and plundered ships in the Baltic Sea. Christina Anna and her fiancé, Gustaf Drake (1634–84), were also initiated in this activity and became his partners. Christina Anna and Gustaf Drake were no passive partner in her brother's enterprise. They reportedly had one of their partners killed, likely due to him wanting to withdraw from the business. In 1662, she was reportedly present when they attacked a Dutch merchant ship, murdered its crew and sunk the ship somewhere between Öland and Bornholm. This attack exposed them after the shipwreck washed up on the beach of Öland, in August of that same year. This event led to the spread of rumors in the capital pointing them out as responsible. The Dutch envoy in Stockholm demanded action from the Swedish authorities.

=== Later life ===
Christina Anna and Gustaf Drake married in 1662 and fled to Denmark to avoid arrest. Her brother, Gustav Skytte, did not manage to escape; he was arrested, put on trial for piracy, judged guilty as charged and executed in April 1663. Christina Anna was only 18 when her brother was arrested. Being a married woman and therefore a minor in contemporary law, Christina Anna was not personally prosecuted, but her spouse Gustaf Drake was charged in his absence and sentenced to confiscation of his property. In 1668, they returned to Sweden. Gustaf Drake was tried in Gothenburg, but was pardoned. Thereafter, the couple settled at Edeby gård in the parish of Ripsa at Nyköping in Södermanland.

== In fiction ==
Gustav Skytte was featured by Viktor Rydberg (1828–1895) in the 1857 novel The Freebooter of the Baltic (Fribytaren på Östersjön Stockholm: Albert Bonniers förlag).
