= Benjamin Kidd =

British sociologist

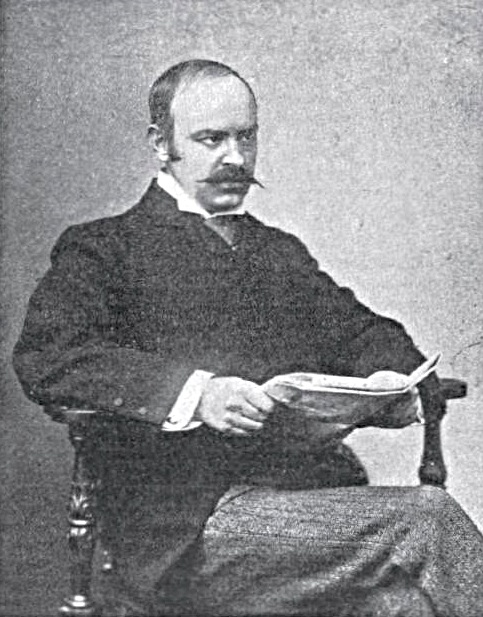
- Born: 9 September 1858; County Clare, Ireland
- Died: 2 October 1916 (aged 58); South Croydon, England
- Education: Autodidact
- Occupation: Sociologist
- Known for: Applying biological evolution theory to social evolution
- Notable work: Social Evolution (1894) The Science of Power (1918)
- Spouse: Maud Emma Isabel Perry of Weston-super-Mare
- Children: Franklin and twins John and Rolf

Benjamin Kidd (9 September 1858 – 2 October 1916) was a British sociologist whose first job was a civil service clerk, but by persistent self-education, he became internationally famous by the publication of his book Social Evolution in 1894. Kidd argued that the "evolution of society and of modern civilization" is caused not by reason or science, but by the force of "religious beliefs." The book had worldwide circulation and impacted the Social Gospel movement.

Kidd is reckoned as a founder of sociology as a discipline. Influenced by Darwinism and evolution, Kidd sought and found analogies between the evolution of human society and of the biological organism.

Kidd's prolific writings had a major impact at the time. However, the world was so different after the First World War that Kidd's work became relegated to historical interest.

== Early life ==
Benjamin Kidd was born in County Clare, Ireland, on 9 September 1858, the first of eleven children of Benjamin Kidd (c.1831–1914), a constable in the Royal Irish Constabulary, and his wife, Mary Rebecca (1833–1916). The son did not have "early advantages of education or social position." However, his "self-belief and drive" were so strong that Kidd's life became a "rags to riches" story.

== First job ==
Kidd's first job began in 1878 when he began work as a clerk to the Board of Inland Revenue at Somerset House in London. To get this job, Kidd (at age 18) passed the lower division civil service examination. In London, Kidd's life was "frugal and solitary," but his ambition drove him to attend evening classes and to read incessantly. Kidd's frugality was necessitated by the fact that the salary of a lower division clerk placed him in the lower end of the salary band of the lower middle class, £150 at most. This was barely enough to live on, with no chance of raises for 13 years.

In 1887, Kidd married Maud Emma Isabel Perry of Weston-Super-Mare. They had three sons: Franklin and twins John and Rolf.

Kidd could not be content to remain an unknown clerk. He believed that he had a "mission in life" to be a self-made "social prophet" as were Auguste Comte and Herbert Spencer. He spent his seventeen years as a clerk preparing for his mission. His preparation began as reading books written by others. During the last ten years, Kidd focussed on writing Social Evolution, the book that propelled him into international fame.

== Social Evolution ==
Royalties from the publication of his Social Evolution in 1894 allowed Kidd to leave his job. In short order, he went from being an obscure clerk to the internationally famous social prophet toward which he had long worked.

Kidd wrote Social Evolution with "self-confidence and conviction" that its content was of vast importance. The major theme of the book (and later works), is that religion is "the chief agency in promoting philanthropy and the political enfranchisement." In contrast, Kidd views reason as "selfish and short-sighted."

The book was timely because "evolution and naturalism" were threatening some religious beliefs. Kidd offered a faith that took into account and made use of these new discoveries. Kidd is characterized as a "social darwinist". The term "social evolution" was first used in 1853. It saw parallels between the new theories of biological evolution and the evolution of societies. Kidd wrote about these parallels in the "Application of the Doctrine of Evolution to Sociological Theory" as the Preface to the Encyclopædia Britannica 1902, Vol 5.

Social Evolution passed through several editions and was translated into German (1895), Swedish (1895), French (1896), Russian (1897), Italian (1898), Chinese (1899), Czech (1900), Danish (1900), and Arabic (1913).

One reason for the book's success was its "violent attack on socialism" that appealed to the more conservative population. Another reason was that it appealed to religionists. Kidd ascribed Western civilization's "modern progress toward the equalization of the conditions of life" to the "immense fund of altruism" that had been generated by the Christian religion. A third reason for the book's success was that Kidd predicted a future in which workers would have equal rights and opportunities. This optimism appealed to the workers who in the Gilded Age were often "consigned to lives of bitter toil with little hope for advancement."

=== Précis of Social Evolution ===
"The very foundations of human thought have been rebuilt" by the emergence of Darwinian science (viii). To those "who have caught the spirit of Darwinian science" of evolution, a basic question is whether "religious systems have a function to perform in the evolution of society".

An evolution of society has occurred unlike anything in "previous history", and it has been "religion" that effected it. People have always turned toward the "Super-natural" rather than the natural, toward the "ultra-rational" rather than the rationale for "sanctions" for their conduct.

The development of Western civilization has been undergirded by the "Christian religion" that brought something new to the world: "an enthusiastic devotion to its corporate welfare". Due to the Christian religion's "altruism," Western civilization has witnessed a "great extension of political power" to the masses. The altruism of Christianity caused the first stage of Western civilization's social evolution. The second stage was the Reformation that liberated the "altruistic feeling" that had been instilled by Christianity.

Effects of the "great development of humanitarian feelings" that marks Western civilization include charitable giving, suppression of the slave trade, concern to remedy injustices, sensitivity for the "misery or suffering" of humans and animals, and the evolution toward a society with "no privileged class" and "equality of opportunity".

In summary, the force of Western civilization's evolution "toward the equalization of the conditions of life" lies in the "great fund of altruistic feeling generated by the ethical system on which our civilization is based" that was brought about by the Christian religion."

== Fame ==
Because Kidd’s royalties from Social Evolution had enabled him to quit his clerk’s job and be a full-time "social prophet," he was free to travel as a celebrity. Between 1894 and 1902, Kidd traveled extensively in the United States and Canada (1898), and in South Africa (1902). He also became acquainted with many important people in London in the circles of politics, science, and literature.

While in the United States, in an interview with The Outlook (New York), Kidd expressed optimism about the future for the US and England. Both countries, he said, "were heading into a future in which the masses must inevitably enjoy equal political rights and equal social opportunities." Kidd also wrote for The Times a series of articles later published as The Control of the Tropics.

Kidd came into the Social Gospel movement when, during his to America, he met the leading clergymen of the movement including Washington Gladden, Lyman Abbott. William D. P. Bliss, and Josiah Strong.

Kidd was now an international celebrity. As such, he faced numerous requests for interviews, articles, and lectures. His fame so "frightened" him that he mostly declined requests and thus missed out on lucrative fees. He remained a "withdrawn personality" who was "ill at ease" in public.

== Responses to Social Evolution ==
Social Evolution was marked by its ambiguity. It oscillated between "utopian socialism" and "doomsday economism" that would lead to "global conflict between the great powers." While expressing appreciation for "socialist theory," Kidd stated that socialism was not viable in practice. The ambiguity in Kidd's writing was so pronounced that he was called a "Christian socialist" by some, but pro-business by others. Thus, it was that Social Evolution was both "fiercely attacked" and "fiercely supported."

Support
Support for Social Evolution came from notable readers. The philanthropist Charles Booth described the book as "striking and original." Alfred Marshall, an influential economist, found the book so exciting and interesting that it spawned an acquaintanceship with Kidd.

Lester Frank Ward, "the acknowledged founder of American sociology," called the "tone" of Social Evolution "generally healthy."

In an obituary for Kidd, Social Evolution was praised for its "originality and force."

Attacks
"Believers were offended by Kidd's functional defence of religion, scientists by his faith in unreason and loose speculation, the scholarly by his pinched concept of rationality and his slanted account of history." One scholarly book expressed "grave distrust of the process by which Mr. Kidd reaches his conclusion" and "of the terms in which he formulates" it.

Theodore Roosevelt found the book's "argument is so loose" that it could be construed as meaning contradictory things. The central point of Kidd's argument is "radically false."

The Oxford Dictionary of National Biography' (1927) described Social Evolution as "incoherent," "full of pretentious rhetoric," and like "sensational journalism." Academic circles never took Kidd's work seriously.

A vehement critic of Benjamin Kidd's ideas about social evolution was the freethinker and music critic Ernest Newman. Under his pseudonym Hugh Mortimer Cecil, Newman criticized Kidd's notion of progress and the teleological content of his model of social evolution as pseudoscience.

== Principles of Western Civilization (1902) ==
Kidd's Principles of Western Civilization (1902) received negative reviews as reported in The Review of Reviews. The review in the Positivist Review used such terms as "imbecility," "sonorous fatuity," "rank nonsense," and "metaphysical bamboozlement." The review in the Fortnightly Review called Kidd's history "muddled and perverted" and described the book as "a wordy confusion . . . without real definiteness or point."

== Last years ==
"Kidd's writings had been important
documents of their time. They
faded into obscurity as circumstances
changed after the First World War."

— Oxford Dictionary of National Biography

In 1903, Kidd moved away from London for a life of "ever increasing seclusion." However, he continued to write and lecture. In 1908, he lectured at the University of Oxford on the subject of "Individualism and After." In 1911, he wrote the article on "Sociology" in the Encyclopædia Britannica. From 1910 to 1914, Kidd wrote The Science of Power. However, the beginning of the first World War necessitated revision by his son, Franklin Kidd, for posthumous publication in 1918.

After a short period of ill-health Kidd died of heart disease at South Croydon on 2 October 1916."

The Science of Power (1918)
During the last six years of his life, when Kidd was writing The Science of Power, the likelihood of a global conflict increased. Because of this, Kidd’s earlier optimism about the evolution of human society evaporated. He turned away from Darwinism and imperialism. His earlier praise of western civilization turned into "a searing indictment."

The Science of Power (1918) repeated Kidd's earlier success. Looking back, he saw a continuation of Christian altruism in "the ideal of permanent goodwill among nations" with arbitration taking the place of war. However, looking at the period preceding World War I, Kidd saw a "great pagan retrogression" exemplified by the German author Ernst Haeckel in The Riddle of the Universe, a retrogression that repudiated the Christian altruistic sanction of loving one's enemies.

Kidd's hope for the future hung on the influence of women. His praise of women in the chapter "Woman is the Psychic Centre of Power in the Social Integration" appealed to feminists. Kidd viewed women as "anti-pagan, i.e. unselfish, and devoted to the interests of the race," all "in accordance with Christian altruism.

== Quotations ==
He was quoted thus -

"Oh! you wise men who would reconstruct the world! Give us the young. Give us the young. Do what you will with the world, only give us the young. It is the dreams which we teach them: it is the Utopias which we conceive for them: it is the thoughts which we think for them which will rebuild the world. Give us the young before the evil has held them and we will create a new Heaven and a new Earth."

by Sir Robert Baden-Powell in a Paper "SCOUTING AND GUIDING IN EDUCATION."

== Historiography ==
A list of assessments of Kidd by historians since 1915, names over a dozen.

One assessment of Kidd summarized his thinking as follows:

- Kidd was "inspired" by Karl Marx and Herbert Spencer (mostly Spencer), but he also "criticized" them.
- He agreed with Marxists that the "members of the ruling class were not superior."
- He believed that the "ruling families were degenerating so that new rulers had to be recruited from below."
- Kidd thought the "white race" possessed "intellectual superiority" because of its "accumulated knowledge," not (as racists held) because of an innate endowment.
- He "agreed with racists that the English race was superior" in the "ability to organize and to suppress egoistic instincts to the benefit of the community and the future."

Another historian, Robert C. Bannister assessed Kidd in the context of Social Darwinism. In Bannister's reading, Kidd caused a "flurry" by his "pop sociology." It won Kidd an immediate recognition, but in the long run "confounds and embarrasses later generations."

== Works ==
In addition to the five books listed below, Kidd "produced a prolific amount of occasional journalism, contributions to journals, encyclopaedias, reviews, columns, interviews, and letters for weeklies in Britain and America." The interview in the United States that was published in The Outlook: A Family Paper (1 September 1894) under the title of "The Future of the United States" evoked widespread comment for its optimism.

- Social Evolution (1894)
- Control of the Tropics (1898)
- Principles of Western Civilisation (1902)
- Individualism and After: The Herbert Spencer Lecture 1908
- Two Principal Laws of Sociology (1909)
- The Science of Power (1918)
- A Philosopher with Nature (1921)

== See also ==
- George Chatterton-Hill
- Social Darwinism
