= Bengt Skytte =

Swedish courtier and diplomat (1614–1683)

Viceroy of Swedish Lithuania
- In office 1655–1657

Personal details
- Born: 30 September 1614
- Died: 23 July 1683 (aged 68)
- Spouse(s): Christina Sparre; Eva Mörner
- Children: Maria Skytte
- Parent: Johan Skytte (father)
- Occupation: courtier and diplomat

Bengt Skytte af Duderhof (1614–1683) was a Swedish courtier and diplomat. He was a follower of Comenius and proposed a pansophic city, "Sophopolis".

== Early life ==
He was the son of Johan Skytte and Maria Näf (Neaf) and brother of Vendela Skytte.

He matriculated at the University of Uppsala, aged 10. In 1629, he, with Schering Rosenhane, accompanied Sir James Spens to court in London, where he was knighted by Charles I of England.

Skytte was then probably at the University of Leiden in 1629–30; and went on to study at Dorpat. In 1631, he visited the Tsardom of Russia. After that, he had two periods of study with Gerardus Vossius, to 1634.

== Courtier and diplomat ==
Skytte was appointed chamberlain to Christina, Queen of Sweden in 1633. In 1634–5, he was attached to Axel Oxenstierna in Magdeburg, on a mission to Cardinal Richelieu in Paris, and in southern Italy.

In 1651, he visited Comenius in Hungary; in that year, he was implicated by Arnold Johan Messenius in his confession before his execution. In 1651–2, he travelled from Vienna to Istanbul. On the way, he noticed analogies between the Hungarian language and the Finnish language. This was an unofficial journey. While there, he stayed for half a year in the house of a Turk, whose son Yusuf later was a Christian convert under the name of Richard Christophilus in England, as Skytte later testified.

In 1655, he became governor of Estonia as the Second Northern War broke out. In 1656, he urged Charles X Gustav of Sweden to make a defensive alliance with Russia, advice that was taken. In 1655–57, Skytte served as the viceroy of Swedish Lithuania.

== Projector ==
On a 1659 journey to London as ambassador, he launched a project for Sophopolis; it was taken up by the Hartlib Circle. Skytte was one of the supporters of John Dury in his ecumenical projects; he was also able to meet in London with Robert Boyle, and was introduced to the Gresham College group of virtuosi. His own project was for a residential college. Boyle had already had such a plan, costed at something over £1000, in a letter from John Evelyn in September 1659; Skytte's concept was on a similar scale.

While nothing came of the plan, one of the precursors of the Royal Society of the English Restoration, Skytte had backing at the time, from Hartlib and his associate John Beale, and Boyle. Hartlib gave a very circumstantial account of the position of the group of virtuosi, meeting regularly both at Gresham College and in William Ball's chambers in the Middle Temple, in a letter of 17 December 1660 to John Worthington; at this point he had not yet met with Skytte to discuss Antilia, a generic name used for pansophic projects. Skytte had approached Charles II of England for a grant to support his scheme, but the evolution of the thinking of the virtuosi bypassed his plan, and Hartlib.

In 1666, Skytte quarrelled with the Swedish court, and he travelled to see Frederick William, Elector of Brandenburg. With the help of the physician Nicholas Bonnet, he presented to the Elector a plan for a Brandenburg University, which would have a "universal" quality. The chosen location was Tangermünde. This was another "Sophopolis" or Solomon's House project, possibly in emulation of the Royal Society of London. Overambitious, it did not succeed.

In 1669, Skytte was at the court of Hanau, where he clashed with Johann Joachim Becher; he acted as patron there for Daniel Neuberger the younger (1621-1680), a sculptor in wax. In that year, also, he was reported to the authorities in Frankfurt by Philipp Jakob Spener, the Pietist, for table talk disrespectful of the Bible.

== Works ==
On his way to Berlin in 1667, Skytte met Gottfried Leibniz, who retained an interest in his ideas and, thirty years later, tried to collect his papers with Johan Gabriel Sparwenfeld; Leibniz mentioned Skytte and Georg Stiernhielm in correspondence with Hiob Ludolf in 1687 as aspiring to a harmony of many languages, and elsewhere wrote that they had met and discussed linguistics in Frankfurt. Leibniz also commented on the ostracism Skytte had suffered at this period. It is believed that Skytte had an unpublished scheme for a universal language; he worked quite closely with Stiernhielm, and they used the polyglot thesaurus of Hieronymus Megiser.

Skytte's manuscript Sol praecipuarum linguarum subsolarium, which Leibniz did not track down, remained unpublished. It passed to Johan Ihre and then to the University of Uppsala. Skytte's Hungarian word lists were used by Olaus Rudbeck and Olaus Rudbeck the younger. Skytte and Stiernhielm, Rudbeck and Urban Hjärne have been classed as "early Swedish illuminists" because of their shared interests in a broad area including aspects of alchemy and hermeticism.

== Family ==
He married first Christina Sparre in 1636, and secondly in the 1670s Eva Mörner. He was the father of Maria Skytte.
