= Social Evolution =

Written work by Benjamin Kidd

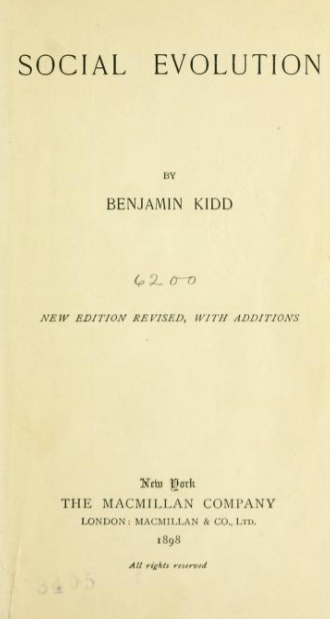
- Title page for Social Evolution (1898)
- Author: Benjamin Kidd
- Language: English
- Publisher: Macmillan
- Publication date: 1894
- Publication place: United Kingdom

Social Evolution is the title of an essay by Benjamin Kidd, which became available as a book published by Macmillan and co London in 1894. In it, Kidd discusses the basis for society as an evolving phenomenon, with reference to past societies, the important developments of his own period of thriving capitalist industry, and possible future developments.

The book is important in that it summarises the thinking of Herbert Spencer as well as others like Karl Marx at the end of the nineteenth century when many people were trying to make sense of Darwin's evolutionary ideas, and social Darwinism was a hot topic. Kidd finds flaws in the ideas of both Spencer and Marx. With no knowledge of World War I that was to come in 1914, or the Bolshevik revolution of 1917, Kidd explained the flaw in Marx's thinking, and predicted that capitalist industries would not ultimately fall into the hands of the workers as Marx was claiming was inevitable, and that any communist society must ultimately fail.

Herbert Spencer, whose writings were very influential in the latter half of the nineteenth century, thought that man's nature was evolving towards a state of perfection such that he would naturally live in harmony with society, but Kidd explained how this was incompatible with the neo-Darwinian theory that was being accepted as a result of August Weismann's doctrine of germ-line transmission without modification.

Kidd's major claim is that religion makes sense when seen as what he calls a 'supra-rational sanction' for our behaviour, which acts in the interest of survival of the group, and the yet-to-be-born members of the group, and is necessarily in conflict with our basic human instincts which act in favour of the individual in his lifetime. Thus, while not believing in any supernatural being, Kidd proposed that religion, a feature of so many past and present societies, was probably essential to the evolutionary survival of a society.

== See also ==
- Social evolution (disambiguation)
- Auguste Comte
- Evolutionary psychology
- Sociocultural evolution
- Origin of religion
- Psychology of religion
