= Vendela Skytte =

Swedish noblewoman and writer (1608–1629)

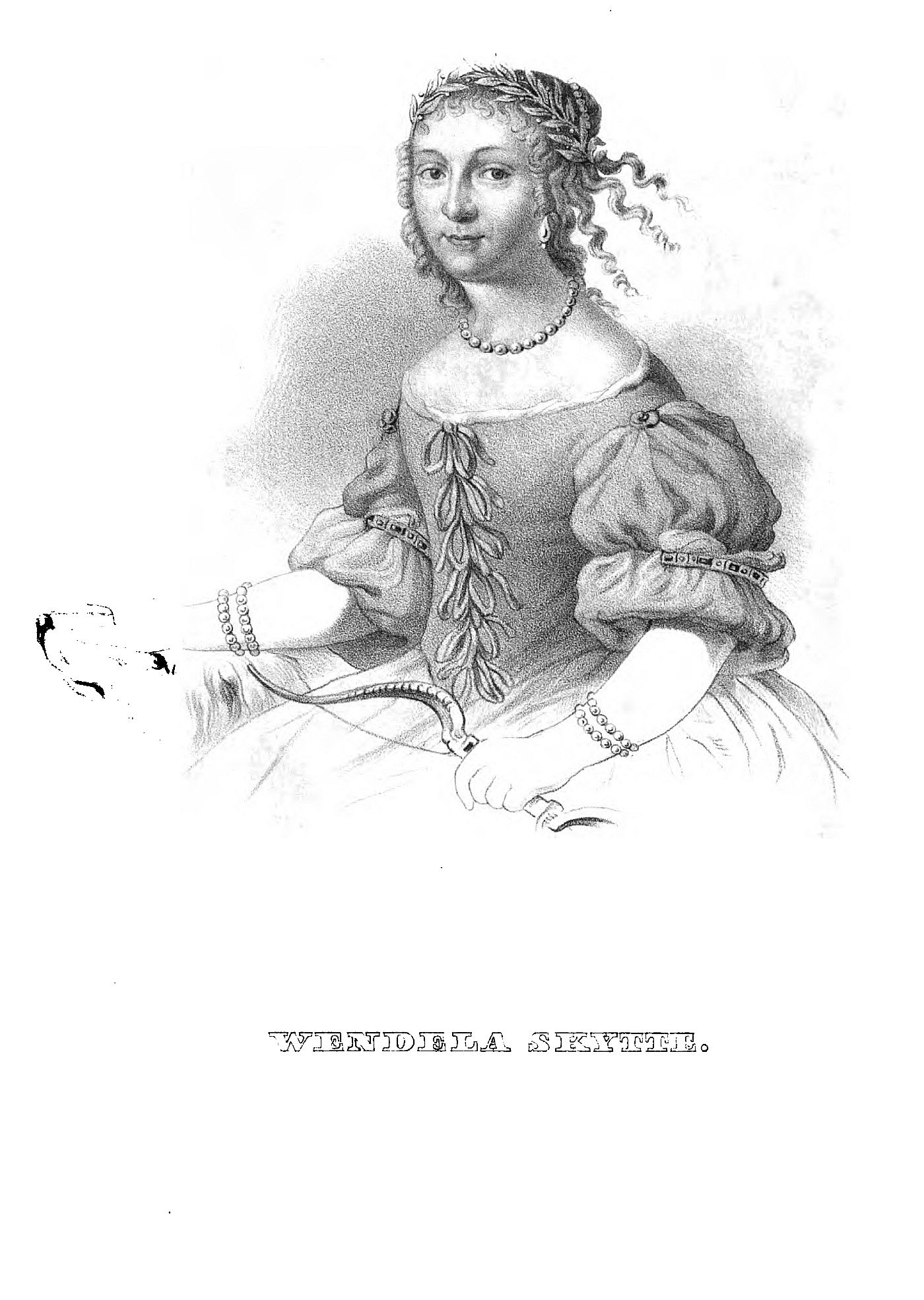
Vendela Skytte

Vendela Skytte (or Wendela Skytte) (8 December 1608 – 18 August 1629) was a Swedish noblewoman, salonist and writer, poet and Lady of Letters. During her lifetime, she became an ideal and role model for a learned female scholar.

== Biography ==
Vendela Skytte was born to statesman and noble Johan Skytte and Maria Näf and became the aunt of Gustav Skytte, Maria Skytte and Christina Anna Skytte. Growing up in an environment where humanists such as Thomas More, Erasmus of Rotterdam and Juan Luis Vives were popular, she was given the same education as her brothers by her father – her sister Anna Skytte also became respected for her learning. She studied theology, ethics, history, philology and geology, and mastered Latin, French, German and Greek. This was unusual, as the educational level was not normally this high for females of the nobility. She corresponded in Latin, and became known for her poetry.

Vendela Skytte was famed in her lifetime for her learning and academic abilities, qualities which were then regarded as rare for her sex, and came to be regarded as the ideal of a female academic. She was praised for keeping her femininity despite her learning, two things regarded as contradictory by her contemporaries. She has been called the most learned female of her country before Christina of Sweden.

She held a salon and participated in the contemporary intellectual debate. She surrounded herself with scientists and artists and corresponded with the learned Catharina Burea. Aside from her learning, she was admired for her beauty and wit. Georg Stiernhielm called her "Sexus et sæculi miraculum" ("The wonder of her time and her sex") for her intellect and beauty.

She married the noble colonel lieutenant Hans Kyle in May 1626. Her spouse later became governor of Österbotten, but during the lifetime of Vendela, he was in the service of the army of Gustav II Adolf during the Thirty Years' War. She sometimes accompanied him during his service in the war in Germany.

According to the legend, Vendela Skytte conducted a religious debate with learned Catholic males from the Jesuit College in Braunsberg in East Prussia "by which she with superior skill in Latin questioned the most sacred ideals of the Catholic religion", and won the debate in perfect Latin.

Vendela Skytte died of the plague with her newborn child shortly after having given birth in Stralsund while visiting her spouse during his military service in Germany. She was brought to Sweden and buried in Uppsala. She left two daughters: her daughter Hillevi Kyle was also known as a very learned woman.

In the national National Portrait Gallery (Sweden) of Gripsholm, which was opened in the 1822, she was one of the first six women from Swedish history who were given a portrait in the collection, alongside Bridget of Sweden, Hedvig Charlotta Nordenflycht, Barbro Stigsdotter, Sophia Rosenhane and Sophia Elisabet Brenner.

== See also ==
- Anna Åkerhjelm
- Beata Rosenhane

== Sources ==
- Svenskt biografiskt handlexikon
- Peter Englund, Ofredsår
- Women Latin Poets, Jane Stevenson
- Vendela Skytte i Wilhelmina Stålberg, Anteckningar om svenska qvinnor (1864)
- Skytte, Vendela i Herman Hofberg, Svenskt biografiskt handlexikon (andra upplagan, 1906)
- http://members.tripod.com/minata/bps_7_dec.html
- Skytte, släkt, urn:sbl:6030, Svenskt biografiskt lexikon (art av Mattias Andersson), hämtad 2015-01-08.
- Wilhelmina Stålberg, Anteckningar om svenska qvinnor (Notes on Swedish women)
- A.L. Stjerneld (anonym), Gripsholmgalleriet (Stockholm 1833)
