= Margaret Clunies Ross =

Australian retired medievalist

Margaret Beryl Clunies Ross FAHA (born 24 April 1942) is a medievalist who was until her retirement in 2009 the McCaughey Professor of English Language and Early English Literature and Director of the Centre for Medieval Studies at the University of Sydney. Her main research areas are Old Norse-Icelandic Studies and the history of their study. Since 1997 she has led the project of editing a new edition of the corpus of skaldic poetry. She has also written articles on Australian Aboriginal rituals and contributed to the Oxford Dictionary of National Biography.

== Life and career ==
Margaret Tidemann was born in Adelaide, the eldest child of Ernest Phillips Tidemann, a dentist, and his wife Beryl Chudleigh Tidemann, a kindergarten teacher. She attended Walford House, now Walford Anglican School for Girls, until she was almost 17 and graduated from the University of Adelaide in 1962 with First Class Honours in English. She was influenced to study Old and Middle English and Old Norse by Ralph Elliott, whom the university appointed as she was starting the Honours course. She then completed a B.Litt. at Oxford University on an overseas scholarship from the University of Adelaide and a scholarship from Somerville College. She then worked as a lecturer at St. Hilda's College and Lady Margaret Hall, and in 1968–69 visited the Arnamagnæan Institute in Copenhagen on a travelling fellowship. She became a lecturer at the University of Sydney in 1969, was appointed McCaughey Professor of English Language and Early English Literature in 1990 and in 1997 became Director of the Centre for Medieval Studies. She retired in 2009 and since then has been Honorary Professor in the Medieval and Early Modern Centre and Emeritus Professor of English.

== Honours ==
Clunies Ross was awarded an honorary doctorate by the University of Gothenburg and is a Fellow (arbetande ledamot) of the Royal Gustavus Adolphus Academy. She is also an Honorary Research Associate of the Department of Anglo-Saxon, Norse and Celtic at the University of Cambridge. Clunies Ross was elected a Fellow of the Australian Academy of the Humanities in 1990.

In August 2018 Clunies Ross was awarded the Icelandic Knight's Cross of the Order of the Falcon for her services to the field of Old Icelandic studies.

== Selected publications ==
- Prolonged echoes. Volume 1 Old Norse Myths in Medieval Northern Society. Volume 2 The Reception of Norse Myths in Medieval Iceland. The Viking Collection 7, 10. Odense: Odense University, 1994, 1998. ISBN 87-7838-008-1, ISBN 87-7838-332-3
- A History of Old Norse Poetry and Poetics. Cambridge: Brewer, 2005. ISBN 1-84384-034-0
- The Cambridge Introduction to the Old Norse-Icelandic Saga. Cambridge University Press, 2010. ISBN 978-0-521-51401-9
- (Ed.) Old Icelandic Literature and Society. Cambridge Studies in Medieval Literature 42. Cambridge/New York: Cambridge University, 2000. ISBN 0-521-63112-2
- (Ed. with Geraldine Barnes) Old Norse Myths, Literature and Society: Proceedings of the 11th International Saga Conference 2-7 July 2000, University of Sydney. Centre for Medieval Studies, University of Sydney, 2000, ISBN 1-86487-316-7. Repr. Odense: University Press of Southern Denmark, 2003. ISBN 87-7838-794-9
- with Stephen A. Wild. "Formal performance: the relations of music, text and dance in Arnhem Land clan songs." Ethnomusicology 28, no. 2 (1984): 209-235.
- (Ed.) Skaldic Poetry of the Scandinavian Middle Ages, vol. II, part 1–2, Poetry from the Kings’ Sagas, Turnhout: Brepols 2009, CVII + 914 pp. ISBN 978-2-503-51897-8

== Festschrift ==
- Learning and Understanding in the Old Norse World: Essays in Honour of Margaret Clunies Ross. Ed. Judy Quinn, Kate Heslop, and Tarrin Wills. Medieval Texts and Cultures of Northern Europe 18. Turnhout: Brepols, 2007. ISBN 978-2-503-52580-8
