= Johan Skytte =

Swedish statesman (1577–1645)

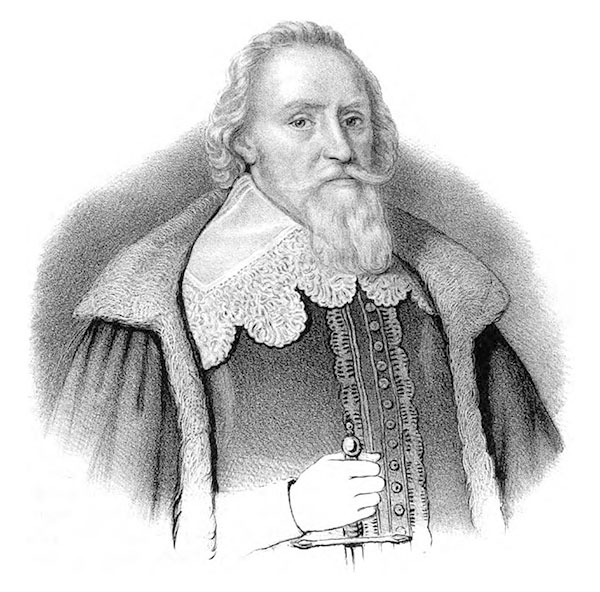
- Lithography by Johan Cardon

2nd Governor-General of Swedish Livonia
- In office 1629–1634
- Preceded by: Jacob De la Gardie
- Succeeded by: Bengt Bengtsson Oxenstierna

Governor-General of Swedish Ingria
- In office 1629–1634
- Preceded by: Nils Assersson Mannersköld
- Succeeded by: Bengt Bengtsson Oxenstierna

Governor-General of Swedish Karelia
- In office 1629–1634

Personal details
- Born: 1577 Nyköping, Sweden
- Died: 15 March 1645 (aged 67–68) Söderåkra, Sweden
- Children: Vendela Skytte, Bengt Skytte

Johan Skytte (1577, in Nyköping – 15 March 1645, in Söderåkra, Sweden) was a Swedish statesman, and the first chancellor of the Academia Gustaviana (University of Tartu, Estonia), founded in 1632.

He was a son of the mayor of Nyköping, Bengt Nilsson Skräddare, and Anna Andersdotter. While attending school in his hometown and for the nine years he was studying at foreign universities, he used the surname Schroderus, a Latinized derivation from his paternal German surname Schröder, as did also his elder brother, Ericus Schroderus (Erik Benedict Schröder) (c. 1575 – summer of 1647), a publisher, translator and pioneer on the written standard Swedish language.

In 1602, at his return from his foreign studies, Skytte was hired as tutor for the seven years old Prince Gustavus Adolphus, the future king who reigned in 1611–1632 and is credited for turning the kingdom into a "Great Power", and founding the Swedish Empire (1611–1721).

In 1603, Skytte was ennobled, and acquired the family-name Skytte, after an extinct noble family from which he claimed descent on his maternal side. His noble family members have used the family-names Skytte af Duderhof (also: Duderhoff), Skytte af Sätra, and Skytte, and some also Scott in Canada and the United States. In 1607–1611, Skytte had the Grönsö Castle (old spelling: Grönsöö) built for his personal use. It is located on the island of Grönsö in Enköping, Sweden.

In 1610, Skytte was sent to London on a diplomatic mission, an attempt to seek the hand of Elizabeth Stuart, the daughter of James I, the King of Scots, England and Ireland, for the young prince Gustavus. In 1611, Skytte became the Governor of Vestmannia, and in 1612 the head of Sweden's tax authority.

In 1617, he became a State Judge (kammarråd) and High Councillor (riksråd), and participated in the drafting of the 1617 Coronation Oath of King Gustavus Adolphus of Sweden (a.k.a. Gustav II Adolf, Gustav II Adolph). As High Councillor, Skytte was a member of the Privy Council of Sweden. It was a cabinet of medieval origin, consisting of magnates (Swedish: stormän) who advised and – at times – co-ruled the realm with the King of Sweden.

In 1620, Skytte's long-time friend and most important ally, King Gustavus Adolphus, was married to Maria Eleonora of Brandenburg. The queen consort of Sweden bore her husband a daughter, Christina, in 1626.

In 1622, Skytte was appointed Chancellor of Uppsala University, which he remained until his death, and made plans for the launching of a new appellate court in the city of Tartu (Swedish: Dorpat) in Swedish Livonia in what is now Estonia. Also in 1622, Skytte endowed the "Skyttean Professorship of Eloquence and Government" to the Uppsala University. He prescribed in detail how the chair-holder should carry out his teaching. The Skytte Chair is considered the oldest professorship in political science in the world. Skytte's own house in Uppsala, the originally medieval building known as Skytteanum, is still today used by Sweden's Department of Government; the Professor Skytteanus has their residence in an apartment in the building. Since 1995, the Skytte Foundation at Uppsala University has awarded an annual Johan Skytte Prize in Political Science).

Of the several schools in Sweden named after Skytte, one was actually founded on his initiative, the Skyttean school (Skytteanska skolan), established in 1631 in Lycksele, and moved to Tärnaby in 1867 – both places are in the northern Swedish province of Lapland. To commemorate Skytte's contribution to the education in northern Sweden, the Royal Skyttean Society was established and named after him in 1956 in Umeå.

By 1624, Skytte's job-titles had come to include the Chief Justice of Finland when – that year – he was created baron (friherre) and was granted the Barony of Tuutari (Dudern) in Ingria.

In 1629, Skytte was appointed Governor-General of Swedish Livonia, Ingria and Karelia for the period of 1629–1634. In 1632, he was appointed chancellor of the Academia Gustaviana (today's University of Tartu), which he founded that year, with the required ratification provided by King Gustavus Adolphus, briefly before the king's death on 6 November 1632 in the Battle of Lützen (1632), during the Thirty Years' War (1618–1648).

The dead King Adolphus' body was brought to Nyköping, and kept there until the funeral ceremony held in the summer of 1634 at the Nyköping Castle, where Skytte gave a speech, and Bishop Johannes Rudbeckius read a sermon dedicated to the king's daughter, Christina, Queen of Sweden. After this, the king's remains were moved to the capital city Stockholm. Also in 1634, Skytte founded – and became the first president of – the Göta Court of Appeal in Jönköping.

Johan Skytte was parent to Vendela Skytte and Bengt Skytte, and brother to Lars Bengtsson Skytte, a stadtholder of the Swedish Empire, and a distant forefather of the president of Finland, marshal Carl Gustaf Emil Mannerheim (1867–1961).

== Bibliography ==
- Ingemarsdotter, Jenny (2011). Ramism, Rhetoric and Reform: An Intellectual Biography of Johan Skytte (1577–1645). Uppsala Universitet. ISBN 978-91-554-8071-4.
