= Paper mill =

Factory that produces paper

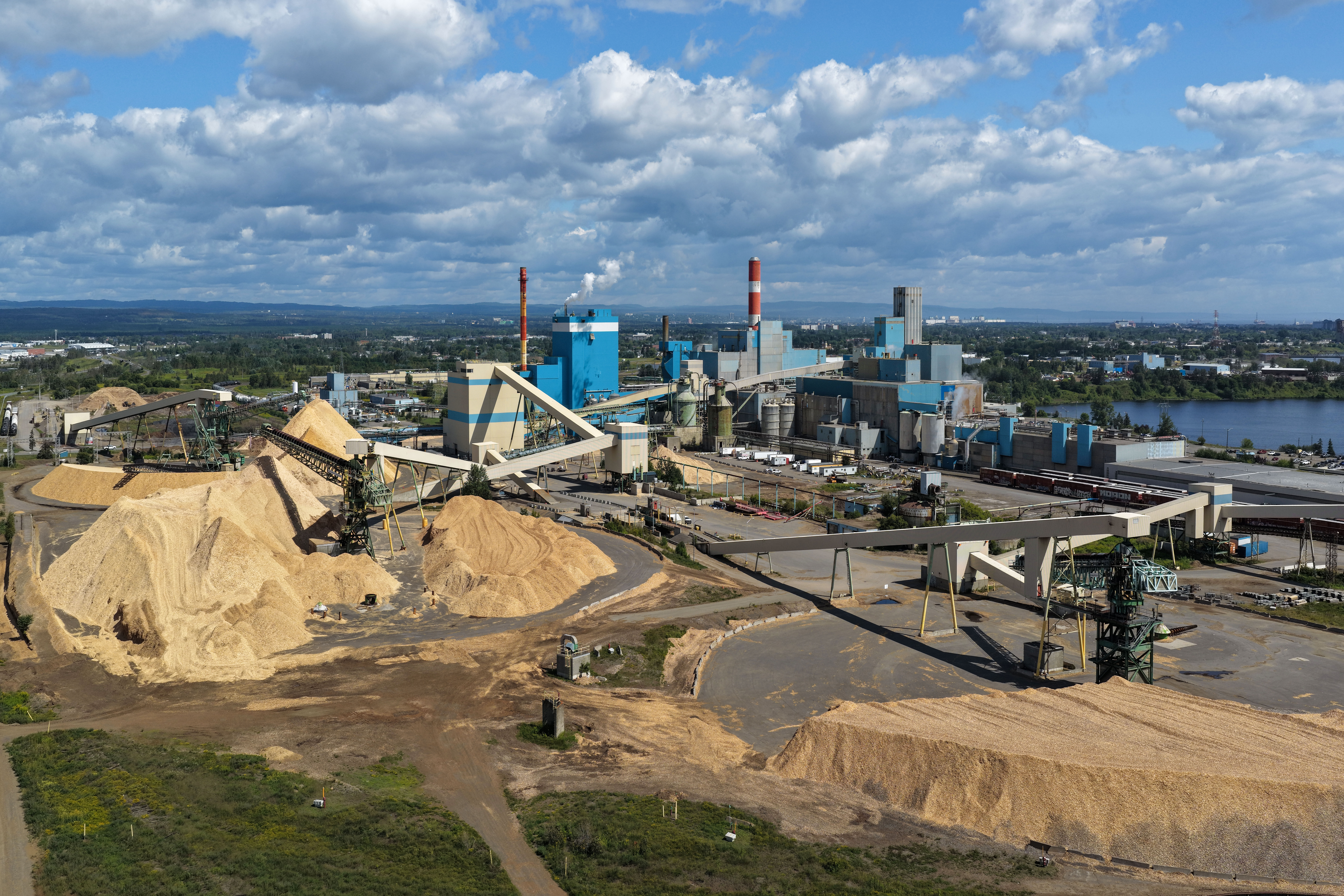
A Pulp and paper mill in Thunder Bay, Ontario

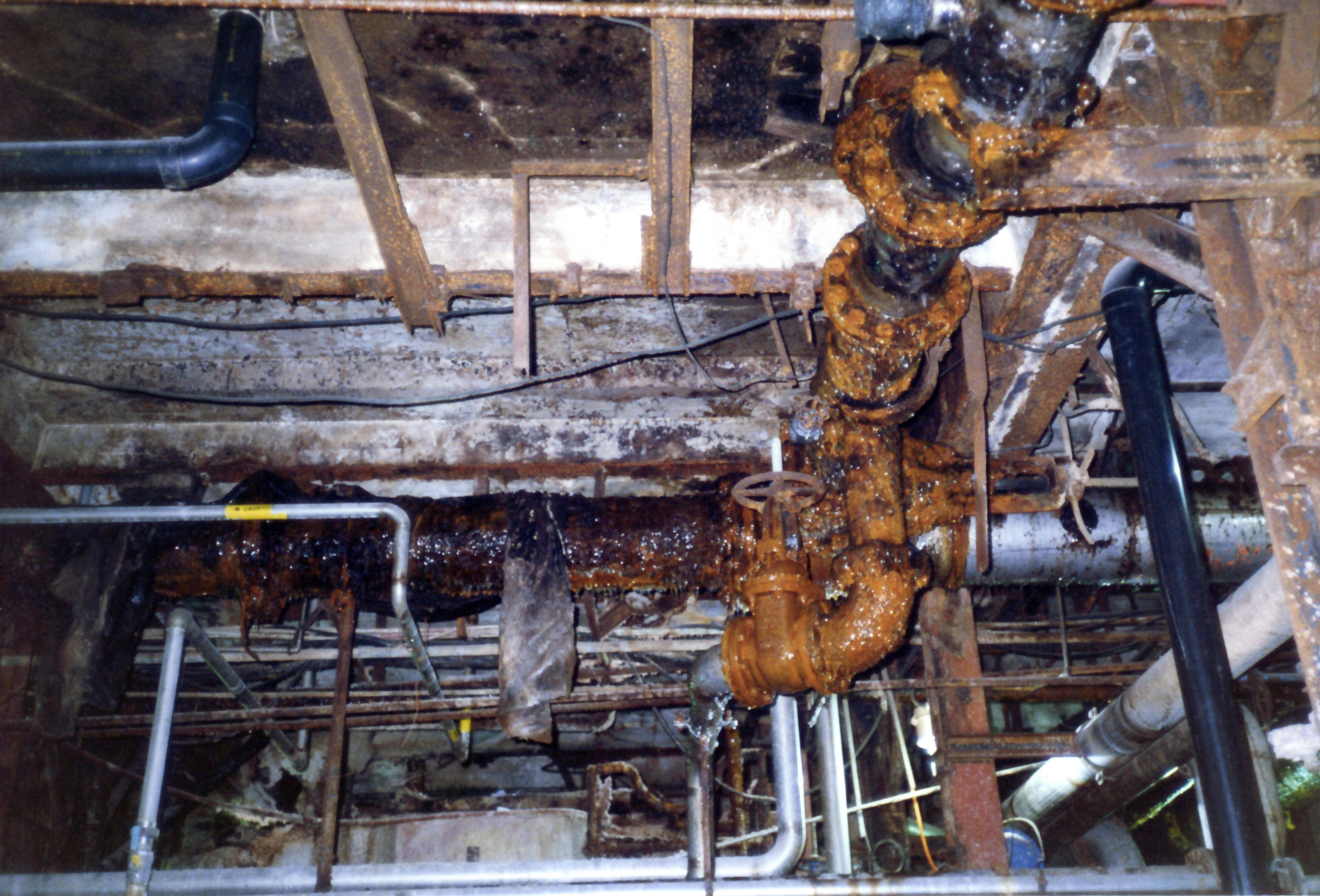
Basement of paper mill in Sault Ste. Marie, Ontario. Pulp and paper manufacture involves a great deal of humidity, which presents a preventive maintenance and corrosion challenge.

A paper mill is a factory devoted to making paper from vegetable fibers such as wood pulp, old rags, and other ingredients. Before the invention and adoption of the Fourdrinier machine and other types of paper machine that use an endless belt, all paper in a paper mill was made by hand, one sheet at a time, by specialized laborers.

== History ==
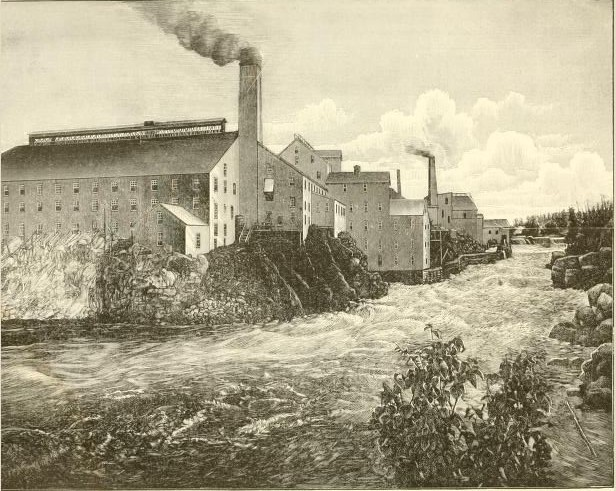
A mid-19th century paper mill, the Forest Fibre Company, in Berlin, New Hampshire

Historical investigations into the origin of the paper mill are complicated by differing definitions and loose terminology from modern authors: Many modern scholars use the term to refer indiscriminately to all kinds of mills, whether powered by humans, by animals, or by water. Their propensity to refer to any ancient paper manufacturing center as a "mill", without further specifying its exact power source, has increased the difficulty of identifying the particularly efficient and historically important water-powered type.

=== Human and animal-powered mills ===
The use of human and animal-powered mills was known to Muslim and Chinese papermakers. However, evidence for water-powered paper mills is elusive before the 11th century. The general absence of the use of water-powered paper mills in Muslim papermaking before the 11th century is suggested by the habit of Muslim authors at the time to call a production center not a "mill", but a "paper manufactory".

Scholars have identified paper mills in Abbasid-era Baghdad in 794–795. The evidence that waterpower was applied to papermaking at this time is a matter of scholarly debate. In the Moroccan city of Fez, Ibn Battuta speaks of "400 mill stones for paper". Since Ibn Battuta does not mention the use of waterpower and such some watermills would be grotesquely high, the passage is generally taken to refer to human or animal force.

=== Water-powered mills ===
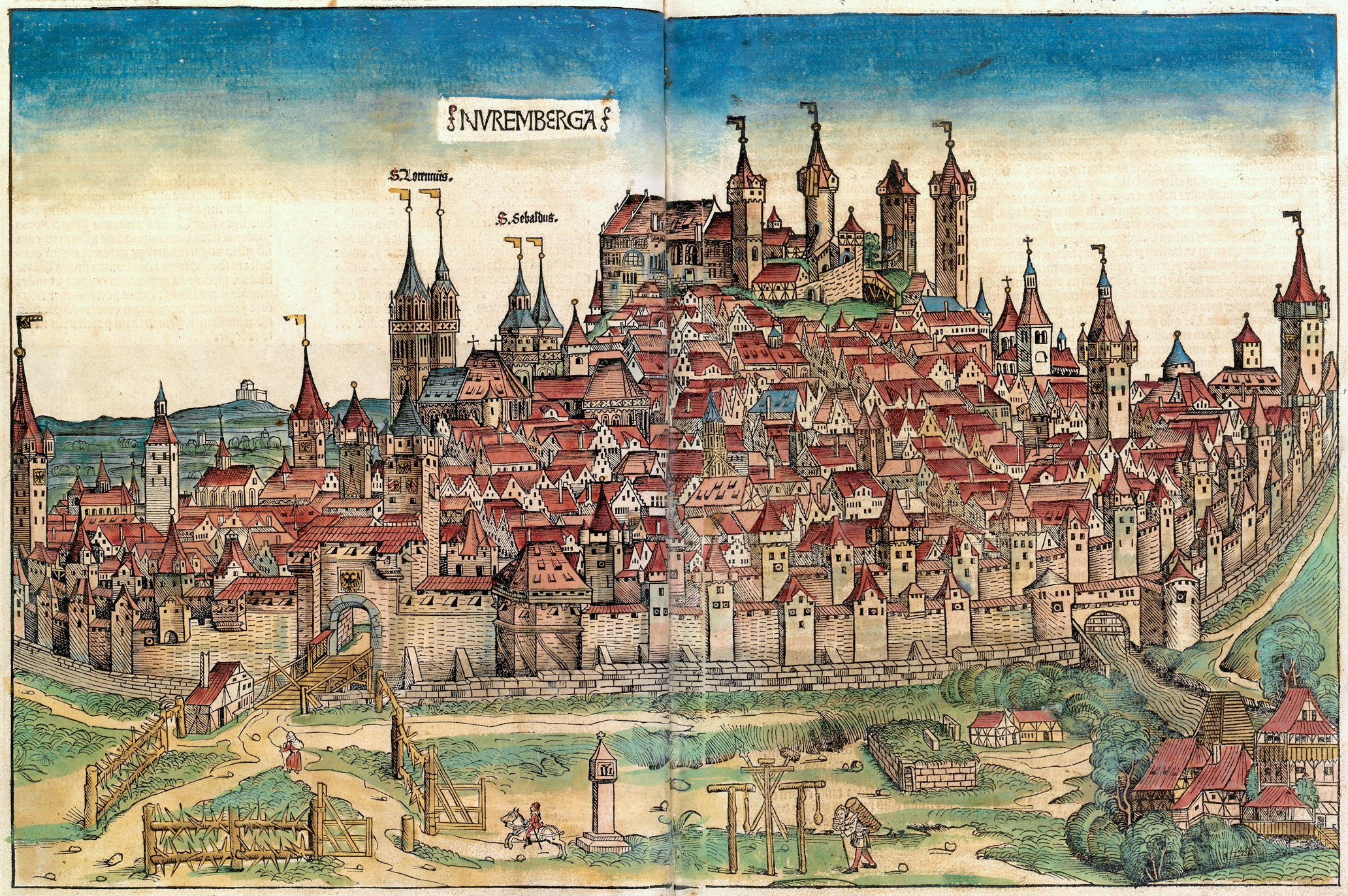
Stromer's paper mill, the building complex at the far right bottom, in the Nuremberg Chronicle of 1493. Due to their noise and smell, papermills were required by medieval law to be erected some distance from the city walls.

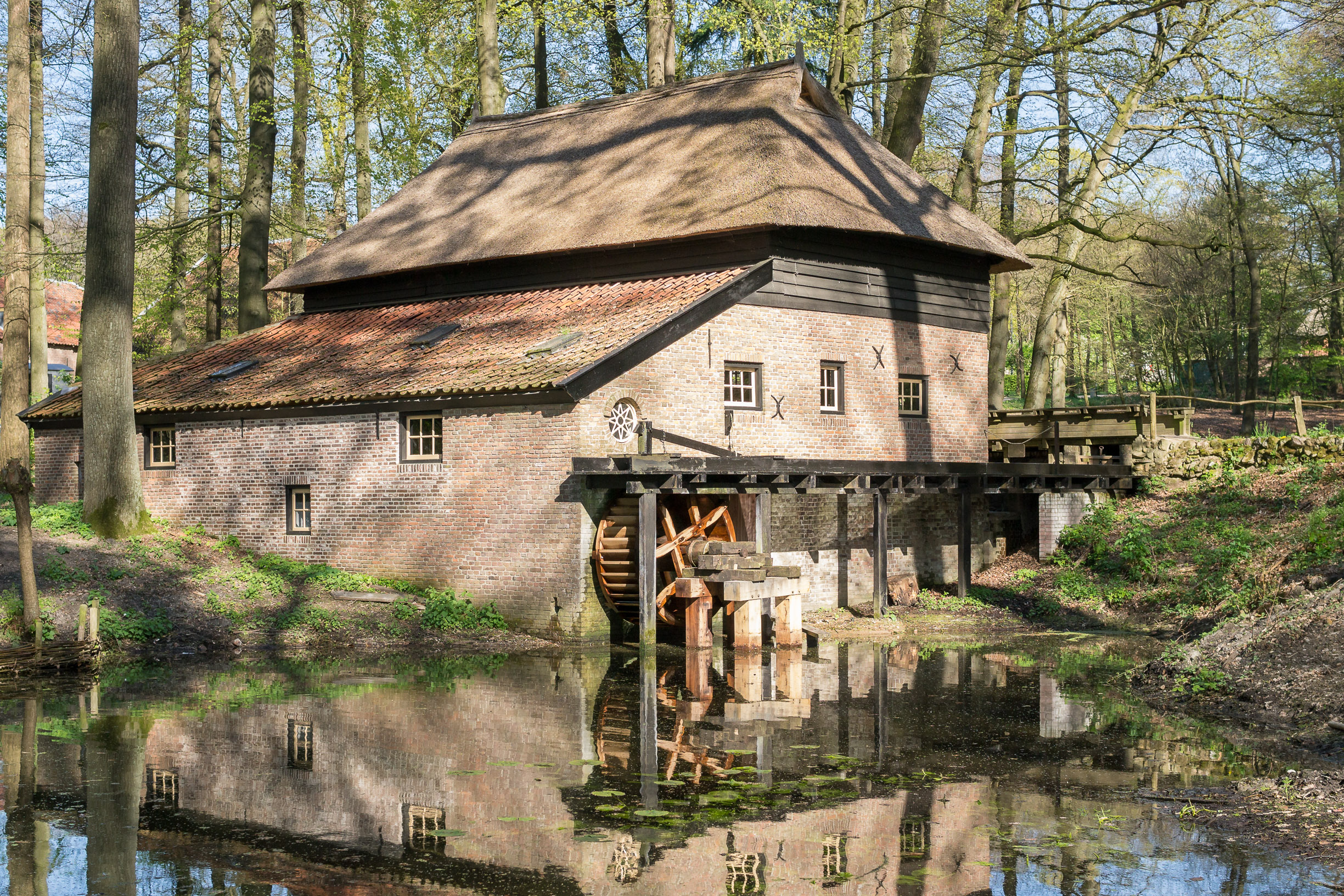
Dutch paper mill from 1654 in the Arnhem open-air museum

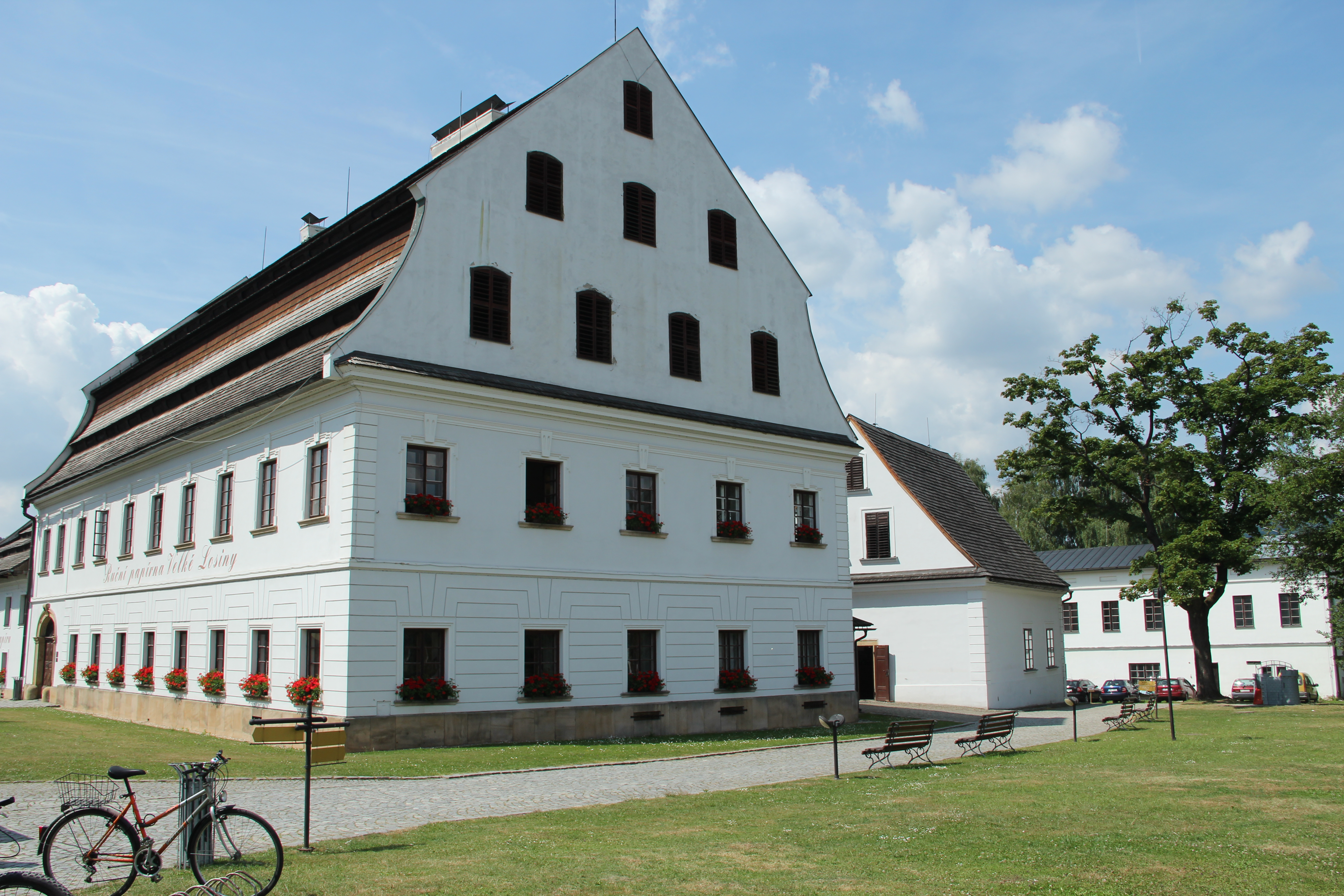
Paper Mill at Velké Losiny, established in 1596

An exhaustive survey of milling in Al-Andalus did not uncover water-powered paper mills, nor do the Spanish books of property distribution (Repartimientos) after the Christian reconquest refer to any. Arabic texts never use the term mill in connection with papermaking, and the most thorough account of Muslim papermaking at the time, the one by the Zirid Sultan Al-Muizz ibn Badis, describes the art purely in terms of a handicraft. Donald Hill has identified a possible reference to a water-powered paper mill in Samarkand, in the 11th-century work of the Persian scholar Abu Rayhan Biruni, but concludes that the passage is "too brief to enable us to say with certainty" that it refers to a water-powered paper mill. This is seen by Leor Halevi as evidence of Samarkand first harnessing waterpower in the production of paper, but notes that it is not known if waterpower was applied to papermaking elsewhere across the Islamic world at the time. Robert I. Burns remains sceptical, given the isolated occurrence of the reference and the prevalence of manual labour in Islamic papermaking elsewhere before the 13th century.

Hill notes that paper mills appear in early Christian Catalan documentation from the 1150s, which may imply Islamic origins, but that hard evidence is lacking. Burns, however, has dismissed the case for early Catalan water-powered paper mills, after re-examination of the evidence.

The identification of early hydraulic stamping mills in medieval documents from Fabriano, Italy, is also entirely unsubstantiated.

Clear evidence of a water-powered paper mill dates to 1282 in the Iberian Crown of Aragon. A decree by the Christian king Peter III addresses the establishment of a royal "molendinum", a proper hydraulic mill, in the paper manufacturing center of Xàtiva. This early hydraulic paper mill was operated by Muslims in the Moorish quarter of Xàtiva, though it appears to have been resented by sections of the local Muslim papermakering community; the document guarantees them the right to continue the way of traditional papermaking by beating the pulp manually and grants them the right to be exempted from work in the new mill.

At Toscolano Maderno, evidence for water-powered paper making dates from at least the late 14th century. Over the following centuries Toscolano would become a major paper producer.

The first permanent paper mill north of the Alps was established in Nuremberg by Ulman Stromer in 1390; it is later depicted in the lavishly illustrated Nuremberg Chronicle. From the mid-14th century onwards, European paper milling underwent a rapid improvement of many work processes.

The size of a paper mill before the use of industrial machines was measured by counting its vats. Thus, a "one vat" paper mill had only one vatman, one coucher, and other laborers.

=== 15th century ===
The invention and subsequent diffusion of Gutenberg's printing press across Europe increased demand for paper. This rising demand encouraged the development of techniques to produce thinner paper and the construction of more paper mills.

In 1453, the Basel Mill was converted into a paper mill.

By the late 15th century, paper mills were diffusing throughout Europe. An operational paper mill is recorded in Silesia by 1490, and the first paper mill in Poland was built in 1491 near Kraków. The first reference to a paper mill in England was in a book printed by Wynken de Worde c. 1495. The mill, near Hertford, was short-lived and belonged to John Tate. By the end of the 15th century, there were about 50 water-powered paper mills throughout German lands.

=== 16th century ===
The first known water-powered paper mill in China was recorded in 1570, during the Ming dynasty. In Muscovy, a 1576 land-sale document mentions a paper mill that had formerly stood on a river near Moscow. The first Dutch paper mill was erected in Dordrecht in 1586 by Hans van Aelst, a refugee from Antwerp, after which paper mills spread through the northern Low Countries. John Spilman received a patent to be the sole manufacturer of white paper in England and established a paper mill at Dartford, Kent, in 1588. By the late 1500s, there were roughly 190 paper mills throughout German lands.

=== 17th century ===
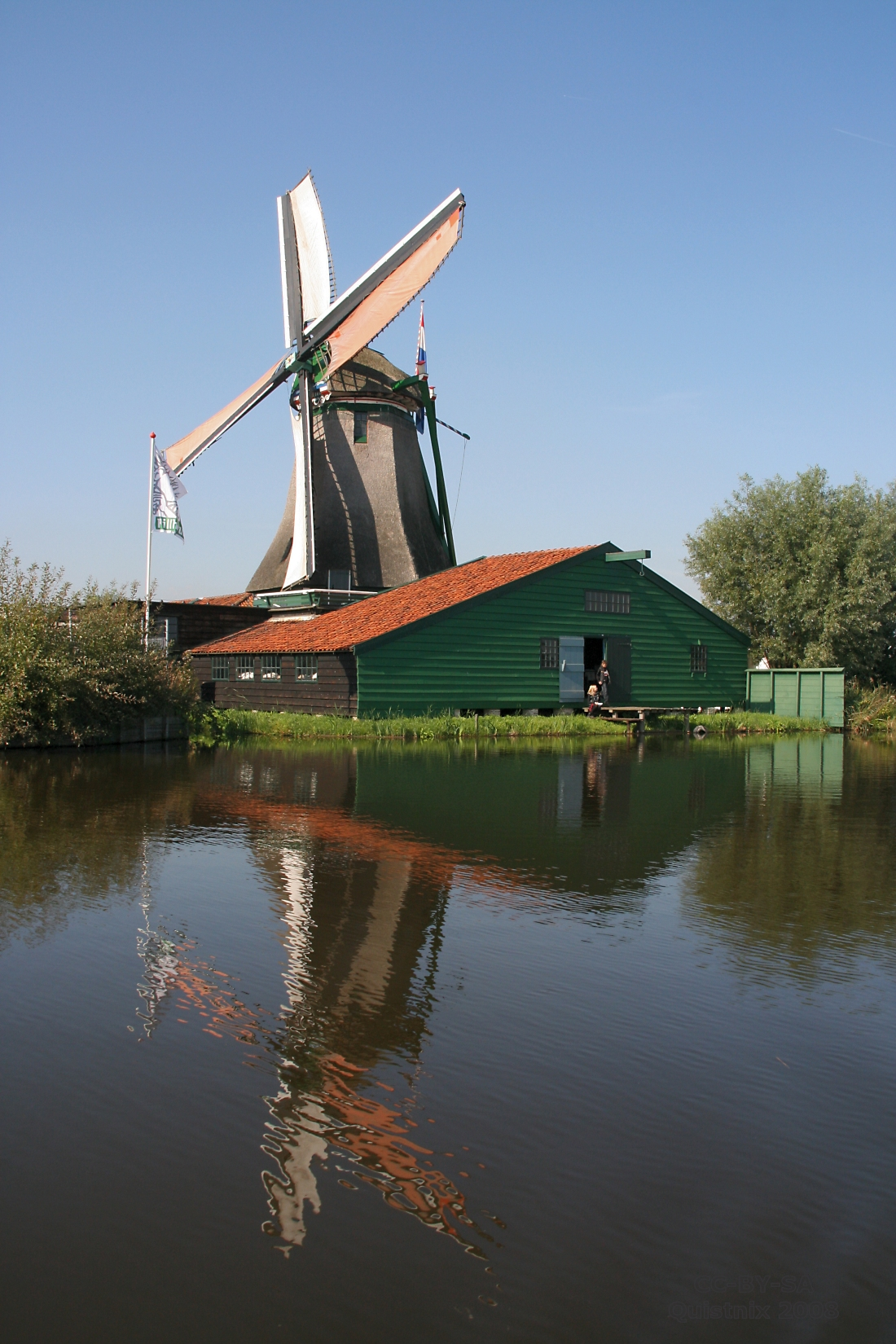
De Schoolmeester, a wind-powered paper mill built in 1692

The first paper mill along the Zaan is mentioned in 1605, although it was likely founded around 1601, and the region became an important center of wind-powered papermaking during the Dutch Golden Age. A major Dutch innovation was the Hollander beater, invented by an anonymous paper maker around 1680; it spread rapidly in the region over the following decades and greatly accelerated the reduction of rags into pulp. By the end of the 17th century, there were about forty paper mills in the Zaan region, all equipped with two or three beater tubs. The surviving paper windmill De Schoolmeester, built in 1692, is an example of this Zaan papermaking tradition.

In 1690, William Rittenhouse built the first paper mill in British North America near Germantown, Pennsylvania, on Monoshone Creek; its stamping machines were run by water power. For several decades, this would be the papermakers in British North America. By that same year the number of paper mills in England had grown to around 100.

=== 18th century ===
In 1740, the Dutch paper industry had roughly 150 mills in the Veluwe and 40 mills in the Zaanstreek, together producing about 3,750 tons of paper annually.

The first clearly documented Ottoman water-powered paper mill was established at Yalova in 1744 by İbrahim Müteferrika.

Around 1755, James Whatman developed wove paper at Turkey Mill in England, a major development in the production of smoother paper for printing and art.

Paper milling expanded in the Philadelphia region during the 18th century. By 1769 there were 26 paper mills in the thirteen colonies, 20 of them in the Philadelphia area; by 1775 there were 53 small-scale paper mills in the colonies, though domestic production still failed to meet demand during the American Revolution.

An early known paper mill to use steam power was Wilmington Mill in Holderness, England, where a Watt engine was installed in 1787.

=== 19th century ===
By 1800, England alone possessed nearly 400 paper mills.

An early attempt to mechanize the process was patented in 1799 by the Frenchman Nicholas Louis Robert; it was not deemed a success. In 1801, however, the drawings were brought to England by John Gamble and passed on to brothers Henry and Sealy Fourdrinier, who financed the engineer Bryan Donkin to construct the machine. Their first successful machine was installed at Frogmore Mill in Hertfordshire in 1803.

In 1809, at Apsley Mill, John Dickinson patented and installed another kind of paper machine. Rather than pouring a dilute pulp suspension onto an endlessly revolving flat wire, this machine used a wire-covered cylinder as the mould. A cylindrical mould is partially submerged in the vat, containing a pulp suspension. Then, as the mould rotates, the water is sucked through the wire, leaving a thin layer of fibers deposited on the cylinder. These cylinder-mold machines, as they were called, were strong competition for Fourdrinier machine makers. They were the type of machine first used by the North American paper industry. It is estimated that by 1850, UK paper production had reached 100,000 tons. Later developments increased the size and capacity of machines and sought high-volume alternative pulp sources from which paper could be reliably produced. Many of the earlier mills were small and had been located in rural areas. The movement was toward larger mills in or near urban areas, closer to their raw material suppliers. They were often situated near a port, where the raw material was brought in by ship, and near paper markets. By the end of the century, there were fewer than 300 UK paper mills, employing 35,000 people and producing 650,000 tons of paper per year.

Growing paper consumption in the eighteenth and nineteenth centuries strained the traditional reliance on linen and cotton rags. Rising worldwide demand made rags scarcer and more expensive, encouraging papermakers to seek cheaper and more abundant alternatives. Wood pulp became increasingly important after groundwood pulp was first made in Germany in 1840, though the process did not come into extensive use until about 1870.

Another industrial improvement was the development of the conical refiner, also called the Jordan refiner. Patented in the United States in 1858 by Joseph Jordan Jr. and Thomas Eustice, the machine used a conical grinder and outer shell to reduce and size paper pulp. Refiners did not immediately eliminate beaters, especially for rag papers, but conical and disc refiners later largely replaced beaters in stock-preparation systems because they were more compact and efficient for comparable production.

=== 20th century ===
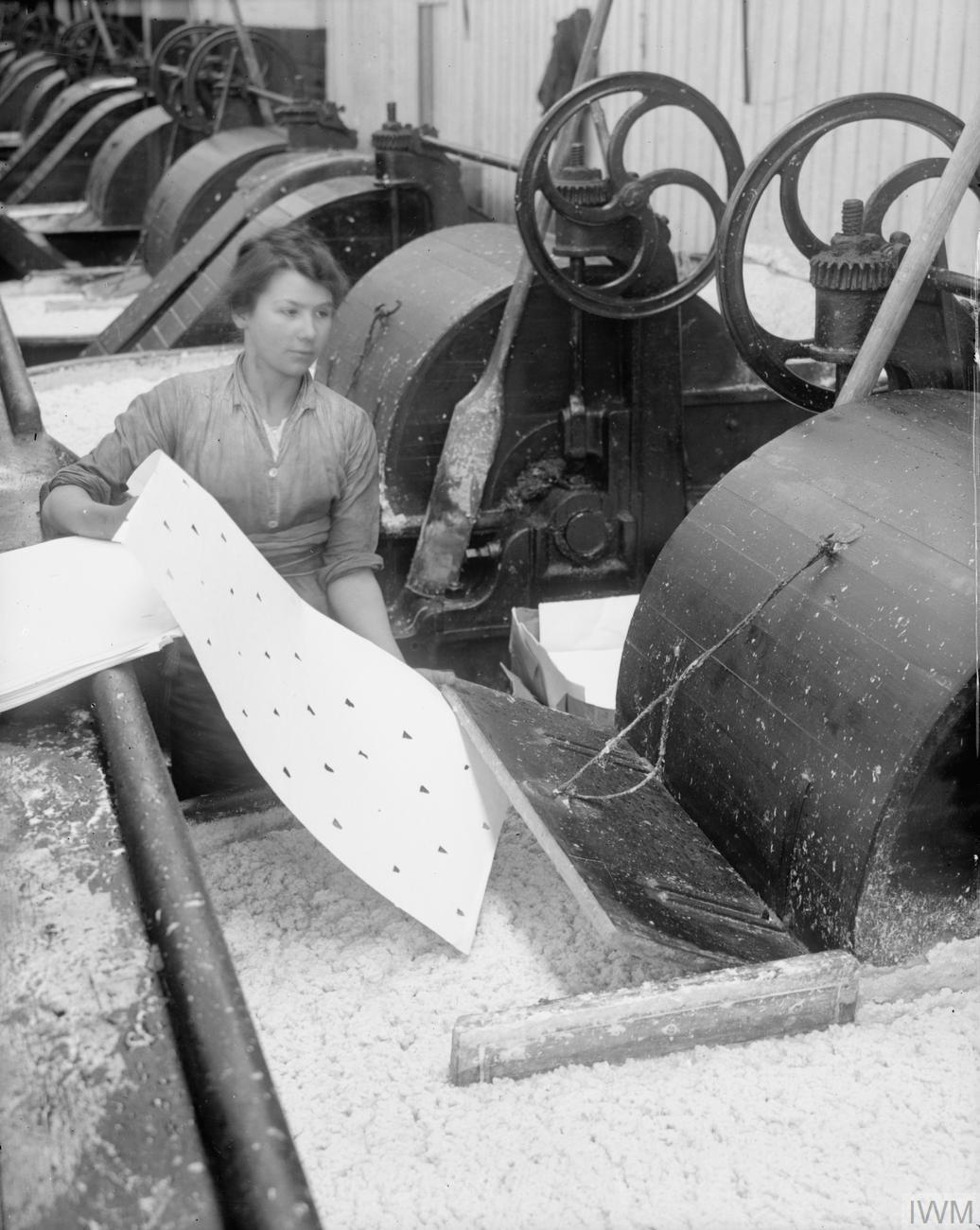
A paper mill in Scotland, 1918

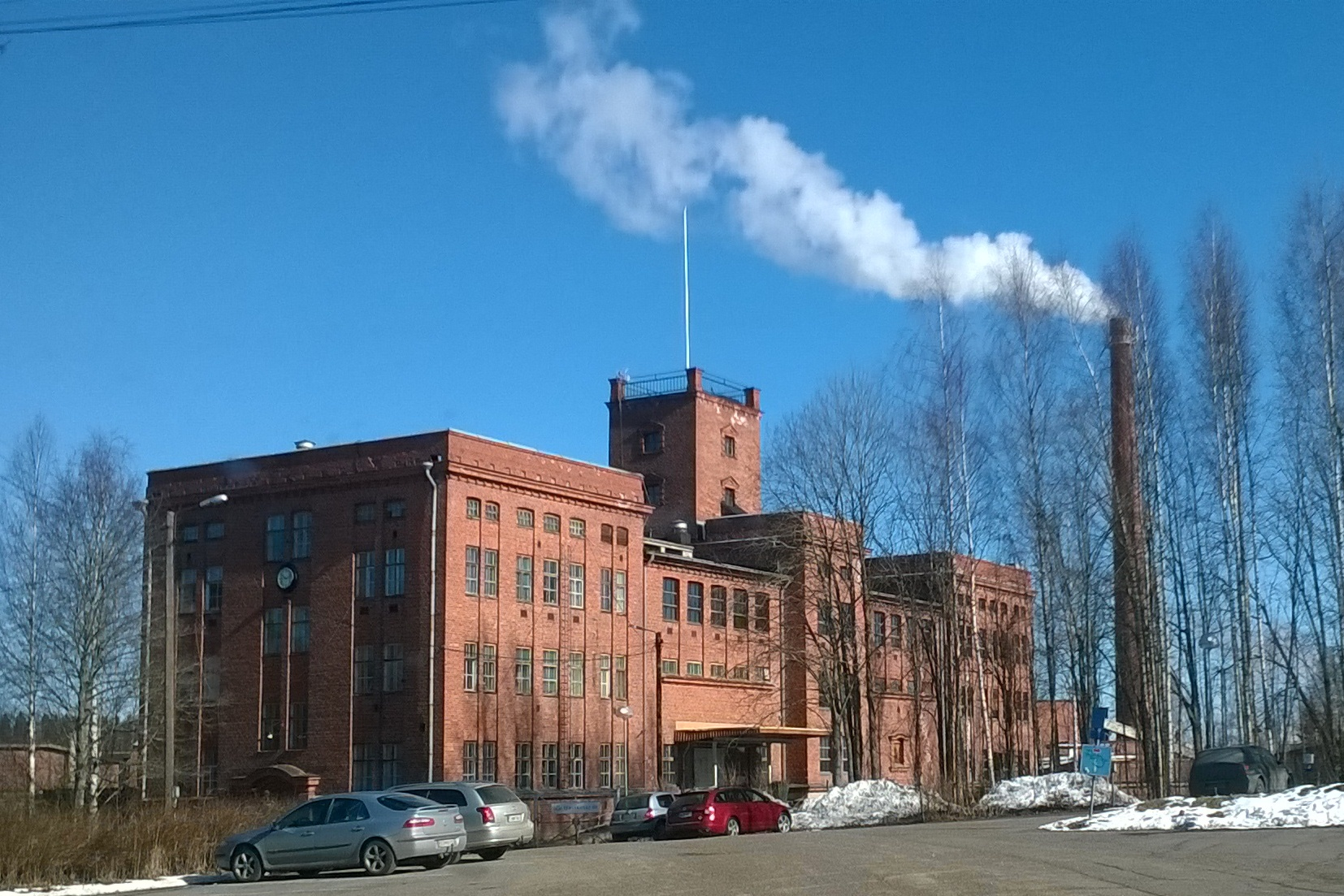
The Tervakoski Paper Mill in Tervakoski, Janakkala, Finland

By the early 20th century, paper mills sprang up across New England and around the world, driven by high demand for paper. The United States, with its infrastructure and mill towns, was the world's largest producer. Chief among these in paper production was Holyoke, Massachusetts, which was the largest producer of paper in the world by 1885, and home to engineers D. H. & A. B. Tower who oversaw the largest firm of paper millwrights in the US during that decade, designing mills on five continents. However, as 20th century progressed this diaspora moved further north and west in the United States, with access to greater pulp supplies and labor. At this time, there were many world leaders of the production of paper; one such was the Brown Company in Berlin, New Hampshire run by William Wentworth Brown. During the year 1907, the Brown Company cut between 30 and 40 million acres of woodlands on their property, which extended from La Tuque, Quebec, Canada to West Palm, Florida.

In the 1920s, Nancy Baker Tompkins represented large paper manufacturers, such as Hammermill Paper Company, Honolulu Paper Company, and Appleton Coated Paper Company, to promote sales to paper product distributors. It was said to be the only business of its kind in the world, and it was founded in 1931 by Tompkins. It prospered despite the business depression.

"Log drives" were conducted on local rivers to send the logs to the mills. By the late 20th and early 21st century, paper mills began to close, and the log drives became a dying craft. Due to the addition of new machinery, many millworkers were laid off, and many of the historic paper mills closed.

== Characteristics ==
Paper mills can be either fully integrated or non-integrated. Integrated mills consist of a pulp mill and a paper mill on the same site. Such mills receive logs or wood chips and produce paper.

The modern paper mill uses energy, water, and wood pulp in an efficient, complex series of processes and control technology to produce a sheet of paper that can be used in diverse ways. Modern paper machines can be 150 metres (500 ft) in length, produce a sheet 10 metres (400 in) wide, and operate at speeds of more than 97 kilometres per hour (60 mph). The two main suppliers of paper machines are Metso and Voith.

== See also ==
- Cutting stock problem
- List of paper mills
- Paper pollution
- Sawmill

== Sources ==
- Burns, Robert I. (1996), "Paper comes to the West, 800−1400", in Lindgren, Uta (ed.), Europäische Technik im Mittelalter. 800 bis 1400. Tradition und Innovation (4th ed.), Berlin: Gebr. Mann Verlag, pp. 413–422, ISBN 3-7861-1748-9
- Hunter, Dard (1930), Papermaking through Eighteen Centuries, New York
- Hunter, Dard (1943), Papermaking: The History and Technique of an Ancient Craft, New York
- Lucas, Adam Robert (2005), "Industrial Milling in the Ancient and Medieval Worlds. A Survey of the Evidence for an Industrial Revolution in Medieval Europe", Technology and Culture, 46 (1): 1–30, doi:10.1353/tech.2005.0026, S2CID 109564224
- Thompson, Susan (1978), "Paper Manufacturing and Early Books", Annals of the New York Academy of Sciences, 314 (1): 167–176, Bibcode:1978NYASA.314..167T, doi:10.1111/j.1749-6632.1978.tb47791.x, S2CID 85153174
- Tschudin, Peter F. (1996), "Werkzeug und Handwerkstechnik in der mittelalterlichen Papierherstellung", in Lindgren, Uta (ed.), Europäische Technik im Mittelalter. 800 bis 1400. Tradition und Innovation (4th ed.), Berlin: Gebr. Mann Verlag, pp. 423–428, ISBN 3-7861-1748-9
- Stromer, Wolfgang von (1960), "Das Handelshaus der Stromer von Nürnberg und die Geschichte der ersten deutschen Papiermühle", Vierteljahrschrift für Sozial und Wirtschaftsgeschichte, 47: 81–104
- Stromer, Wolfgang von (1993), "Große Innovationen der Papierfabrikation in Spätmittelalter und Frühneuzeit", Technikgeschichte, 60 (1): 1–6
- "Schätze des Westerzgebirges und seines Umlandes - Zur kurzen Ära des Tangentialschliffes" (PDF). Papiergeschichte. Wochenblatt für Papierfabrikation (in German). No. 9. September 2016. pp. 612–616. Archived (PDF) from the original on 2023-06-08.
- Tsien, Tsuen-Hsuin: "Science and Civilisation in China", Chemistry and Chemical Technology (Vol. 5), Paper and Printing (Part 1), Cambridge University Press, 1985
