= Hamlet's Mill =

1969 book on archaeoastronomy and mythology

Hamlet's Mill: An Essay Investigating the Origins of Human Knowledge and Its Transmission Through Myth
- 1st hardcover edition, dust cover art
- Author: Giorgio de Santillana, Hertha von Dechend
- Cover artist: William Barss (1st hardcover edition, Gambit, 1969); Sara Eisenman (1st paperback edition, 1977)
- Language: English
- Subject: Mythology and Astronomy
- Publisher: Gambit Incorporated (1969, hardcover, 1st edition, 1st printing); Harvard University Press (1969, hardcover); David R. Godine, Publisher, Inc. (1977, softcover)
- Publication date: November 1969
- Publication place: United States
- Media type: Print (Hardback & Paperback)
- Pages: 505 (1st paperback edition; includes the 25 chapters, 39 appendices, bibliography and indices)
- ISBN: 0-87645-008-7 (Harvard); LCCN 69013267 (Gambit); ISBN 978-0-87923-215-3 (Godine)

Hamlet's Mill: An Essay on Myth & the Frame of Time (first published by Gambit Inc., Boston, 1969), later Hamlet's Mill: An Essay Investigating the Origins of Human Knowledge and Its Transmission Through Myth, by Giorgio de Santillana, a professor of the history of science at the Massachusetts Institute of Technology in Cambridge, MA, US, and Hertha von Dechend, a professor of the history of science at Johann Wolfgang Goethe-Universität in Frankfurt, Germany, is a nonfiction work on the history of science and comparative mythology, particularly in the subfield of archaeoastronomy. It is primarily about the possibility of a Neolithic era or earlier discovery of axial precession and the transmission of that knowledge in mythology.

Santillana's academic colleague Nathan Sivin described the book as "an end run around those scholarly custodians of the history of early astronomy who consider myths best ignored, and those ethnologists who consider astronomy best ignored, to arouse public enthusiasm for exploration into the astronomical content of myth." The book was sharply criticized by other academics upon its publication.

== Argument ==
The main theses of the book include (1) a late Neolithic or earlier discovery of the precession of the equinoxes, (2) an associated long-lived megalith-building late Neolithic civilization that made astronomical observations sufficient for that discovery in the Near East, and (3) that the knowledge of this civilization about precession and the associated astrological ages was encoded in mythology, typically in the form of a story relating to a millstone and a young protagonist. This last thesis gives the book its title, "Hamlet's Mill", by reference to the kenning Amlóða kvern recorded in the Old Icelandic Skáldskaparmál. The authors claim that this mythology is primarily to be interpreted in terms of archaeoastronomy and they reject, and in fact mock, alternative interpretations in terms of fertility or agriculture.

The book's project is an examination of the "relics, fragments and allusions that have survived the steep attrition of the ages". In particular, the book centers on the mytheme of a heavenly mill which rotates around the celestial pole and is associated with the maelstrom and the Milky Way. The authors argue for the pervasiveness of their hypothetical civilization's astronomical ideas by selecting and comparing elements of global mythology in light of hypothetical shared astronomical symbolism, especially among heavenly mill myths, heavenly milk-churn myths, celestial succession myths, and flood myths. Their sources include African myths collected by Marcel Griaule, the Persian epic Shahnameh, the Classical mythology of Plato, Pindar, and Plutarch, the Finnish epic Kalevala, the eddas of Norse mythology, the Hindu Mahabharata, Vedas, and Upanishads, Babylonian astrology, and the Sumerian Gilgamesh and King List.

Santillana and Dechend state in their introduction to Hamlet's Mill that they are well aware of contrasting modern interpretations of myth and folklore but find them shallow and lacking insight: "...the experts now are benighted by the current folk fantasy, which is the belief that they are beyond all this – critics without nonsense and extremely wise". Consequently, Santillana and Dechend prefer to rely on the work of "meticulous scholars such as Ideler, Lepsius, Chwolson, Boll and, to go farther back, of Athanasius Kircher and Petavius..." They continue to argue throughout the book for preferring the work of earlier scholars and of the early mythologists themselves in contrast to the work of their closer contemporaries.

== Origins ==
The book's two authors, Giorgio de Santillana and Hertha von Dechend, met at a symposium in Frankfurt, Germany, in 1958, and they began to collaborate on the work that became Hamlet's Mill in 1959 after Santillana was inspired by von Dechend's original research shared with him in 1959. At the time, Santillana was a professor at the Massachusetts Institute of Technology while von Dechend was formally a professor at Johann Wolfgang Goethe University, but in practice a researcher without a pension. During the time of writing between 1959 and 1969, Santillana became seriously ill in the mid-1960s, leading at least one reviewer to see the book as inspired by Santillana, but more substantially written by von Dechend.

Both authors had prior interests and influences that were identified by contemporary reviewers as important features of the finished book. Von Dechend's training with Leo Frobenius at his Frankfurt Museum of Ethnology 1934–1938 was emphasized by critical reviewer Edmund Leach, Santillana's prior interests in the earliest roots of rationalism as in his The Origins of Scientific Thought (1961) were emphasized by critical reviewer Lynn White, Jr., and the authors' personal concerns with the problems of sustaining humanism against political and technological dogmatism were highlighted by positive reviewers.

The Origins of Scientific Thought anticipated Hamlet's Mill's arguments as in this quotation: "We can see then, how so many myths, fantastic and arbitrary in semblance, of which the Greek tale of the Argonaut is a late offspring, may provide a terminology of image motifs, a kind of code which is beginning to be broken. It was meant to allow those who knew (a) to determine unequivocally the position of given planets in respect to the earth, to the firmament, and to one another; (b) to present what knowledge there was of the fabric of the world in the form of tales about 'how the world began'."

The two authors' shared concern with supporting humanism against political and technological dogmatism has been attributed to the authors' shared lessons from European fascism in the lead-up to World War II, von Dechend under the Nazi Party in Frankfurt and Santillana under the Mussolini government in Rome, Italy. Santillana's prior work The Case of Galileo had been a study of the institutional persecution dynamics in Galileo Galilei's trial by the Catholic Church, for instance, which its reviewers connected to his experiences of Fascist Italy and of McCarthyism in the US, and Santillana had written publicly in support of J. Robert Oppenheimer after the Oppenheimer security clearance hearing in "Galileo and J. Robert Oppenheimer" (The Reporter, December 26, 1957).

Both Santillana and von Dechend were known for responding to persecution with esotericism, as their colleagues classicist and political philosopher Leo Strauss and historian of science Alexandre Koyré had each written about in Persecution and the Art of Writing (1952) and "The Political Function of the Modern Lie" (The Contemporary Jewish Record, 1945), respectively. Positive reviewer Philip Morrison noted this esotericism as a crucial influence on the arguments of Hamlet's Mill.

== Reception ==
Hamlet's Mill was severely criticized by notable academic reviewers on a number of grounds: tenuous arguments based on incorrect or outdated linguistic information; lack of familiarity with modern sources; an over-reliance on coincidence or analogy; and the general implausibility of a far-flung and influential civilization existing and not leaving behind solid evidence. Thus, Jaan Puhvel (1970) concluded that

This is not a serious scholarly work on the problem of myth in the closing decades of the twentieth century. There are frequent flashes of insight, for example, on the cyclical world views of the ancients and on the nature of mythical language, as well as genuinely eloquent, quasi-poetic homilies.

Writing in The New York Review of Books, Edmund Leach (1970) noted:

[The] authors' insistence that between about 4000 B.C. and 100 A.D. a single archaic system prevailed throughout most of the civilized and proto-civilized world is pure fantasy. Their attempt to delineate the details of this system by a worldwide scatter of random oddments of mythology is no more than an intellectual game. [...] Something like 60 percent of the text is made up of complex arguments about Indo-European etymologies which would have seemed old-fashioned as early as 1870.

H. R. Ellis Davidson (1974) referred to Hamlet’s Mill as:

[...] amateurish in the worst sense, jumping to wild conclusions without any knowledge of the historical value of the sources or of previous work done. On the Scandinavian side there is heavy dependence on the fantasies of Rydberg, writing in the last [19th] century, and apparent ignorance of progress made since his time.

In contrast, others praised Hamlet's Mill. The astrophysicist Philip Morrison, a friend of Santillana's, began with criticism but concluded "here is a book for the wise, however it may appear," for a review in Scientific American. Another colleague of Santillana's, classical scholar Harald Reiche, also reviewed Hamlet's Mill positively. Reiche further went on to develop archaeoastronomical interpretations of ancient myth in a series of lectures and publications similarly to Hamlet's Mill, though dealing more specifically with Greek mythology, that included an interpretation of "the layout of Atlantis as a sort of map of the sky", published as a chapter in Astronomy of the Ancients (1979), with an introduction by Morrison. Others recommended the book for the controversy it had stirred.

The Swedish astronomer Peter Nilson, while stating that Hamlet's Mill is not a work of science, expressed admiration for it and credited it as a source of inspiration when he wrote his own book on classic mythologies based on the night sky: Himlavalvets sällsamheter (1977).

Barber & Barber's When They Severed Earth from Sky: How the Human Mind Shapes Myth (2004), itself a study aiming to "uncover seismic, geological, astrological, or other natural events" from mythology, appreciated the book for its pioneer work in mythography, judging that "although controversial, [Santillana and von Dechend] have usefully flagged and collected Herculean amounts of relevant data."

== Publishing history ==
The full hardcover title is Hamlet's Mill: An Essay on Myth & the Frame of Time. Later softcover editions would use Hamlet's Mill: An Essay Investigating the Origins of Human Knowledge and its Transmission Through Myth. The English edition was assembled and published five years prior to Santillana's death. Hertha von Dechend prepared an expanded second edition several years later. The essay was reissued by David R. Godine, Publisher in 1992. The German translation, which appeared in 1993, is slightly longer than the original. The 8th Italian edition of 2000 was expanded from 552 to 630 pages.

- First English paperback edition: Boston: Godine, 1977
- Italian editions: Giorgio de Santillana, Hertha von Dechend, Il mulino di Amleto. Saggio sul mito e sulla struttura del tempo (Milan: Adelphi, 1983, 552 pages). Giorgio de Santillana, Hertha von Dechend, Il mulino di Amleto. Saggio sul mito e sulla struttura del tempo (Milan: Adelphi, 2000, 8th expanded Italian edition, 630 pages)
- German edition: Giorgio de Santillana, Hertha von Dechend: Die Mühle des Hamlet. Ein Essay über Mythos und das Gerüst der Zeit (Berlin : Kammerer und Unverzagt, 1993. ISBN 3-926763-23-X)
- French edition: Giorgio de Santillana; Hertha von Dechend, Claude Gaudriault (tr.) Le moulin d'Hamlet : la connaissance, origine et transmission par les mythes (Paris : Editions Edite, 2012)

== See also ==
- Charles François Dupuis
- Geomythology
- The Masks of God
- World Mill

== Bibliography ==
- Barber, Elizabeth Wayland; Barber, Paul T. (2006). When They Severed Earth from Sky: How the Human Mind Shapes Myth. Princeton University Press. ISBN 978-0-691-12774-3.
- Barthel, Thomas S. (1974). "Reviewed Work: Hamlet's Mill. An essay on myth and the frame of time by Giorgio de Santillana, Hertha von Dechend". Zeitschrift für Ethnologie (in German). 99 (1/2): 284–287. JSTOR 25841479.
- Davidson, H. R. Ellis (1974). "Reviewed Work: Hamlet's Mill by Giorgio de Santillana, Hertha von Dechend". Folklore. 85 (4): 282–283. JSTOR 1259630.
- Feyerabend, Paul (2000). Against Method (3rd ed.). London: Verso. ISBN 0-86091-481-X.
- Gresseth, Gerald K. (1971). "Reviewed Work: Hamlet's Mill: An Essay on Myth and the Frame of Time by Giorgio de Santillana, Hertha von Dechend". The Journal of American Folklore. 84 (332): 246–247. doi:10.2307/538998. JSTOR 538998.
- Heggie, Douglas C. (1980). "Reviewed Work: Astronomy of the Ancients. Edited by Kenneth Brecher and Michael Feirtag". Journal for the History of Astronomy. 11 (Archaeoastronomy Supplement): S99–S101.
- Leach, Edmund R. (February 12, 1970). "Bedtime Story; Reviewed: Hamlet's Mill by Giorgio de Santillana and Hertha von Dechend". The New York Review of Books.
- Lindgren, Uta (2003). "Eloge: Hertha von Dechend, 1915–2001". Isis. 94 (1): 112–113. doi:10.1086/376103. JSTOR 10.1086/376103.
- Mattingly, Garrett (1955). "Reviewed Work: The Crime of Galileo. by Giorgio de Santillana". Political Science Quarterly. 70 (4): 600–601. doi:10.2307/2145581. JSTOR 2145581.
- Morrison, Philip (1969). "Reviewed Work: Hamlet's Mill: An Essay on Myth and the Frame of Time by de Santillana, Giorgio, and von Dechend, Hertha". Scientific American. 221 (5): 159. JSTOR 24964354.
- Payne-Gaposchkin, Cecilia (1972). "Essay Review: Myth and Science: Hamlet's Mill". Journal for the History of Astronomy. 3 (3): 206–211. doi:10.1177/002182867200300306.
- Puhvel, Jaan (1 December 1970). "Hamlet's Mill. An Essay on Myth and the Frame of Time". Reviews of Books. The American Historical Review. 75 (7): 2009–2010. doi:10.1086/ahr/75.7.2009. JSTOR 1848027.
- de Santillana, Giorgio; von Dechend, Hertha (1977). Hamlet's Mill: An Essay Investigating the Origins of Human Knowledge and Its Transmission Through Myth (paperback ed.). Godine. ISBN 978-0-87923-215-3. LCCN 69-13267.
- Reiche, Harald A. T. (1973). "Reviewed Work: Hamlet's Mill. An Essay on Myth and the Frame of Time by Giorgio De Santillana, Hertha Von Dechend". The Classical Journal. 69 (1): 81–83. JSTOR 3295731.
- Roux, J.-P. (1971). "Reviewed Work: Hamlet's Mill. — An Essay on Myth & the Frame of Time by Giorgio de Santillana, Hertha Von Dechend". Revue de l'histoire des religions (in French). 180 (2): 216–217. JSTOR 23668069.
- Sivin, N. (1976). "Éloge: Giorgio Diaz de Santillana, 1902–1974". Isis. 67 (3): 439–443. JSTOR 230683.
- White, Jr., Lynn (1970). "Reviewed Work: Hamlet's Mill. An Essay on Myth and the Frame of Time by Giorgio de Santillana, Hertha von Dechend". Isis. 61 (4): 540–541. doi:10.1086/350690. JSTOR 229468.
