= Harald Reiche =

German-American classical scholar (1922–1994)

Harald Reiche (1922 Germany – 1994 Massachusetts) was a German-American classical scholar, specializing in an archaeoastronomical interpretation of Greek mythology.

He received a B.A. degree in classics from Harvard University in 1943, followed by an M.A. (1944) and Ph.D. (1955). Reiche became Professor of Classics and Philosophy at MIT in 1966. In the late 1960s with his colleague Giorgio de Santillana, Reiche pioneered the theory ancient myths were invented to serve as "vehicles for memorizing and transmitting certain kinds of astronomical and cosmological information". Reiche was one of the few academics to positively review Santillana's Hamlet's Mill (1969) which was widely criticized.

In 1979, Reiche offered an archaeoastronomical reading of Plato's Atlantis story. A fairly negative review appeared in the Journal for the History of Astronomy the following year, noting it is "difficult to decide how seriously to take the long article by Reiche who interprets the layout of Atlantis as a sort of map of the sky".

== Publications ==
- Empedocles' Mixture, Eudoxan Astronomy and Aristotle's Connate. (1960). A.M. Hakkert.
- "Myth and Magic in Cosmological Polemics: Plato, Aristotle, Lucretius". (1971). Rheinisches Museum für Philologie. 114(4): 296–329.
- "The Language of Archaic Astronomy: A Clue to the Atlantis Myth?" (1979). In: Astronomy of the Ancients, ed. Brecher, K., and Feirtag, M. Cambridge, Mass (MIT Press): 155–89.
- "Archaic Heritage: Myths of Decline and End in Antiquity". (1985). In: Visions of Apocalypse: End or Rebirth?, ed. Friedlander, S. et al. New York: Holmes and Meier: 21–43.
- "Heraclides' Three Soul-Gates: Plato Revised". (1993). Transactions of the American Philological Association. 123: 161–180.
