= Hollander beater =

Dutch machine to produce paper pulp

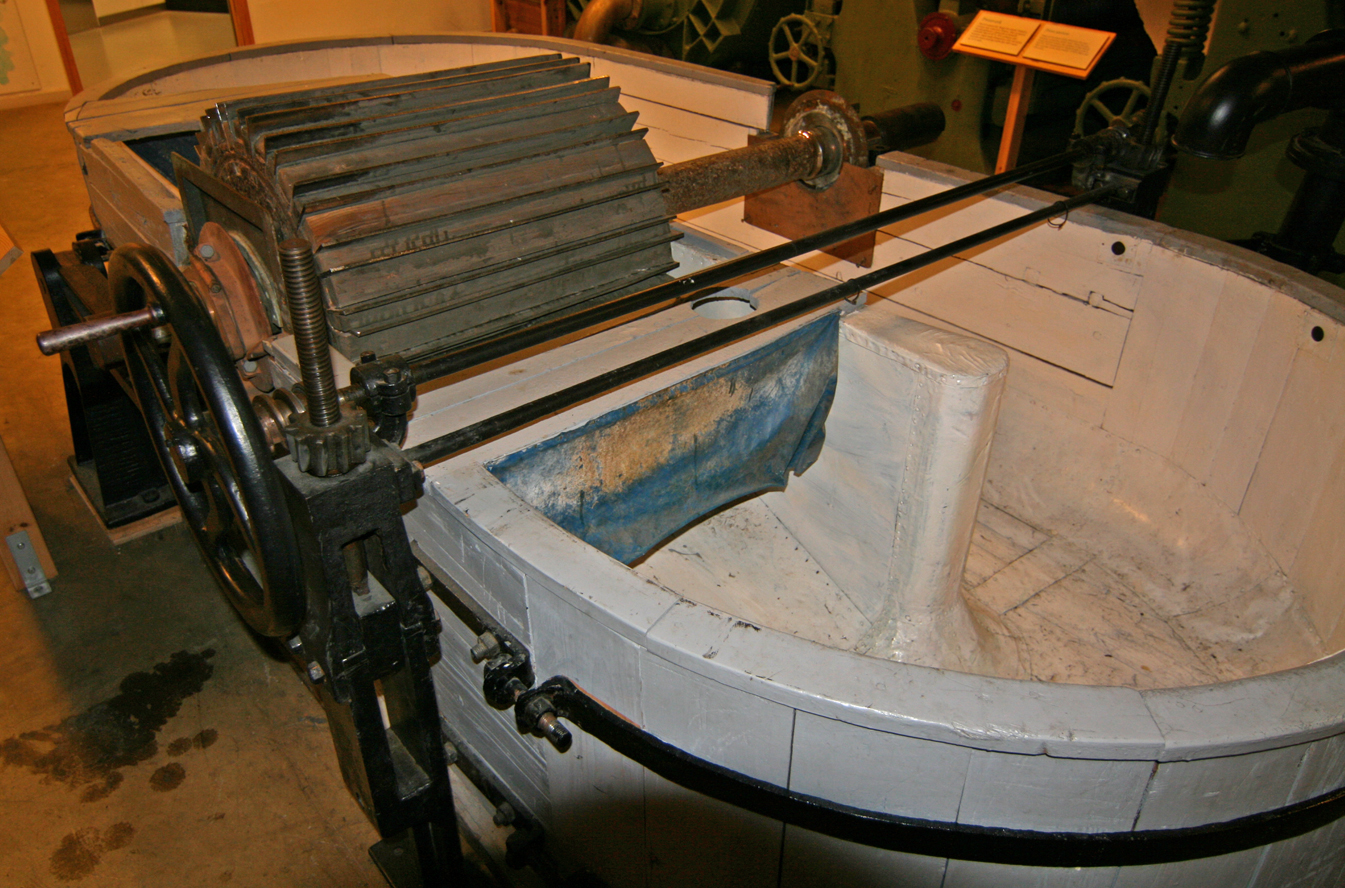
A Hollander beater

A Hollander beater is a machine developed by the Dutch in 1680 to produce paper pulp from cellulose containing plant fibers. It replaced stamp mills for preparing pulp because the Hollander could produce in one day the same quantity of pulp it would take a stamp mill eight days to prepare.

However, the wooden paddles and beating process of a stamp mill produced longer, more easily hydrated, and more fibrillated cellulose fibers; thus increasing the resulting paper's strength. The Hollander used metal blades and a macerating action to separate the raw material, resulting in shorter cellulose fibers and weaker paper. Further, the metal blades of the Hollander often introduced metal contaminants into the paper as one metal blade struck another. These contaminants often acted as catalysts for oxidation that has been implicated in browning of old paper called foxing.

Hollander beater patent

In turn, the Hollander was (partially) replaced by the conical refiner or Jordan refiner, named after its American inventor Joseph Jordan, who patented the device in 1858.

A Hollander beater design consists of a circular or ovoid water raceway with a beater wheel at a single point along the raceway. The beater wheel is a centrifugal compressor or radial impeller cylinder parallel to a grooved plate, similar to the construction of a water wheel or timing pulley. Under power, the blades rotate to beat the fiber into a usable pulp slurry. The beater wheel and plate do not touch, as this would result in cutting. The distance between the two is adjusted to increase or decrease the pressure on the fibers when passing through the beater.

The objective of using a beater (rather than another process like grinding, as many wood-pulp mills do) is to create longer, hydrated, fibrillated fibers. (Fibrillated fibers are abraded to the extent that many partially broken-off fibers extend from the main fiber, increasing the fiber's surface area, and hence its potential for hydrogen bonding). Grinding of fibers is not desirable. Therefore, the "blades" are not what might be thought of as "sharpened", and well-designed beaters make it possible to minimize the shear action of the rotating blades against the bottom of the water raceway.

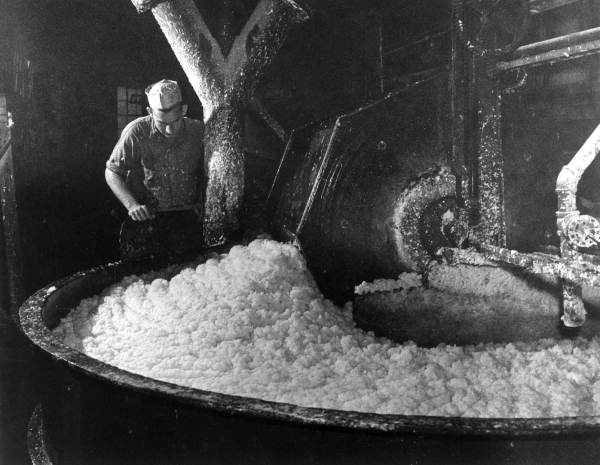
Processing pulp in a Hollander beater (1947)
