= Morton White =

American philosopher and historian of ideas

Morton White (April 29, 1917 – May 27, 2016) was an American philosopher and historian of ideas. He was a proponent of a doctrine he called "holistic pragmatism" (a variant of pragmatism) and also a noted scholar of American intellectual history. He was a professor in the Department of Philosophy at Harvard University from 1953 to 1970. He was Professor Emeritus in the School of Historical Studies at the Institute for Advanced Study in Princeton, New Jersey, where he served as Professor in the School of Historical Studies from 1970 until he retired in 1987.

== Biography ==
White was born Morton Gabriel Weisberger on the Lower East Side of Manhattan in New York City. He attended City College of New York as an undergraduate before doing his postgraduate studies at Columbia University, where he completed his Ph.D. in 1942 under Ernest Nagel, who was himself a student of John Dewey. In 1949 he published Social Thought in America, a critical history of liberal social philosophy as represented by the ideas of Dewey, Oliver Wendell Holmes Jr., Thorstein Veblen, Charles A. Beard, and James Harvey Robinson. When the book was republished in 1957 he added a preface in which he softened some of his criticisms, and he added an epilogue in which he attacked the religious liberalism of Reinhold Niebuhr and the conservatism of Walter Lippmann. "Time and recent events," he wrote, "have brought the liberal outlook under a very different kind of attack- an attack with which I have no sympathy- and I fear that my own critical observations might wrongly be associated with arguments, positions, and purposes quite foreign to my own." In his 1956 work, Toward Reunion in Philosophy, White attempted to reconcile the pragmatist and analytic traditions in American philosophy.

At Harvard, White was a colleague of Willard Van Orman Quine, and the philosophical views of the two are closely related, particularly in their rejection of a sharp distinction between a priori and empirical statements. But White rejects Quine's view that "Philosophy of science is philosophy enough." Using the framework of holistic pragmatism, White argues that philosophical inquiry can just as well be applied to cultural institutions beyond science, such as law and art.

White died at the age of 99 on May 27, 2016 in Montgomery, New Jersey.

== Selected bibliography ==
- The Origin of Dewey's Instrumentalism (Columbia University Press, 1943)
- Social Thought in America: The Revolt Against Formalism (Viking, 1949)
- (Ed.) The Mentor Philosophers: The Age of Analysis: 20th Century Philosophers (Houghton Mifflin, 1955)
- Toward Reunion in Philosophy (Harvard University Press, 1956)
- (Morton and Lucia White) The Intellectual versus the City : from Thomas Jefferson to Frank Lloyd Wright (Harvard, 1962)
- (Arthur Schlesinger Jr. and Morton White, eds.) Paths of American Thought (Houghton Mifflin, 1963)
- The Foundations of Historical Knowledge (Harper & Row, 1965)
- Science and Sentiment in America (Oxford University Press, 1972)
- The Philosophy of the American Revolution (Oxford University Press, 1978)
- What Is and What Ought to be Done : an essay on ethics and epistemology (Oxford University Press, 1981)
- (Morton and Lucia White) Journeys to the Japanese, 1952-1979 (British Columbia University Press, 1986)
- Philosophy, The Federalist, and the Constitution (Oxford University Press, 1987)
- The Question of Free Will: A Holistic View (Princeton University Press, 1993)
- A Philosopher's Story (Penn State University Press, 1999) (Autobiography)
- A Philosophy of Culture: The Scope of Holistic Pragmatism (Princeton University Press, 2002)
- From a Philosophical Point of View: Selected Studies (Princeton University Press, 2004)

== See also ==
- American philosophy
