= Stuart Hampshire =

British philosopher and literary critic (1914–2004)

Sir Stuart Hampshire FBA
- Born: Stuart Newton Hampshire; 1 October 1914; Healing, Lincolnshire, England
- Died: 13 June 2004 (aged 89); Oxford, Oxfordshire, England

Education
- Education: Balliol College, Oxford

Philosophical work
- Era: Contemporary philosophy
- Region: Western philosophy
- School: Analytic philosophy
- Institutions: University College London; New College, Oxford; Princeton University; Stanford University
- Doctoral students: Robert Stalnaker
- Main interests: Philosophy of mind, moral philosophy, history of philosophy
- Notable ideas: Persons as self-willed agents Justice as conflict

Sir Stuart Newton Hampshire FBA (1 October 1914 – 13 June 2004) was an English philosopher, literary critic and university administrator. He was one of the antirationalist Oxford thinkers who gave a new direction to moral and political thought in the post-World War II era.

== Biography ==
Hampshire was born in Healing, Lincolnshire, the son of George Newton Hampshire, a fish merchant in nearby Grimsby. Hampshire was educated at Lockers Park School in Hertfordshire (where he overlapped with Guy Burgess), Repton School and Balliol College, Oxford, where he matriculated as a history scholar. He did not confine himself to history, switching instead to the study of Greats and immersing himself in the study of painting and literature. As was the culture at Balliol, his intellectual development owed more to his gifted contemporaries than to academic tutors. Having taken a first class degree, in 1936 he was elected to a Fellowship of All Souls College, Oxford, where he researched and taught philosophy initially as an adherent of logical positivism. He participated in an informal discussion group with some of the leading philosophers of his day, including J. L. Austin, H. L. A. Hart, and Isaiah Berlin.

In 1940, at the outbreak of World War II he enlisted in the army and was given a commission. Due to his lack of physical aptitude he was seconded to a position in military intelligence near London where he worked with Oxford colleagues such as Gilbert Ryle and Hugh Trevor-Roper. His encounters as interrogator with Nazi officers at the end of the war led to his insistence on the reality of evil.

After the war, he worked for the government before resuming his career in philosophy. From 1947 to 1950, he taught at University College London, and was subsequently a fellow of New College, Oxford. His study Spinoza was first published in 1951. In 1955, he returned to All Souls, as a resident fellow and domestic bursar.

In 1962 Hampshire was asked by the UK Treasury to conduct a review of GCHQ, covering technical, political, economic and strategic factors over the next ten years, including the relationship with the US National Security Agency through the UKUSA relationship. The 'Hampshire Report' set direction and funding for GCHQ for the future and put its relationship with the NSA at the centre of its growth.

His innovative book Thought and Action (1959) attracted much attention, notably from his Oxford colleague Iris Murdoch. It propounded an intentionalist theory of the philosophy of mind taking account of developments in psychology. Although he considered most continental philosophy vulgar and fraudulent, Hampshire was much influenced by Maurice Merleau-Ponty. He insisted that philosophy of mind "has been distorted by philosophers when they think of persons only as passive observers and not as self-willed agents". In his subsequent books, Hampshire sought to shift moral philosophy from its focus on the logical properties of moral statements to what he considered the crucial question of moral problems as they present themselves to us as practical agents.

In 1960, Stuart Hampshire was elected a member of the British Academy and became Grote Professor of the Philosophy of Mind and Logic at University College London, succeeding A. J. Ayer. His international reputation was growing and from 1963 to 1970 he chaired the department of philosophy at Princeton University to which he had happily escaped from the robust atmosphere of London to which his mandarin style, conveyed in a rather preposterous growling accent, was ill-suited, as Ayer implied in his memoirs. In 1970, he returned to Oxford as Warden of Wadham College, Oxford. Wadham was in the first group of men-only Oxford colleges to admit women in 1974. Hampshire considered his wardenship to be one of his most significant achievements in reviving the fortunes of the college. He was knighted in 1979 and retired from Wadham in 1984, when he accepted a professorship at Stanford University.

His last book, Justice Is Conflict (1999), inaugurated the Princeton Monographs in Philosophy series.

Stuart Hampshire wrote extensively on literature and other topics for The Times Literary Supplement and The New York Review of Books amongst others. He was head of the literary panel of the Arts Council for many years. In 1962–63, he was selected by the UK government to conduct a review of the effectiveness of GCHQ.

He married his first wife, Renée Ayer (née Lees), the former wife of the philosopher A. J. Ayer, in 1961. They had a daughter by this marriage which ended with Renée's death in 1980. In 1985 he married Nancy Cartwright, who was then his colleague at Stanford and is now Professor of Philosophy at Durham University and at the University of California, San Diego. The couple had two daughters.

== Publications ==
- Hampshire, Stuart (1951). Spinoza. Harmondsworth, Middlesex: Pelican Books. OCLC 4248345.
- Hampshire, Stuart (1956). Age of reason: the 17th century philosophers. New York: New American Library. OCLC 552805. (The Mentor Philosophers.)
- Hampshire, Stuart (1960). Spinoza and the idea of freedom (PDF). London: Oxford University Press. OCLC 71768261.
- Hampshire, Stuart (1962). Feeling and expression. London: H. K. Lewis & Co. Ltd. OCLC 36870104. (An inaugural lecture delivered at University College, London, 25 October 1960.)
- Hampshire, Stuart (1975) [1965]. Freedom of the individual. Princeton, New Jersey: Princeton University Press. ISBN 9780691019840.
- Hampshire, Stuart (1969). Modern writers, and other essays. Chatto & Windus. ISBN 978-0-7011-1320-9.
- Hampshire, Stuart (1970) [1959]. Thought and action. London: Chatto and Windus. ISBN 9780701107390.
- Hampshire, Stuart (1972). Freedom of mind, and other essays. Oxford: Clarendon Press. ISBN 9780198243830.
- Hampshire, Stuart (1976). Knowledge and the future. Southampton, England: University of Southampton. ISBN 9780854321667. (Gwilym James Memorial Lecture.)
- Hampshire, Stuart (1977). Two theories of morality. Oxford: Published for the British Academy by Oxford University Press. ISBN 9780197259757. (Thank-offering to Britain Fund Lecture.)
- Hampshire, Stuart; Scanlon, T.M.; Williams, Bernard; Nagel, Thomas; Dworkin, Ronald (1978). Public and private morality. Cambridge New York: Cambridge University Press. ISBN 9780521293525.
- Hampshire, Stuart (1982), "Morality and convention", in Sen, Amartya; Williams, Bernard (eds.), Utilitarianism and beyond, Cambridge: Cambridge University Press, pp. 145–158, ISBN 9780511611964.
- Hampshire, Stuart (1983). Morality and conflict. Cambridge, Massachusetts: Harvard University Press. ISBN 9780674587328.
- Hampshire, Stuart (1988). Spinoza: an introduction to his philosophical thought. Penguin Philosophy Series. Penguin. ISBN 9780140136562.
- Hampshire, Stuart (1991). Innocence and experience. Cambridge, Massachusetts: Harvard University Press. ISBN 9780674454491.
- Hampshire, Stuart (2000). Justice is conflict. Princeton, New Jersey: Princeton University Press. ISBN 9780691089744.
- Hampshire, Stuart (2005). Spinoza and Spinozism. Oxford New York: Clarendon Press Oxford University Press. ISBN 9780199279548.

== Sources ==
- Ryan, Alan (2007). "Stuart Newton Hampshire 1914-2004" (PDF). Proceedings of the British Academy. 150: 107–123.

Academic offices
Preceded by Maurice Bowra	Warden of Wadham College, Oxford; 1970–1984	Succeeded by Claus Moser, Baron Moser
