= The Mentor Philosophers =

Book Series

The Mentor Philosophers was a series of six books each covering a period of philosophical thought, published by the New American Library. Each book was edited by an esteemed contemporary philosophy academic and contained analysis of a group of philosophers from a chosen period.

The series was very influential during the 1950s and 1960s, and was considered innovative, in its time, for "expanding...the realm of serious reading" available in a paperback-book format. Literary historian Gilbert Highet called it a "very important and interesting series".

Title	Year published	Editor	Subjects	Time period
The Age of Belief	1954	Anne Fremantle	St. Augustine, St. Thomas Aquinas, Boethius, Erigena, Anselm, Abelard, Bonaventure, Averroes	Medieval Philosophers
The Age of Adventure	1956	Giorgio de Santillana	Nicholas of Cusa, Da Vinci, Thomas More, Machiavelli, Michelangelo, Erasmus, Martin Luther, Albrecht Dürer, Copernicus, Montaigne, Kepler, Jakob Böhme, Galileo, Richard Hakluyt, Giordano Bruno	Renaissance Philosophers
The Age of Reason	1956	Stuart Hampshire	Francis Bacon, Pascal, Hobbes, Galileo, Descartes, Spinoza, Leibniz	17th century philosophers
The Age of Enlightenment	1956	Isaiah Berlin	John Locke, Voltaire, George Berkeley, David Hume, Thomas Reid, Condillac, La Mettrie, Johann Georg Hamann, Georg Christoph Lichtenberg	18th century philosophers
The Age of Ideology	1956	Henry David Aiken	Kant, Fichte, Hegel, Schopenhauer, Auguste Comte, Stuart Mill, Herbert Spencer, Karl Marx and Friedrich Engels, Ernst Mach, Nietzsche, Kierkegaard	19th century philosophers
The Age of Analysis	1955	Morton White	Peirce, Whitehead, James, Edmund Husserl, John Dewey, Bertrand Russell, G. E. Moore, Wittgenstein, Croce, Bergson, Rudolf Carnap, Sartre, Santayana	20th century philosophers
