= Nancy Baker Tompkins =

American writer

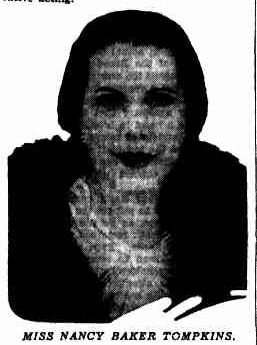
Nancy Baker Tompkins

Nancy Baker Tompkins was an American working in advertising. Tompkins was a sales representative for large paper manufacturing companies to the distributors of paper products.

== Early life ==
Nancy Baker was born in Dixon, Kentucky, the daughter of James Miles Baker and Joanna Catherine Brooks (1851–1934). She had four siblings: Mrs. Hubbard; Bessie Cosby, Vera Robinson, and Henry Baker.

She attended the University of Kentucky.

== Career ==
Tompkins was a director of the Advisory Department of the Zellerbach Paper Company, Los Angeles. She specialized in publicity and promotion. She was part owner and publisher of the Story Tellers Magazine in New York City.

She later represented large paper manufacturing companies, like Hammermill Paper Company, Honolulu Paper Company and Appleton Coated Paper Company to promote sales to the distributors of paper products. It was (said to be) the only business of its kind in the world and was started in 1931 by Tompkins and prospered in spite of the business depression. In 1934 she went to Sydney, Australia, to research a story on hotels and resorts in Australia and New Zealand, for publication in the Pacific Coast Record. During the trip she made a survey of the paper industry for the Hammermill Paper Company and the Appleton Coated Paper Company, in America. While in Sydney she stayed at the Australia Hotel.

She was a fellow of the Pacific Geographic Society.

In 1928 she was elected president of the Los Angeles Advertising Association, and she became a member of the Board of Presidents of the Advertising Clubs Association. In 1928 she was appointed by George H. Barnes as chairman of the Board of Governors of the American Green Cross to serve on the advertising committee.

In 1937 she made a six months' tour of the world, during which she visited paper mills in twenty countries.

In 1957 she published Who said it was poetry? I, myself, call the lines which follow: Reactions in rhythm.

In late 1950s she visited Arabia and Yemen, and coming back home she gave a series of illustrated lectures on her travels to fellow members of the Creative Arts, Inc, and Schubert Club.

== Personal life ==
She lived in New York City and moved to California in 1926. She lived at 2921 Francis Ave., Los Angeles, California.
