= Thought and Action =

1959 book by Stuart Hampshire

- Cover of the first edition
- Author: Stuart Hampshire
- Language: English
- Subject: Action theory
- Publisher: Chatto and Windus
- Publication date: 1959
- Publication place: United Kingdom
- Media type: Print (Hardcover and Paperback)
- Pages: 276
- ISBN: 978-0268018474

Thought and Action is a 1959 book about action theory by the philosopher Stuart Hampshire. The book has received praise from commentators, and is considered Hampshire's major work.

== Summary ==
He argues that empiricist theories of perception descending from the philosophers George Berkeley and David Hume mistakenly represent people as passive observers receiving impressions from "outside" of the mind, where the "outside" includes their own bodies.

== Publication history ==
Thought and Action was first published by Chatto and Windus in 1959.

== Reception ==
The historian Peter Gay wrote that Thought and Action is a "brilliant" and "lucid" contribution to the philosophy of action, and a subtle vindication of free will. The philosopher Roger Scruton credited Hampshire with providing a seminal discussion of two contrasting outlooks on the future that can be called "predicting and deciding". The philosopher R. S. Downie described Thought and Action as Hampshire's major work, while the philosopher Anthony Quinton wrote that Hampshire's "systematic aim and fine mandarin prose were both unusual for an Oxford philosopher of the time."
