= When They Severed Earth from Sky =

2004 book by lizabeth Wayland Barber and Paul T. Barber

- Cover
- Author: Elizabeth Wayland Barber; Paul T. Barber
- Language: English
- Genre: Mythology, Cognitive science, Anthropology
- Publisher: Princeton University Press
- Publication date: 2004
- Publication place: United States
- Media type: Print (Hardcover and Paperback)
- Pages: 290
- ISBN: 0-691-09986-3
- Dewey Decimal: 201.3
- LC Class: BL312.B37 2005

When They Severed Earth from Sky: How the Human Mind Shapes Myth is a 2004 work by Elizabeth Wayland Barber and Paul T. Barber that examines how preliterate societies encoded information about natural events and observations into mythological narratives. Published by Princeton University Press, the book presents a theoretical framework of cognitive principles governing how myths develop, transmit, and degrade over time. The authors argue that many myths preserve accurate information about geological and astronomical phenomena, functioning as "time capsules" that transmit crucial survival knowledge across millennia before the invention of writing. The work analyzes mythological narratives from various cultures, particularly examining cases where independent geological or archaeological evidence can verify the historical events potentially encoded in myths.

== Development and context ==
The book emerged from the authors' research on mythological narratives across multiple cultures over approximately twenty-four years. Elizabeth Wayland Barber, a linguist and archaeologist at Occidental College specializing in prehistoric textiles and Indo-European languages, collaborated with her partner Paul T. Barber, a folklorist at UCLA's Fowler Museum who had previously investigated burial practices and vampire beliefs in "Vampires, Burial, and Death" (Yale, 1988).

The project built on Dorothy Vitaliano's geological interpretation of myths in "Legends of the Earth" (1973), which established the field later termed geomythology. Bruce Masse expanded this approach in the 1990s by incorporating astronomical phenomena alongside geological events. The Barbers departed from their predecessors by emphasizing cognitive mechanisms rather than cataloging mythological-geological correspondences. Their framework addressed how preliterate societies encoded observations into transmissible narratives, not merely whether myths contained factual content.

The authors analyzed myths from the Pacific Northwest, ancient Greece, Egypt, Mesopotamia, and Northern Europe, selecting cases where independent evidence could verify proposed correlates. The Klamath account of Crater Lake served as their primary test case, as the narrative's volcanic imagery could be compared against the geological record of Mount Mazama's collapse 7,675 years ago. Similarly, their interpretation of Hesiod's Theogony drew on evidence from the Thera eruption (circa 1625 BCE) preserved in ice cores and archaeological sites.

=== Scholarly context ===
Princeton University Press published the work in 2004 (hardcover) and 2006 (paperback). The December 2004 Indian Ocean tsunami coincidentally demonstrated the survival value of mythologically encoded knowledge when Moken sea nomads and some Phuket islanders evacuated based on traditional narratives about receding waters, while tourists lacking such knowledge remained in danger zones.

The book prompted divided scholarly responses. Archaeoastronomers and geologists, including E.C. Krupp of Griffith Observatory, endorsed its methodology. Patrick Nunn cited it as validating his research on Australian Aboriginal narratives encoding sea-level changes over 10,000 years. The authors contributed to L. Piccardi and W.B. Masse's "Myth and Geology" (Geological Society London, 2007) and published refinements in the Journal of Cognitive Historiography (2022).

== Summary ==
The book presents a cognitive approach to understanding how myths encode and transmit information about actual events across generations in preliterate societies. The work develops from the premise that before the invention of writing approximately 5,000 years ago, oral traditions served as the primary vehicle for preserving knowledge crucial for survival. The authors identify what they term the "Memory Crunch" - the cognitive challenge of compressing complex information into formats that can survive transmission through oral channels over thousands of years.

The book's theoretical framework centers on four fundamental "mytho-linguistic" principles that govern how myths evolve and degrade over time. The Silence Principle, which several reviewers identified as the work's most significant contribution, posits that information assumed to be universally known is not explicitly stated, leading to gradual loss of context across generations. The Analogy Principle suggests that preliterate peoples used comparisons and relationships to explain phenomena when cause-and-effect relationships were not understood. The Compression Principle describes how multiple events and long time periods become conflated into single narratives, while the Restructuring Principle explains how cultural changes lead to reinterpretation of mythic elements until their original meanings become unintelligible.

The authors present their argument through eighteen chapters that progressively build their theoretical framework, developing fifty-one specific principles for myth interpretation. Following the introductory "Time Capsules," the work examines memory limitations in oral cultures, then systematically explores how cognitive processes shape mythic narratives. The chapters address topics including willfulness (the attribution of intent to natural phenomena), multiple perspectives on single events, metaphoric reality, compression of time and events, mnemonic devices, and the conceptualization of spirit worlds. The final chapters apply these principles to specific mythological complexes, analyzing the Prometheus myth as a possible volcanic narrative and examining European dragon myths as potential misinterpretations of natural phenomena such as tomb fires.

The authors build their case by matching ancient myths against geological and astronomical evidence. Their primary example traces how the Klamath Tribes' story of Crater Lake preserves specific details of Mount Mazama's volcanic eruption and collapse nearly 7,700 years ago. They apply this same approach to Pacific Northwest flood narratives (checking them against geological records), Greek myths that might encode memories of Thera's eruption around 1625 BCE, and astronomical stories that could document ancient observations of precessional shifts. The authors concede that empirical proof remains scarce for many connections, falling back on what they call "well-attested principles" to support their interpretations.

The work's approach differs from contemporary mythological scholarship that emphasizes performance contexts, social functions, and cultural meanings of myths within specific societies. The authors define myths as "similes that have lost their like," focusing on recovering original natural events rather than examining how myths operate as living traditions. This emphasis on origins over cultural function, combined with limited engagement with recent developments in mythology studies, positions the work separately from mainstream mythological scholarship.

== Critical reception ==
In his review, Michael Shermer praised the book as a thoroughly researched analysis demonstrating how historical facts can be extracted from mythic narratives. Shermer found the authors' methodology of "stripping" myths to their core elements particularly effective in cases like the Beowulf dragon narrative, which they interpret as a tomb fire rather than a mythical creature. The review emphasized how the four overarching principles provide a systematic framework for understanding myth formation. Shermer appreciated the book's straightforward thesis while noting that the numerous specific principles could make generalization challenging.

William G. Doty questioned what he sees as the book's fundamental premise that myths primarily encode singular historical events, arguing that the authors overlook the originary status of myths as they are recreated in each telling. Doty criticized the work for ignoring contemporary myth studies and reaching what he considered banal conclusions about volcanic or astronomical origins of myths. Doty suggested that the authors' focus on primal origins represents a fallacy, as the enduring power of myths derives not from incorporating early events but from their continued cultural relevance across generations.

Daniel Peretti acknowledged the book's intriguing premise and enjoyable readability but raised concerns about the lack of empirical proof for many conclusions. While the authors' analysis of cognitive operations seemed sound, Peretti found the connections between their principles and actual myths sometimes tenuous. Peretti criticized the work for excluding much existing myth scholarship, paying little attention to performance contexts or sacred qualities of stories, and oversimplifying complex mythological traditions. He questioned whether myths presumably composed long after supposed triggering events could actually preserve memories of those events.

Abigail A. Baird described the work as integrating data from geology to smell perception, creating valuable interdisciplinary insights. Baird highlighted the book's discussion of how myths deftly handle human cognition in the absence of written records. She found the systematic framework of fifty-one specific principles particularly useful for understanding myth formation, though she noted that the human psyche's importance in shaping myths might be underemphasized. "The authors' framework, Beowulf's fight with a dragon makes perfect sense," she observed, praising the work's ability to make bizarre mythological elements comprehensible through systematic analysis.

Wilhelm Dupré found the Silence Principle to be the book's most important and valuable finding, appreciating how it explains the loss of contextual information over time. However, Dupré expressed concern that the authors failed to apply this principle fully to their own approach, remaining largely quiet about the mythic perception of reality as both a historical problem and an issue of lasting significance. Dupré questioned whether the cognitive patterns the authors identify are sufficient to account for all myth formation. While acknowledging the authors' demonstration that myths can encode observations and events, he suggested they had not adequately explained what renders these particular narratives mythic rather than simply historical.

Diana Burton positioned the book within a broader scholarly context, noting how the Barbers regard myths as coding systems for knowledge about natural history. Burton observed that their formulation of principles grouped under Silence, Analogy, Compression, and Restructuring aimed to trace original events behind myths. Burton highlighted the authors' acknowledgment of limited empirical proof for some conclusions while noting their provision of scholarly support for other interpretations. The reviewer suggested that the approach, presented in the book, differs significantly from contemporary mythological scholarship that focuses on how myths operate within their cultural contexts.

== See also ==
- Hamlet's Mill
