= Elizabeth Wayland Barber =

American textile archaeologist and writer

Elizabeth Wayland
- Born: 1940 (age 85–86); Pasadena, California, United States
- Education: Bryn Mawr College (BA); Yale University (PhD)

Elizabeth Jane Wayland Barber (née Wayland; born 1940) is an American scholar and expert on archaeology, linguistics, textiles, and folk dance as well as professor emeritus of archaeology and linguistics at Occidental College.

== Early life ==
Elizabeth Jane Wayland was born in 1940 in Pasadena, California. She became interested in archaeology at a young age because of her love of interdisciplinary sciences. Her family moved to France during her childhood, where she learned French, beginning her interest in linguistics. She first learned sewing and weaving skills from her mother.

== Scholarly work ==
She earned a bachelor's degree from Bryn Mawr College in archaeology and Greek studies in 1963. Her chief mentor was Mabel Lang, from whom she learned Linear B and who advised her honors thesis on Linear A. In addition to Lang, Wayland wrote her thesis under Emmett L. Bennett Jr. Her thesis used computer indices of the Hagia Triada Linear A texts in an attempt to decipher its signs and symbols. The computer indices were made via punched cards, a method which was preceded by the work of Alice Kober on Linear B. She earned her PhD from Yale University in linguistics in 1968. Her doctoral studies at Yale University were supervised by Sydney Lamb, under whom she wrote her dissertation, The Computer Aided Analysis of Undeciphered Ancient Texts.

== Books ==
Her books include Prehistoric Textiles: The Development of Cloth in the Neolithic and Bronze Ages with Special Reference to the Aegean (1992), Women's Work: The First 20,000 Years; Women, Cloth, and Society in Early Times (1995), The Mummies of Ürümchi (1999), When They Severed Earth from Sky: How the Human Mind Shapes Myth (2004; coauthored with Paul T. Barber), The Dancing Goddesses: Folklore, Archaeology, and the Origins of European Dance (2013), Resplendent Dress from Southeastern Europe: A History in Layers (2013), and Two Thoughts with but a Single Mind: Crime and Punishment and the Writing of Fiction (2013; co-authored with Paul T. Barber and Mary Zirin).

Among other things, she has proposed that if 19th-century scientists had thought to name prehistorical periods with consideration of women's work and the things women invented instead of focusing their naming only on men's inventions (Iron Age, Bronze Age, etc.), that they might have acknowledged women's invention of string as what she has named “The String Revolution.”

== Personal life ==
In addition to her academic work, she directs and choreographs for her own folk and historical dance troupe.

In 2016 and 2017, Barber's dance troupe performed at University of California Los Angeles, Occidental College, and 2017 Sunshine Statewide Folk Dance Festival.

She is married to Paul T. Barber.
