= Giorgio de Santillana =

Italian-American philosopher and historian of science (1902–1974)

- Born: May 30, 1902; Rome, Italy
- Died: June 8, 1974 (aged 72); Dade County, Florida
- Occupations: Philosopher and historian of science
- Known for: The Crime of Galileo (1955); Hamlet's Mill (1969)

Academic background
- Education: Sapienza University of Rome (1925)

Academic work
- Discipline: Philosophy of science; History of science
- Sub-discipline: Ancient science; Renaissance science
- Institutions: Massachusetts Institute of Technology (1941–1974)

Giorgio Diaz de Santillana (30 May 1902 – 8 June 1974) was an Italian-American philosopher and historian of science, particularly of ancient science and of the Renaissance science of Galileo Galilei. He was a professor of the History of Science at the Massachusetts Institute of Technology best known for his books The Crime of Galileo (1955) and Hamlet's Mill (1969).

== Early life and education ==
Giorgio de Santillana was born in Rome, Italy on 30 May 1902 into a Sephardic Jewish family, which traced its roots through Tunisia and Livorno back to the Iberian peninsula. His father was the Tunisian-Italian jurist and expert on Islamic Law David Santillana.

In 1925, he graduated from the Università di Roma alla Sapienza with a degree in physics. He then spent two years in philosophy in Paris, followed by another two years in physics at the Università degli studi di Milano.

== Career ==
After his time in Milan, he was called back to Rome by Federigo Enriques to put together a course on the history of science. In Rome, he taught history of science and philosophy of science. Santillana next moved to the United States in 1936, where he became an instructor in the philosophy of science at The New School for Social Research 1937–1938 and then a visiting lecturer at Harvard University.

In 1941, Santillana began teaching at the Massachusetts Institute of Technology, becoming an assistant professor the following year. From 1943 to 1945 he served in the United States Army as a war correspondent, and he became a naturalized U.S. citizen in 1945. After the war, in 1945 he returned to MIT and in 1948 he was made an associate professor. In 1954, he became a full Professor of the History of Science in the School of Humanities. In 1957, he was awarded a Guggenheim Fellowship.

== Work ==
Together with Edgar Zilsel, Santillana contributed a 1941 entry to the Vienna Circle history and philosophy of science project International Encyclopedia of Unified Science (1938–1969) titled "Development of Rationalism and Empiricism" consisting of two separate essays: Santillana's own essay was "Aspects of Scientific Rationalism in the Nineteenth Century," while Zilsel's was "Problems of Empiricism."

In 1953, Santillana published an annotated edition of a prior translation of Galileo Galilei's Dialogue on the Great World Systems, which appeared within five months of another major edition of Galileo's work, Stillman Drake's new translation from the Italian, Dialogue Concerning the Two Chief World Systems (1953). The two were sometimes reviewed together, with one such reviewer, Stanford University historian of Renaissance science Francis R. Johnson, concluding "one might suggest that the modem scientist who prefers his Galileo in twentieth-century dress would incline to Mr. Drake's volume. On the other hand, the more historically minded reader who prefers to view Galileo in the literary and intellectual costume of his own century would vote for Professor de Santillana's edition." Reviewers of both were generally agreed that the translation Santillana relied on, a 1665 edition by Thomas Salusbury, had inadequacies, though Drake later wrote an article in defense of the Salusbury translation and in criticism of Salusbury's contemporary printers, who introduced numerous errors not in the translation manuscript, and of his modern editor, Santillana, who could have caught these errors.

Santillana's work on Galileo next led him to write and to publish The Crime of Galileo in 1955, a study of Galileo's trial for heresy by the Catholic Church that lay the blame for Galileo's guilty verdict substantially on political intrigue rather than on properly doctrinal issues. Reviewers recognized its topicality in reference to contemporary American McCarthyism, Russian Stalinism, the recent investigation of J. Robert Oppenheimer, and Santillana's recent experiences in Fascist Italy, though some also questioned the value of Santillana's more speculative moral and political conclusions. Stillman Drake noted it was the first comprehensive study of this trial made available in English since the 1879 translation of Karl von Gebler's prior work, Galileo Galilei and the Roman Curia, by a Mrs. George Sturge, that it assembled valuable new information regarding the other persons involved in the case, and that it seemed to reference copies of documents so far unknown to other scholars. Santillana understood the last claim of Drake's to be sarcastic criticism and corrected his relevant errors in a letter to the editor.

In 1961, he published The Origins of Scientific Thought: From Anaximander to Proclus, 600 BC to 300 AD, which also appeared in paperback. Reviewers noted this as a development of his earlier work in Italian with Federigo Enriques but considered its interpretation of Parmenides particularly provocative and notable, though not necessarily plausible, and generally noted that technical details were thin and sometimes importantly incorrect.

In 1969, he published his book Hamlet's Mill: An Essay on Myth and the Frame of Time, coauthored with Hertha von Dechend (1915–2001) after he was inspired by her original research shared with him in 1959. This book covered possible connections between the mythological stories of Ancient Egypt, Babylon, Ancient Greece, Christianity, etc. and ancient observations pertaining to the stars, planets, and, most notably, the 26,000-year precession of the equinoxes, now categorized into the fields of ethnoastronomy and archaeoastronomy. Santillana's colleague Nathan Sivin described the book as "an end run around those scholarly custodians of the history of early astronomy who consider myths best ignored, and those ethnologists who consider astronomy best ignored, to arouse public enthusiasm for exploration into the astronomical content of myth." The book engaged in inflammatory mockery of its presumptive "custodial" opponents, for instance calling some "fertility addicts" and "the Fecundity-Trust" and calling Ernst Cassirer "blinded by condescension," and notable reviews were correspondingly harshly critical, though others were critical of technical missteps but nonetheless positive.

== Personal life and death ==
In 1948, Santillana married Dorothy Hancock Tilton (1904–1980), a descendant of John Hancock known for her work as an editor at the Houghton Mifflin Company beginning in 1940 and particularly for her effort to publish American chef, cooking author, and television personality Julia Child; she is depicted in the film Julie & Julia. Dorothy deSantillana received the dedication of The Best and the Brightest, a 1972 book about the origins of the Vietnam War by David Halberstam, who had had books published by Houghton Mifflin.

During his time at the Massachusetts Institute of Technology, Santillana was noted for his personal friendships with founding figures of cybernetics including Norbert Wiener, Jerome Lettvin, Warren McCulloch, and Walter Pitts, as well as the astronomer and nuclear scientist Philip Morrison. A colorful anecdote describes him as Wiener's personal Tarot reader.

Santillana died after a long illness beginning in the mid-1960s and a couple of years in Beverly Farms, Massachusetts, on 8 June 1974 in Dade County, Florida.

== Selected publications ==
=== Articles ===
- "Galileo and J. Robert Oppenheimer". The Reporter, December 26, 1957. pp. 10–18; reprinted in Reflections on Men and Ideas (1968, below).
- "The Seventeenth-Century Legacy: Our Mirror of Being". Daedalus, vol. 87, no. 1 (Winter, 1958), pp. 35–56; JSTOR 20026424
- with Stillman Drake, "Review: Arthur Koestler and His Sleepwalkers". Isis, vol. 50, no. 3 (September, 1959), pp. 255–260; JSTOR 227311

=== Books ===
- with Edgar Zilsel, "Development of Rationalism and Empiricism". In International Encyclopedia of Unified Science: Foundations of the Unity of Science; vol. 2, no. 8, University of Chicago Press, 1941.
- Dialogue on the Great World Systems: In the Salusbury Translation; Revised and Annotated with an Introduction by Giorgio de Santillana. The University of Chicago Press, 1953.
- The Crime of Galileo. University of Chicago Press, 1955. LCCN 55-7400.
- Leonardo Da Vinci. Reynal & Company, 1956.
- The Mentor Philosophers: The Age of Adventure: Renaissance Philosophers. New American Library, 1956.
- The Origins of Scientific Thought: From Anaximander to Proclus, 600 BC to 300 AD. University of Chicago Press, 1961. LCCN 61-17073
- Reflections on Men and Ideas. MIT Press, 1968. ISBN 9780262040167.
- with Hertha von Dechend, Hamlet's Mill: An Essay on Myth and the Frame of Time. Gambit Inc., 1969. LCCN 69-13267.
