= Conical refiner =

Machine for refining pulp in papermaking

The conical refiner is a machine used in the refining of pulp in the papermaking process. It may also be referred to as a Jordan refiner, after the American inventor Joseph Jordan who patented the device in 1858.

Jordan patent

The conical refiner is a chamber with metal bars mounted around the inside of the container. The material to be refined is pumped into the chamber at high-pressure rate in order to create an abrasive effect as the material is forced through the machine, abraded by the metal bars. At the opposite end of the chamber the resulting pulp is pumped out.
