= Uta Lindgren =

German historian of science

Uta Lindgren (1941–2017) was a German historian of science and historian of technology, an expert on the medieval quadrivium and geodesy, and a pioneer of the history of cartography.

== Life and work ==
Lindgren is originally from Chemnitz, where she was born on 2 March 1941. Chemnitz is in East Germany, and Lindgren became a student at the University of Freiburg, also in East Germany. She completed a doctorate there in 1969, on topics including the quadrivium and the early life of Pope Sylvester II. At some point after this, she immigrated to West Germany, and completed a habilitation in 1978 at the University of Cologne, on the medieval history of Barcelona. She then became a researcher at LMU Munich.

Her work on the history of cartography began in the early 1980s. She had her first publication on this topic in 1985, on the geography of Ptolemy, and a year later organized a conference on historic maps of the Alps. She took up a professorial chair at the University of Bayreuth in 1987, and returned in 2006. Her publications from this period include works on medieval knowledge of the figure of the Earth, on the biographies and discoveries of medieval and Renaissance cartographers, and a translation of a Spanish-language travelogue of Central Asia.

She died on 16 June 2017.

== Recognition ==
Lindgren was elected to the International Academy of the History of Science, first as a corresponding member in 1993, and as a full member in 2005.

== Books ==
Lindgren's books included:

- Gerbert von Aurillac und das Quadrivium, Untersuchungen zur Bildung im Zeitalter der Ottonen (Franz Steiner Verlag, 1976)
- Bedürftigkeit — Armut — Not, Studien zur spätmittelalterlichen Sozialgeschichte Barcelonas (Spanische Forschungen der Görresgesellschaft, Aschendorff, 1980)
- Mathemata: Festschrift fur Helmuth Gericke (edited with Menso Folkerts, Franz Steiner Verlag, 1985)
- Alpenübergänge vor 1850, Landkarten — Straßen — Verkehr (edited, Franz Steiner Verlag, 1987)
- Alexander von Humboldt, Weltbild und Wirkung auf die Wissenschaften (edited, Böhlau, 1990)
- Europäische Technik im Mittelalter, 800 bis 1400, Tradition und Innovation, ein Handbuch (edited, Gebr. Mann, 1996)
- Naturwissenschaft und Technik im Barock. Innovation, Repräsentation, Diffusion (edited, Böhlau, 1997)
