= Kyrkoköpinge Church =

Church in Skåne County, Sweden

- Kyrkoköpinge kyrka
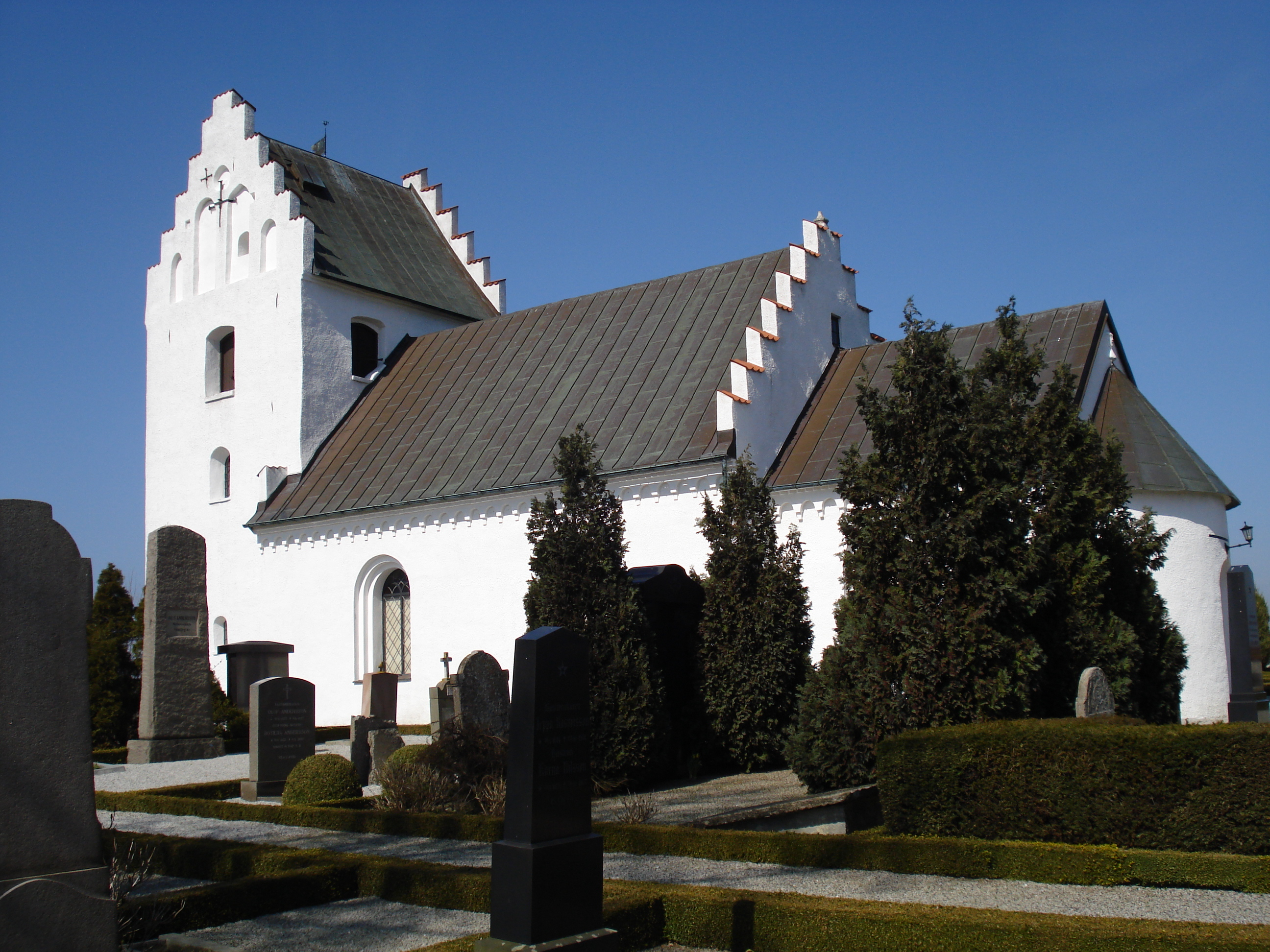
- Kyrkoköpinge Church

- 55°23′06″N 13°11′10″E
- Country: Sweden
- Denomination: Church of Sweden

Kyrkoköpinge Church (Swedish: Kyrkoköpinge kyrka) is a medieval Lutheran church just outside Trelleborg, Sweden. It belongs to the Diocese of Lund.

== History and architecture ==
The oldest parts of Kyrkoköpinge Church are the nave, choir and apse, dating from the 12th century. The builder of the church was either Mårten stenmästare, known to have worked on the construction site of Lund Cathedral, or his apprentice, known as Oxiemästaren. This can be deducted from the baptismal font of the church, which is original and bears the markings of both craftsmen.

The building material is whitewashed fieldstone, except for some of the more important details, which are of limestone. At the beginning of the 13th century, a tower was added to the church. Sometime during the Gothic era, crow-stepped gables were added to the façade. During the 15th century an original wooden ceiling was replaced by brick vaults, and during the same century a church porch was added.

== Interior ==
The church interior is partly decorated with murals, dating from the end of the 15th century. The paintings depict religious subjects: Genesis, the Last Judgment and a number of saints. Among the furnishings, the triumphal cross is an example of medieval sculpture in a transitional style between Romanesque and Gothic art. The aforementioned baptismal font is decoratively sculptured with vines and a lion. The altarpiece dates from 1631. The pulpit is possibly from the same time.
