= Giant Finn =

Giant Finn may refer to:

- Fionn mac Cumhaill, a hero in Irish mythology said to have built the Giant's Causeway
- Fin (legend), in Swedish legend Jätten Finn ('Finn the Giant')
