= Adam van Düren =

German sculptor

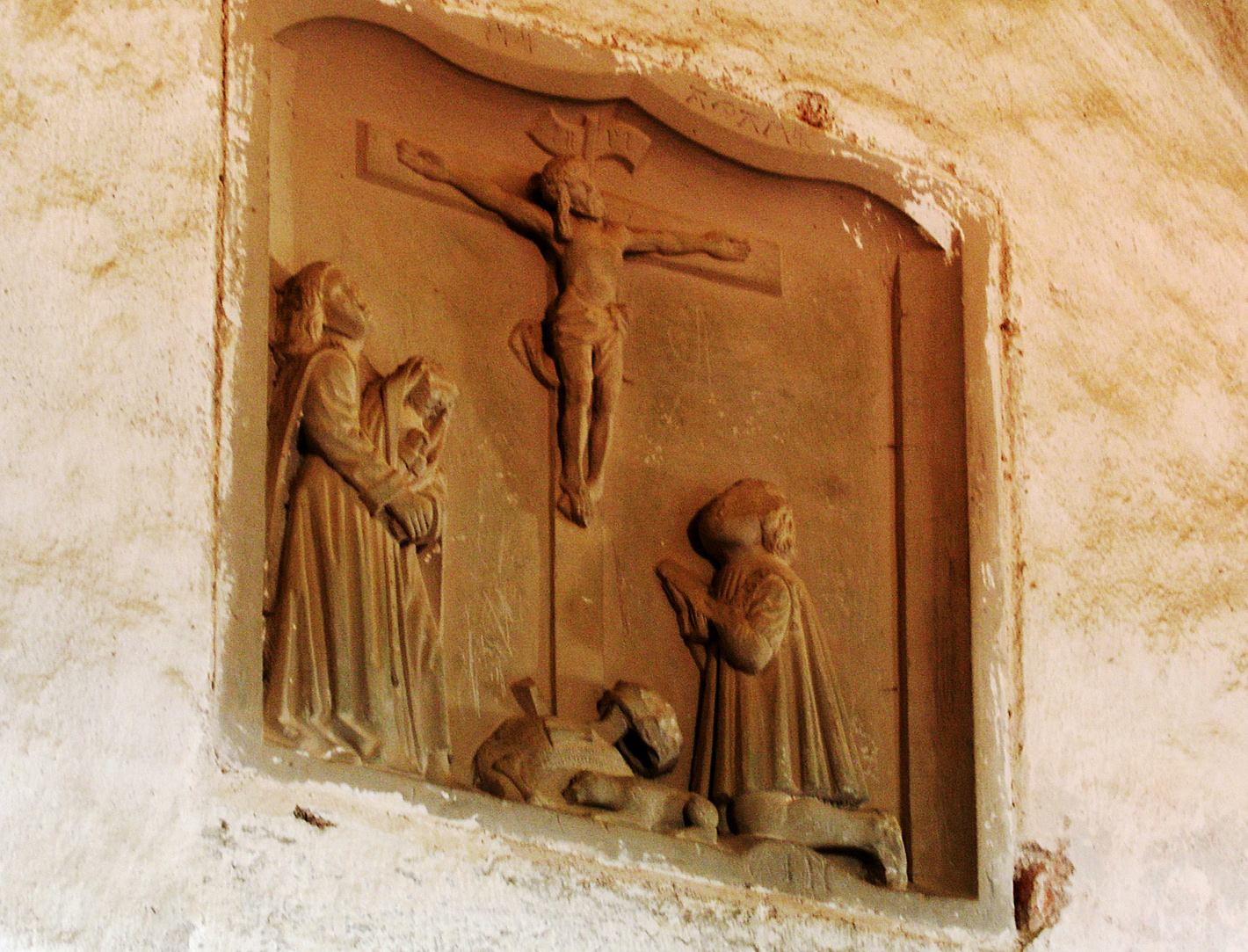
The crucifixion scene with Adam's signature at the top of the frame.

Adam van Düren was a master builder and stonemason active in Denmark and Sweden at the end of the fifteenth century and the first decades of the sixteenth century (he is attested from about 1487 until about 1532). Adam appears to have been of Westphalian origin and probably came from the city of Düren, alluded to in the byname.

He was first active at the building of the choir of Linköping Cathedral (about 1487–1498), and has been identified as one of two masons whose style is clearly recognisable in the ornaments there. He was probably the architect of the fortified house of Glimmingehus. His signature ADAM and the year 1505 is included in a relief at the third floor of Glimmingehus showing the owner of the house, Jens Holgersen Ulfstand, and his two wives in front of the crucified Christ, but his style can be recognised in several other reliefs in the building. He later restored the crypt of Lund Cathedral, where he, among other things, installed drain pipes under the floor to prevent flooding. He was briefly active in Stockholm in 1520–21, where he built a chapel in the south-eastern part of the Church of St. Nicolas (Storkyrkan), where he also added an inscribed relief on a pillar, depicting an eel and two lions.
