= Glimmingehus =

Swedish medieval castle

- Simrishamn Municipality
- Glimmingehus

Site information
- Type: Stronghold
- Owner: Swedish National Heritage Board
- Open to the public: Yes

Location
- Scania, Sweden
- Location within Skåne Location within Sweden
- Coordinates: 55.501111°N 14.231111°E

Site history
- Built: 1499; 527 years ago

Glimmingehus, situated on the Österlen plain in Scania.

Glimmingehus is a medieval era castle located at Simrishamn Municipality, Scania in southern Sweden. It is the best preserved medieval stronghold in Scandinavia. It was built 1499–1506, during an era when Scania formed a vital part of Denmark, and contains many defensive arrangements of the era, such as parapets, false doors and dead-end corridors, 'murder-holes' for pouring boiling pitch over the attackers, moats, drawbridges and various other forms of death traps to surprise trespassers and protect the nobles against peasant uprisings. The lower part of the castle's stone walls are 2.4 meters (94 inches) thick and the upper part 1.8 meters (71 inches).

== History ==
An engraving of Glimmingehus in 1680 by Gerhard von Burman.

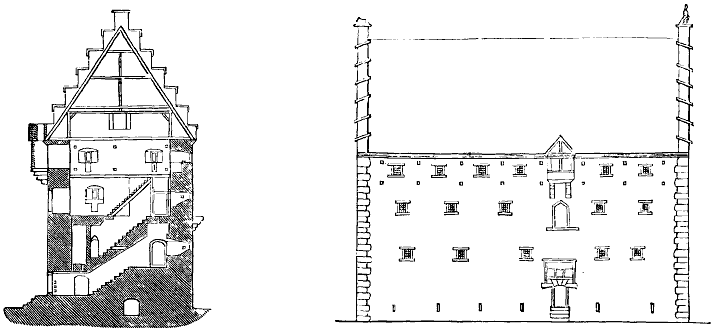
Architectural plan

Construction was started in 1499 by the Danish knight Jens Holgersen Ulfstand and stone-cutter-mason and architect Adam van Düren, a North German master who also worked on Lund Cathedral. Construction was completed in 1506.

At the time of Ulfstand, the estate as whole was referred to as Stora Glimminge. (Swedish for "Grand Glimminge"). This was a way for Ulfstand to signify its status in the surrounding area of Glimminge.

The artwork placed over the castle entrance by Jens Holgersen Ulfstand commemorate the foundation-laying year as 1499. Ulfstand was a councillor, nobleman and admiral serving under King John I of Denmark and many objects have been uncovered during archeological excavations that demonstrate the extravagant lifestyle of the knight's family at Glimmingehus up until Ulfstand's death in 1523. Some of the most expensive objects for sale in Europe during this period, such as Venetian glass, painted glass from the Rhine district and Spanish ceramics, have been found here.

Evidence of the family's wealth can also be seen inside the stone fortress, where everyday comforts for the knight's family included hot air channels in the walls and bench seats in the window recesses. Although considered comfortable for its period, it has also been argued that Glimmingehus was an expression of "Knighthood nostalgia" and not considered opulent or progressive enough even to the knight's contemporaries and especially not to later generations of the Scanian nobility. Glimmingehus is thought to have served as a residential castle for only a few generations before being transformed into a storage facility for grain.

An order from King Charles XI to the administrators of the Swedish dominion of Scania in 1676 to demolish the castle, in order to ensure that it would not fall into the hands of the Danish king during the Scanian War, could not be executed. A first attempt, in which 20 Scanian farmers were ordered to assist, proved unsuccessful. An additional force of 130 men were sent to Glimmingehus to execute the order in a second attempt. However, before they could carry out the order, a Danish-Dutch naval division arrived in Ystad, and the Swedes had to abandon the demolition attempts.

== Modern usage ==
Throughout the 18th century the castle was used as deposit for agricultural produce and in 1924 it was donated to the Swedish state. During the years 1935–38, an extensive restoration and excavation project was carried out. Today it is administered by the Swedish National Heritage Board (Riksantikvarieämbetet). On site there is a museum, medieval kitchen, shop and restaurant and coffee house. During summer time there are several guided tours daily. In local folklore, the castle is described as haunted by multiple ghosts and the tradition of story telling inspired by the castle is continued in the summer events at the castle called "Bizarre stories and terrifying tales".

== Gallery ==
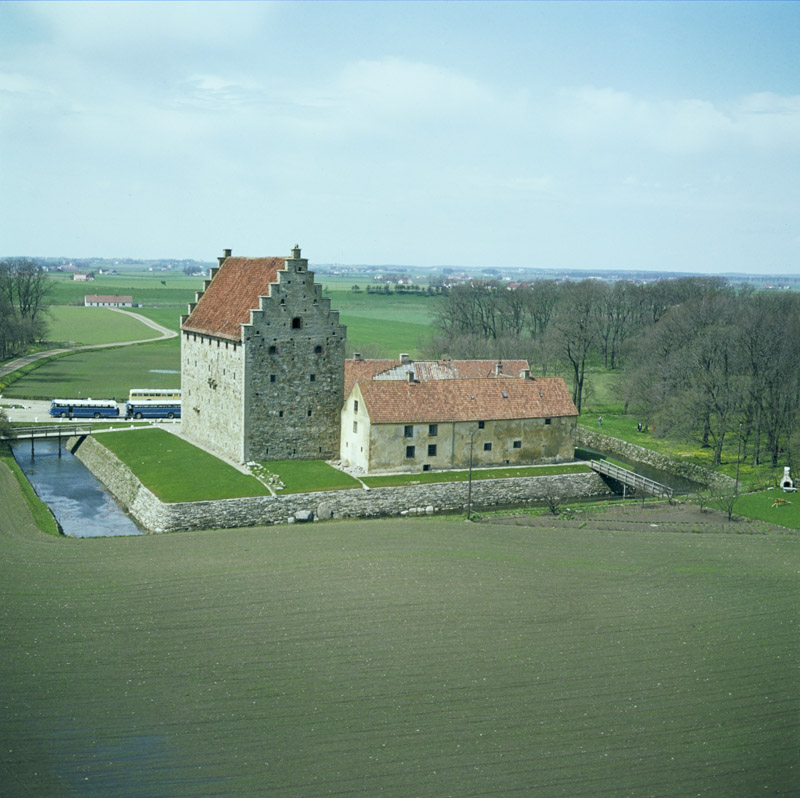
Aerial view

View of the stronghold

Front facade and main entrance of the stronghold

Relief above the main entrance

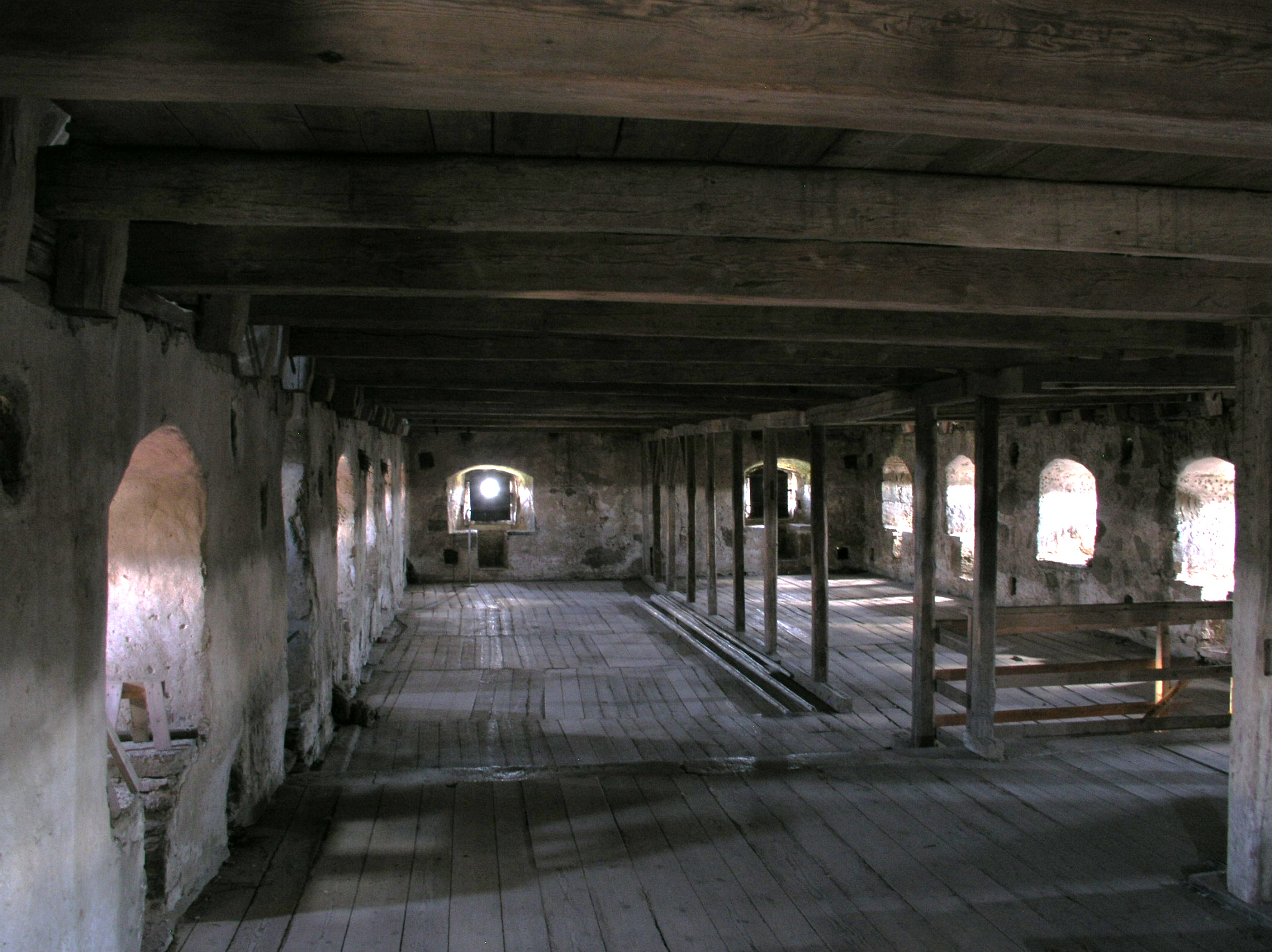
Interior

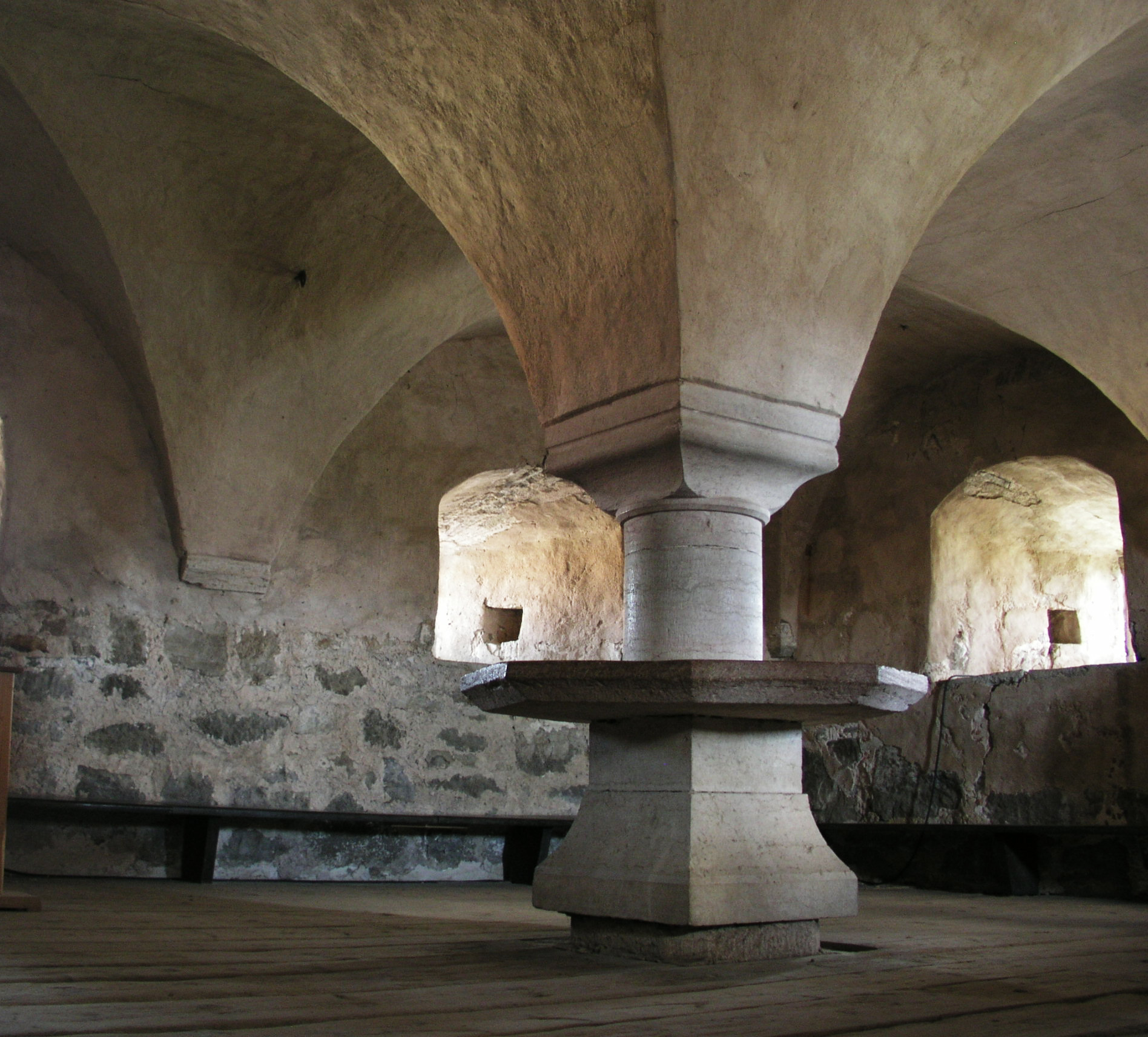
Heavy vaults in lower part

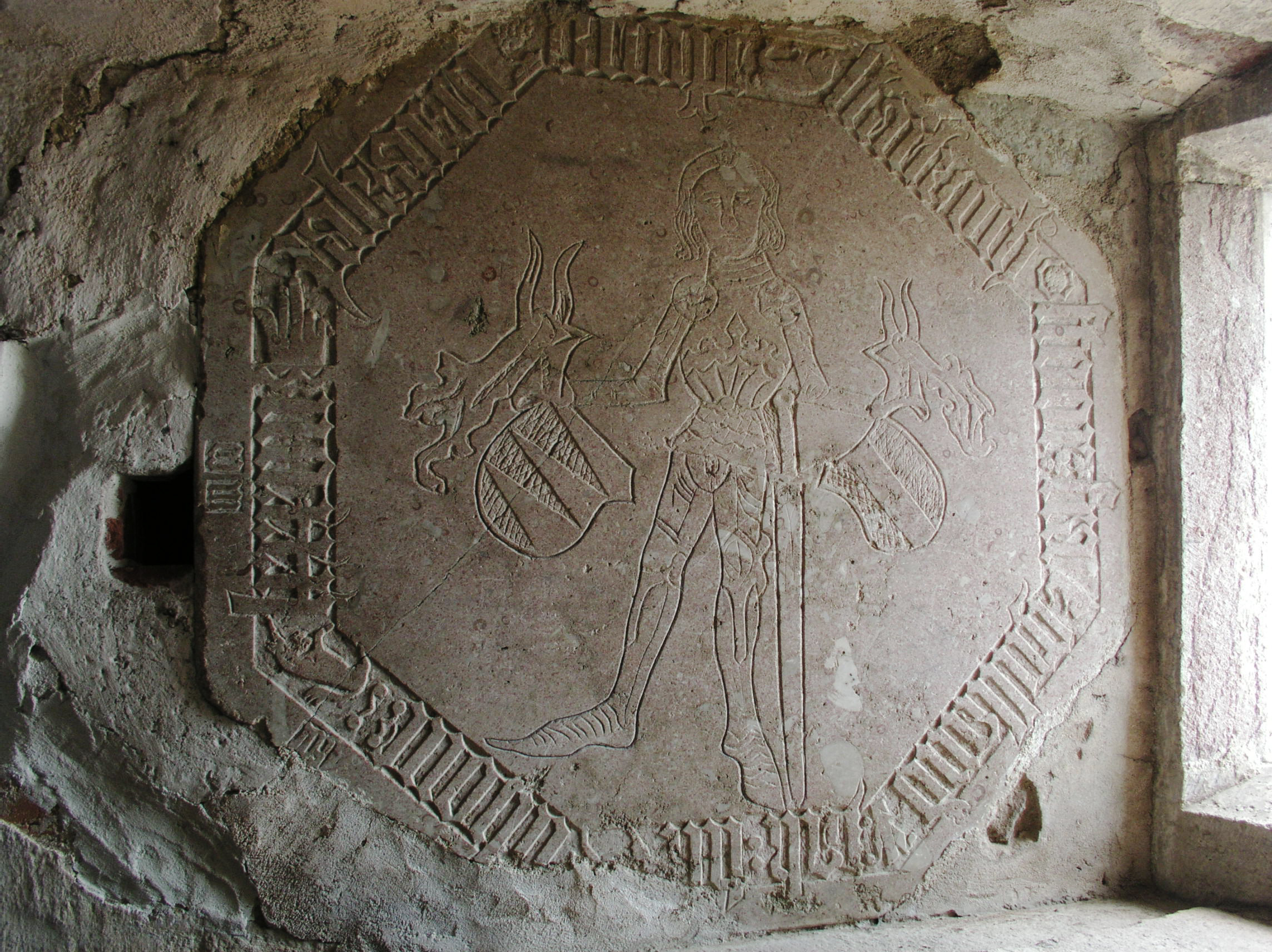
Stone artwork of Jens Holgersen Ulfstand

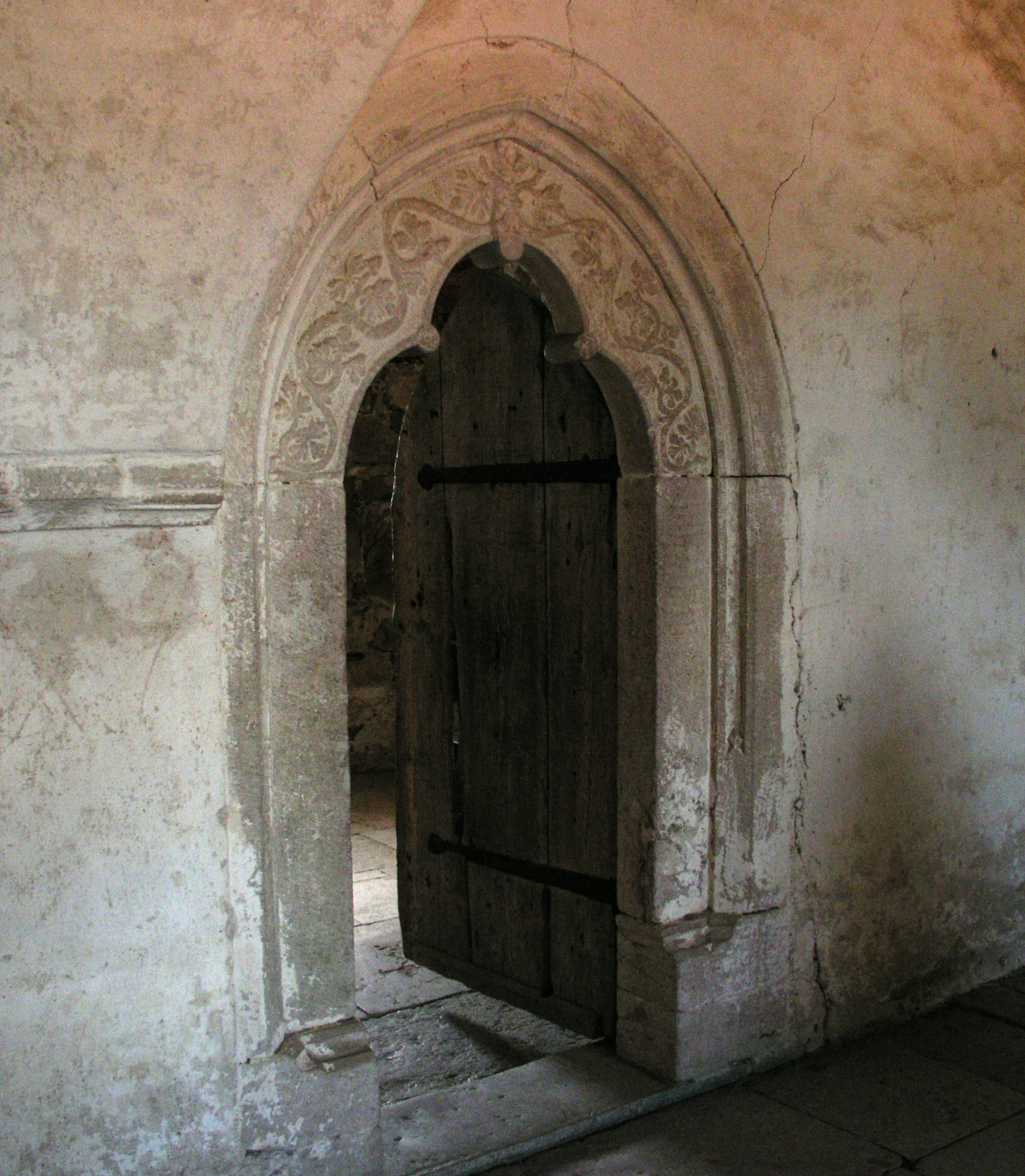
Interior door.

Stone stairs

== Other sources ==
- Ödman von Anders (1997) Glimmingehus (Stockholm, Riksantikvarieämbetet) ISBN 978-9172090644
