= Lund Cathedral =

Swedish cathedral

- Lunds domkyrka
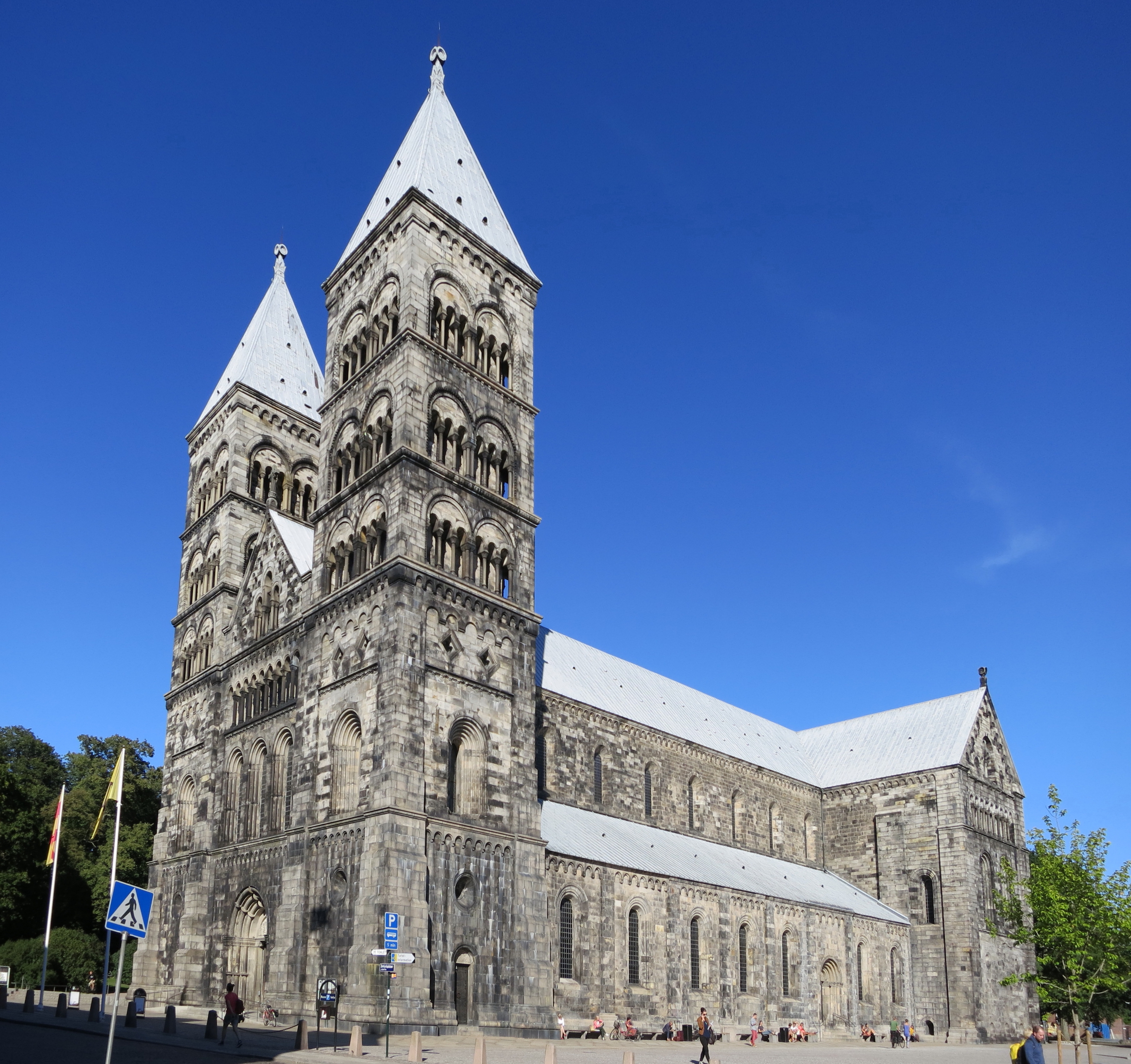
- Lund Cathedral
- 55°42′15″N 13°11′36″E
- Location: Lund
- Country: Sweden
- Denomination: Church of Sweden
- Previous denomination: Church of Denmark (until 1658); Roman Catholic (until the Reformation)
- Website: Website of the Cathedral

History
- Status: Cathedral
- Founded: Late 11th century
- Dedication: Saint Lawrence
- Consecrated: 30 June 1123 (crypt); 1 September 1145 (main altar)

Architecture
- Functional status: Active
- Heritage designation: Ecclesiastical monument in the buildings database of the Swedish National Heritage Board.
- Architect(s): Donatus; Adam van Düren; Carl Georg Brunius; Helgo Zettervall
- Style: Romanesque; Neo-Romanesque

Specifications
- Length: 85 m (279 ft)
- Width: 30 m (98 ft)
- Height: 55 m (180 ft) (to the top of the towers)

Administration
- Diocese: Lund

Clergy
- Bishop: Johan Tyrberg

Lund Cathedral (Swedish: Lunds domkyrka) is a cathedral of the Lutheran Church of Sweden in Lund, Scania, Sweden. It is the seat of the Bishop of Lund and the main church of the Diocese of Lund. It was built as the Catholic cathedral of the archiepiscopal see of all the Nordic countries, dedicated to Saint Lawrence. It is one of the oldest stone buildings still in use in Sweden.

Lund Cathedral has been called "the most powerful representative of Romanesque architecture in the Nordic countries." At the time of its construction, Lund and the cathedral belonged to Denmark. The main altar was consecrated in 1145 and the cathedral was by that time largely finished; the western towers were built somewhat later. Its architecture shows clear influences from contemporary north Italian architecture, conveyed via the Rhine Valley. The earliest architect was named Donatus, though his precise role in the construction of the cathedral is difficult to determine. The new cathedral was richly decorated with stone sculpture, including two unusual statues in the crypt traditionally called "The giant Finn and his wife" about which a local legend has developed. The cathedral was severely damaged in a fire in 1234, and major restoration works were carried out in the early 16th century under the leadership of Adam van Düren. Following the Reformation, the cathedral suffered from lost income and dilapidation. In 1658, the city of Lund and the cathedral became a part of Sweden following the Treaty of Roskilde. Lund Cathedral was the site of the ceremony acknowledging the founding of Lund University in 1668. Repairs were made during the 18th century but in 1832 a complete restoration of the cathedral was recommended. Subsequently, much of the cathedral was restored and rebuilt during most of the 19th century. The work was first led by Carl Georg Brunius and later by architect Helgo Zettervall and not entirely finished until 1893. The changes implemented during the 19th century were extensive; among other things, Zettervall had the entire western part, including the towers, demolished and rebuilt to his own designs.

The medieval cathedral contains several historic furnishings and works of art. Its main altarpiece was donated to the cathedral in 1398, and it also contains Gothic choir stalls, bronzes and an astronomical clock from the 15th century (although heavily restored in 1923). When it was built, Lund Cathedral was lavishly decorated with Romanesque stone sculptures. It also contains late medieval stone sculptures from the time of Adam van Düren's renovation. After the Reformation the cathedral was also equipped with a decorated pulpit. Of more recent date is the large mosaic in the apse, by Joakim Skovgaard, installed in 1927. Lund Cathedral has six church organs, one of which is the largest in Sweden, and is also used as a concert venue.

== Historical background ==
Christian missionaries from present-day Germany and England were active in the Christianisation of Denmark, and vied for influence over the kingdom. Denmark eventually became part of the Archdiocese of Hamburg-Bremen. Lund was at the time part of Denmark. With the consolidation of Danish monarchy during the second half of the 11th century, and with a political crisis in continental Europe, there arose an opportunity for the Danish monarchs to bypass the German influence over church policy in Denmark. An episcopal see was created in Lund in 1060. At the same time, another see was created in Dalby, close to Lund, where Dalby Church was built adjacent to what was possibly a royal palace. However, when the first bishop of Lund (Henry of Lund) died, the erstwhile bishop of Dalby, Egino, was installed in Lund and Dalby abandoned as the seat of a bishop. At the same time, in 1103, Lund was proclaimed an archiepiscopal see overseeing all Nordic countries.

The cathedral was not the first church to be built in Lund; the earliest churches (now vanished) were built in the city at the end of the 10th century. Some kind of rudimentary settlement probably existed at the site of Lund Cathedral at the end of the 10th and early 11th centuries, but no remains of buildings have been found there. Lund Cathedral is one of the oldest stone buildings still in use in Sweden. During the Middle Ages, the cathedral was surrounded by several buildings serving the diocese, of which only Liberiet, which at one point served as a library, survives.

== History ==
=== Foundation and construction ===
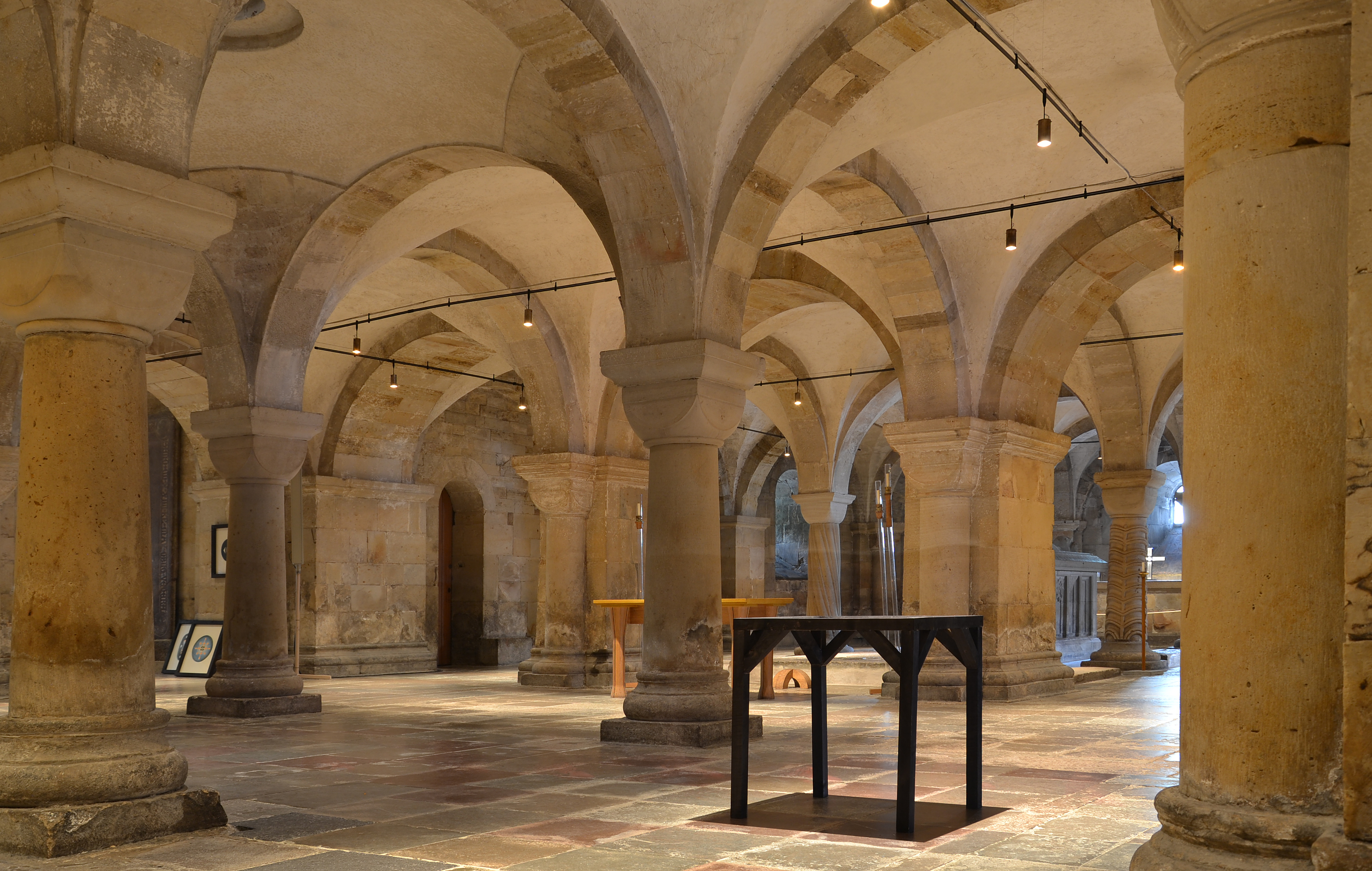
The crypt, the oldest part of Lund Cathedral.

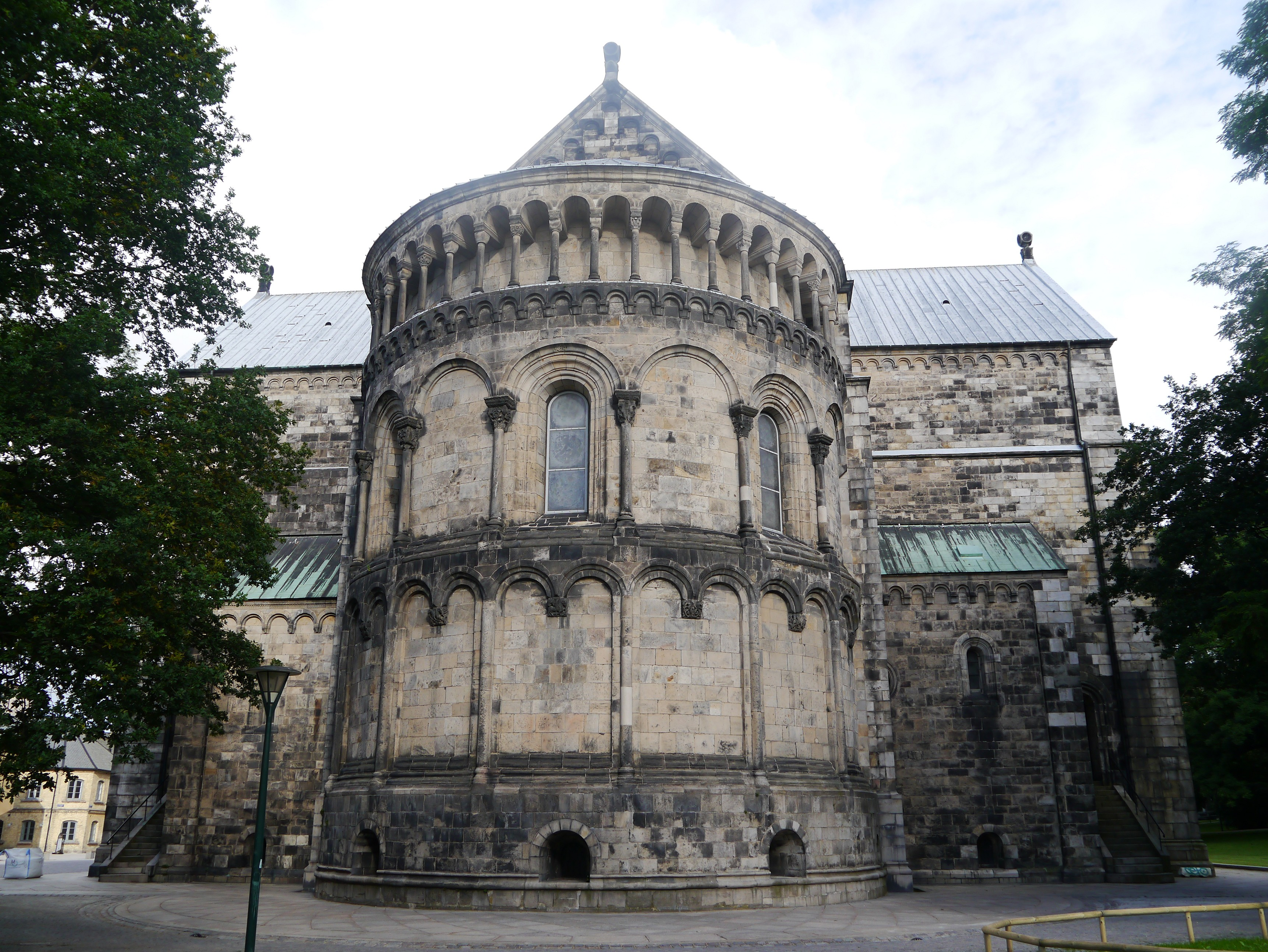
The apse is the best-preserved part of the original exterior.

The earliest written mention of a church in Lund dedicated to Saint Lawrence – the patron saint of Lund Cathedral during the Middle Ages – dates from 1085. Slightly later sources mention both a new and an old church dedicated to Saint Lawrence. During the 1940s, archaeological excavations in the cathedral uncovered the foundations of another church inside the present building. The exact age, shape and function of this predecessor to the cathedral has been a matter of some debate. Most scholars believe that construction of a church on the site of Lund Cathedral was begun sometime during the second half of the 11th century. Some time thereafter a new church was begun in almost the same place, but to a larger design in the form of the present cathedral. Parts of the earlier church may have been incorporated in the walls of the cathedral. The decision to abandon Dalby as a bishopric and make Lund the sole archbishopric in Scandinavia may have prompted the change of plans.

Apart from the obscurity which thus surrounds the very beginning of the history of the cathedral, the construction of Lund Cathedral is probably among the most well documented among any Romanesque churches. Two contemporary accounts of the building of the cathedral, in the form of the illuminated manuscripts Necrologium Lundense and Liber daticus vetustior, are still preserved in the library of Lund University. Both books contain notes, written in Latin, with dates of the progression of the construction. The oldest part of the cathedral is the large crypt. Its main altar was inaugurated on 30 June 1123, followed by the north (1126) and south (1131) side altars of the crypt. Only then did the cathedral begin to be used. One of the main functions of the crypt appears to have been as a place where baptisms were conducted. The main altar of the cathedral was dedicated to Saint Mary and Saint Lawrence on 1 September 1145, by the second archbishop of Lund, Eskil, in a ceremony attended by bishops from present-day Germany, Denmark and Sweden. By then, the construction of the cathedral to more or less its present dimensions was complete.

Unusually for that time, the architect of the cathedral is known by his name, Donatus. The name appears in both the Necrologium Lundense (as "Donatus architectus") and the Liber daticus vetustior. Donatus may have been responsible for the layout of the crypt and the cathedral above ground as far west as the current north and south portals of the cathedral, although it is difficult to draw any definitive conclusions about his precise role. The same is true for his successor, possibly a builder named Ragnar. The building erected during the time of Donatus and his successor show clear influences from Romanesque architecture in Lombardy, conveyed via the Rhine Valley. Donatus himself appears to have been from, or at least educated in, Lombardy. Speyer Cathedral in western Germany is stylistically closely related to Lund Cathedral (especially the crypt), and it has been proposed that Donatus came to Lund from Speyer, where construction more or less ceased in 1106 following the death of Emperor Henry IV. Similarities have also frequently been pointed out between Lund Cathedral and Mainz Cathedral, and the design of the apse is similar to that of the Basilica of Saint Servatius in Maastricht. On a more general level, the origins of the style of Lund Cathedral can be found in Basilica of Sant'Ambrogio (Milan), Modena Cathedral and several churches in Pavia, all in northern Italy. Similar stylistic influences can be seen in other cathedrals in Denmark from the same time, for example in Ribe Cathedral.

The building of Lund Cathedral must have involved a large number of people and was a collective undertaking. Comparable but somewhat later workshops at Cologne Cathedral and Uppsala Cathedral employed a workforce of about 100 and 60 people, respectively. The project was instrumental in establishing a workshop where local craftsmen could be educated, and thus disseminating artistic influences from continental Europe to Scandinavia. The stone sculptors Carl stenmästare, Mårten stenmästare and Majestatis were probably all Scandinavians who were educated at the construction site. Many early Romanesque stone churches in the countryside, particularly in Scania but also in the rest of present-day Denmark and Sweden, show direct influences from Lund Cathedral, notably Vä Church (Scania). Other examples are e.g. Valby Church (Zealand), Lannaskede Old Church (Småland), Hogstad Church (Östergötland) and Havdhem Church (Gotland).

=== Fire and repairs ===
The plan and layout of the building consecrated in 1145 was similar to the one seen today. A noticeable difference was that the entire choir was separated from the nave by a wall and reserved for the clergy. The towers were also not built until a few decades later. The intention was probably to provide the cathedral with vaults, but instead a flat wooden ceiling was installed. The cathedral was adorned with wall paintings and almost certainly by stained glass windows, but none of these remain. In 1234, the cathedral was heavily damaged by a large fire. Large donations were made to the church in the following years, to allow for repairs. Even so, the need for repairs was continuous for the entire 13th century. Following the fire, the burnt-out ceiling was replaced by brick vaults. Changes were also made to the layout of the westernmost part of the building. A conflict erupted between King Christopher I of Denmark and Archbishop Jakob Erlandsen in 1257 partially because the choir had been enlarged and the seats of the royal family moved, itself a testimony of the growing power of the Church. Two chapels were added to the cathedral during the 14th and 15th centuries; one located adjacent to the two westernmost bays of the south aisle of the nave, and the other as a western extension of the south transept. Buttresses were also added piecemeal to the building during the 13th and 14th centuries, to stabilise the building which was under strain from the new, heavier vaults, the added chapels and the constant ringing of the 8.5 tonne church bell.

=== Changes by Adam van Düren and later ===
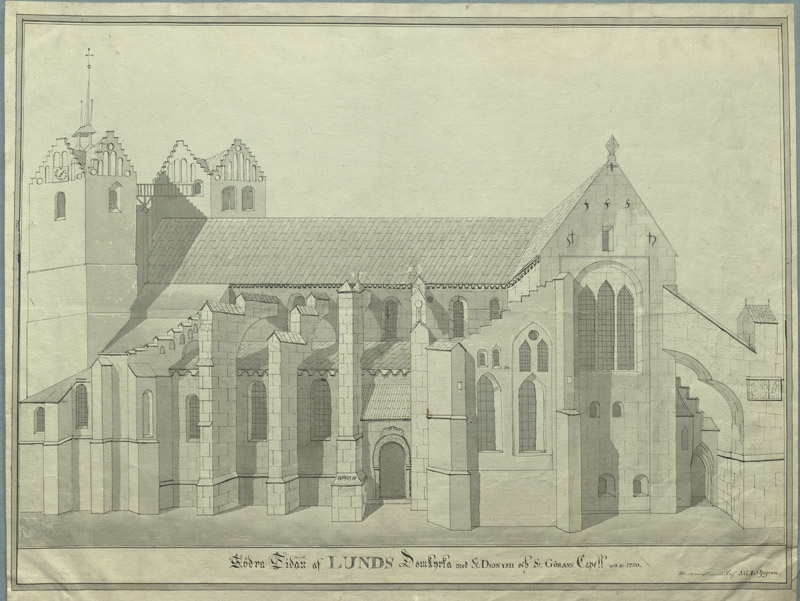
A drawing of the cathedral as it appeared in 1750

The German sculptor and builder Adam van Düren apparently worked intermittently at restoring and altering the cathedral between c. 1506 or 1507 and 1524. Despite, and to some extent because of, the work that had been done during the preceding centuries since the great fire of 1234, the cathedral was in need of a thorough restoration. Adam van Düren and his workshop made several changes and contributions. A new drainage system was installed in the crypt, and as part of that work a well, which probably replaced an earlier well in the same location, was decorated with satirical allegories. The workshop of van Düren also created two new windows in the choir, built a large buttress to support the southern transept (before 1513), and rebuilt the gable of the northern transept (1524) as well as its vaults. New and considerably larger windows with pointed arches were installed in both the northern wall of the north transept and in the southern wall of the south transept. The towers and western facade were also repaired in 1512–18 and again in 1527. It has been argued that the cathedral may have collapsed, were it not for the work done by van Düren.

Following the Reformation in the 16th century, the diocese lost much of its revenues. The building was still subjected to much stress, not least by the use of the large church bell, and suffered during the recurrent wars between Denmark and Sweden; in 1658 Lund permanently became part of Sweden. Despite van Düren's repairs, the church was described as being "very dilapidated" in 1682. During the 18th century, the chapels of the church were used for funerals, but also as an improvised morgue where corpses were occasionally left for several years. Attempts at repairs were made; among them the entire apse was dismantled and then re-erected. Many of the repairs were however either temporary or outright detrimental to the condition of the building. King Gustav III of Sweden visited the cathedral crypt in 1785 and expressed his displeasure at its state. In 1812, the aforementioned chapels from the 14th and 15th centuries were demolished.

=== Changes by Carl Georg Brunius and Helgo Zettervall ===
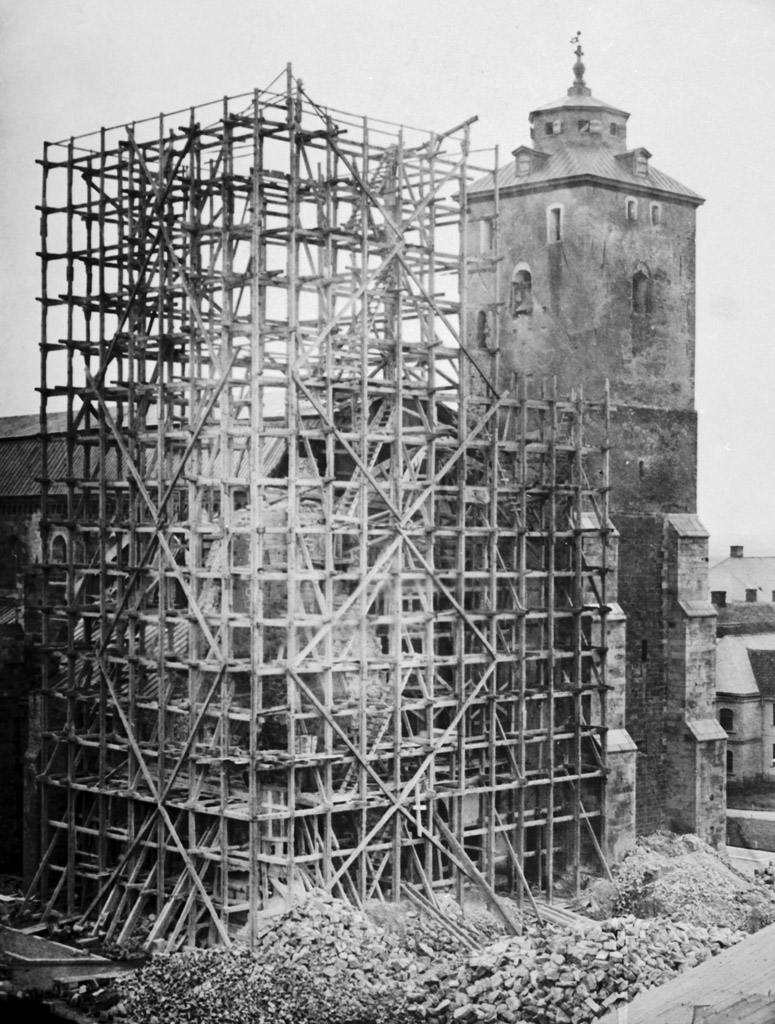
Demolition of the north tower of the cathedral during the time of Helgo Zettervall.

When the congregation wanted to build a new church organ in the early 19th century, architect Axel Nyström was invited to examine the structure in 1832. Nyström recommended a complete renovation of the cathedral. The chairman of the council in charge of administering the cathedral buildings, Carl Georg Brunius, was called to execute the plans of Nyström, and he did so while at the same time making changes according to his own convictions. He also wrote the first systematic art history of the cathedral. Brunius had the organ moved, the crypt repaired, installed a set of steps connecting the choir with the nave and improved the drainage system. He also removed modern furnishings, re-built some of the buttresses and changed the stone of a large part of the facade. Brunius retired due to old age in 1859, but as there was still a substantial need for repairs, the young architect Helgo Zettervall was appointed to carry out the rest of the work in 1860. A conflict between Brunius and Zettervall developed almost immediately, but Zettervall would keep working on restoring the cathedral until 1893 and ultimately managed to implement most of his ideas for the cathedral. A compromise in 1862 proposed that the Danish architect Ferdinand Meldahl would assume the main responsibility, and Zettervall would merely assist Meldahl. However, it soon became apparent that Zettervall would not accept a subordinate role and Meldahl himself showed little interest in the project. In 1862, Zettervall traveled extensively through Germany and Italy to study stylistically related architecture, and also to visit the latest examples of building restoration so that he could draw upon that experience in his work at Lund. In 1863, he presented a first proposal for a complete restoration of the cathedral. Zettervall himself considered it a "reasonable middle ground between reparation and reconstruction". The proposal would mean the removal of all buttresses, a new roof, completely rebuilt towers, and the removal of the large Gothic windows in the transepts. Zettervall also proposed to add an octagonal dome over the crossing. Far-reaching changes would also affect the interior. In the proposal Zettervall strove to reduce and refine the building volumes of the cathedral and create a unified composition of block-like elements.

The proposal by Zettervall was criticised, not least by Meldahl. Zettervall re-worked the proposal and put forward a revised, less far-reaching proposal in 1864, notably without the central dome. This proposal was also rejected and the plan for a complete overhaul abandoned; however it was at the same time decided that Zettervall would continue working on repairing the cathedral and every year make what changes that were deemed necessary. In this way, Zettervall could piecemeal over the next decades to rebuild the cathedral largely in line with his design from 1864.

Between 1832 and 1893, the cathedral was radically transformed by the work of Brunius and Zettervall. All windows were replaced, several vaults and pillars were repaired or rebuilt, and both architects effected extensive changes to the transept. Just as he had suggested, Zettervall had all the buttresses removed and demolished the entire western part of the church, including the towers, and rebuilt them according to his own Neo-Romanesque designs.

In the 20th century, archaeological excavations were carried out in and around the cathedral. The building also underwent a major restoration in 1954–1963, led by architect Eiler Græbe. During this time the decorative painting from the 19th century was removed. The large mosaic decorating the apse was installed in 1927, and designed by Joakim Skovgaard. In 1990, the layout of the choir was changed and the altar placed in the crossing. Pope Francis visited the cathedral on 31 October 2016 to observe the 499th anniversary of the beginning of the Reformation.

== Architecture and decoration ==
Lund Cathedral has been called "the most powerful representative of Romanesque architecture in the Nordic countries". It lies at some distance from any other buildings and dominates its surroundings. It consists of the two towers built by Zettervall, which flank the main entrance to the west. Behind them a nave with two aisles open up to a transept that is somewhat higher than the nave. A short flight of stairs thus connect the nave with the choir as well as with the crypt under the choir. The choir ends in an apse. Inside, the bays of the cathedral are supported by groin vaults. The number of bays in the aisles are the double of that in the nave. The arches that separate the nave from the aisles are supported by piers and pillars of alternating width. The crypt has over forty shallow groin vaults supported by pillars with cushion capitals. It is sparsely lit by low small windows and remains largely unchanged since 1123.

Seen from outside, the different elements of the building are clearly discernible as independent volumes, "as if they could be taken apart and put together again". The apse of the cathedral is a "forcefully articulated" semi-circle. Compared to its predecessors in Mainz, its composition is somewhat more elaborate with three distinct storeys each divided into fields, the lower by lesenes and the middle by columns with decorated capitals. The uppermost part is a gallery of shallow barrel vaults carried by 21 smaller columns, which open towards the exterior. The apse is the most well-preserved part of the Romanesque building and has been described as "the artistic high point of the exterior". The southern portal of the nave is perhaps the oldest of the cathedral. Five decorated archivolts supported by small columns with variously decorated capitals, frame a tympanon depicting the Lamb of God. The northern portal is slightly later and more richly decorated. Its tympanon depicts Samson wrestling with the lion. Two bronze doors built by Carl Johan Dyfverman serve as the main entrance in the centre of the west facade. They have 24 reliefs with subjects from the Bible, particularly the Old Testament. Above the doorway, the tympanon depicts Christ, Canute IV of Denmark and Saint Lawrence. The cathedral has two sacristies. The building material of the cathedral is mostly sandstone quarried in the area around Höör. The main walls are constructed as shells of sandstone filled with fieldstone mixed with lime mortar. The thickness of the walls is around 2 to 3 metres (6.6 to 9.8 ft).

Overview of Lund Cathedral

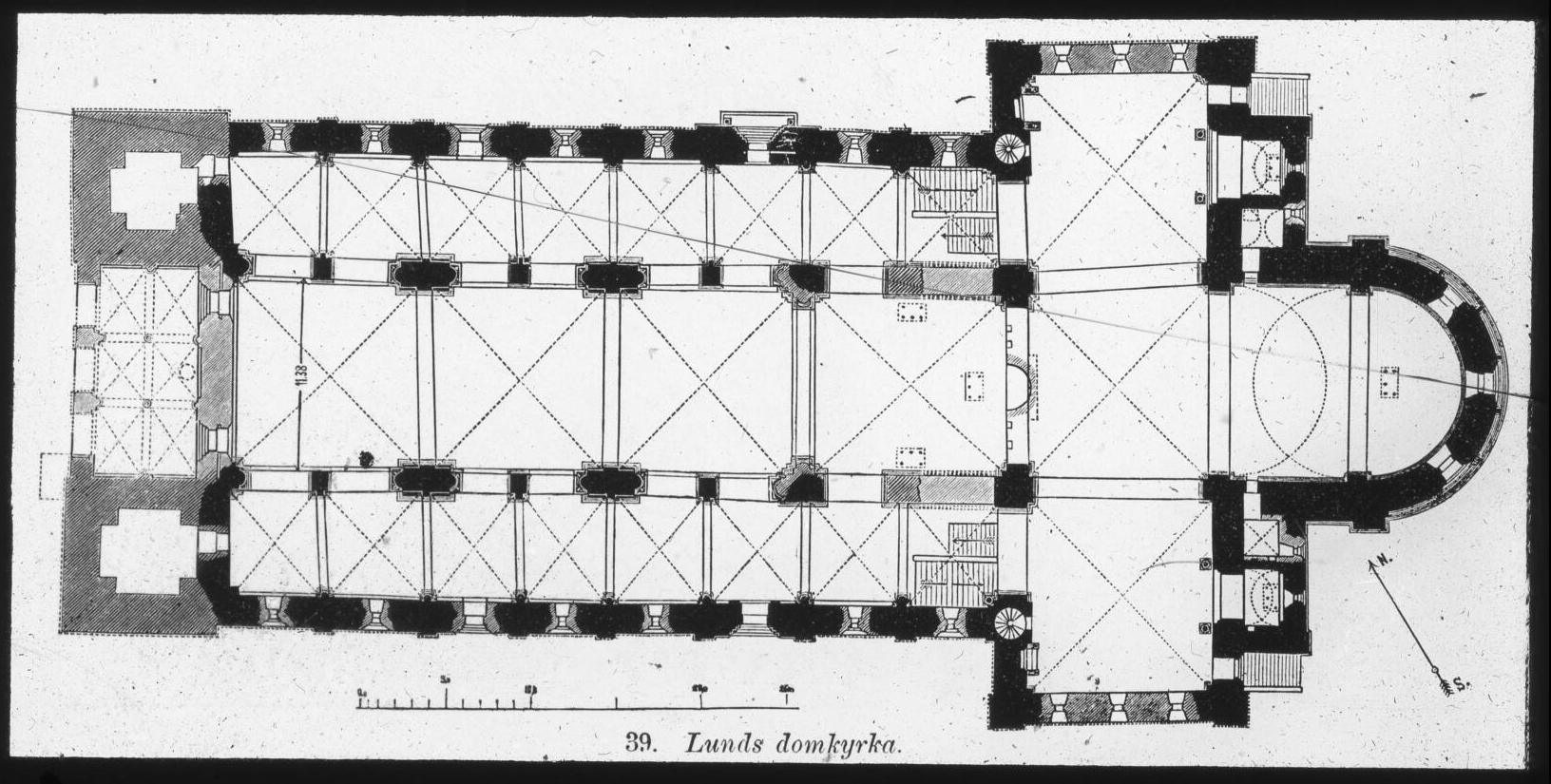
Plan c. 1200.

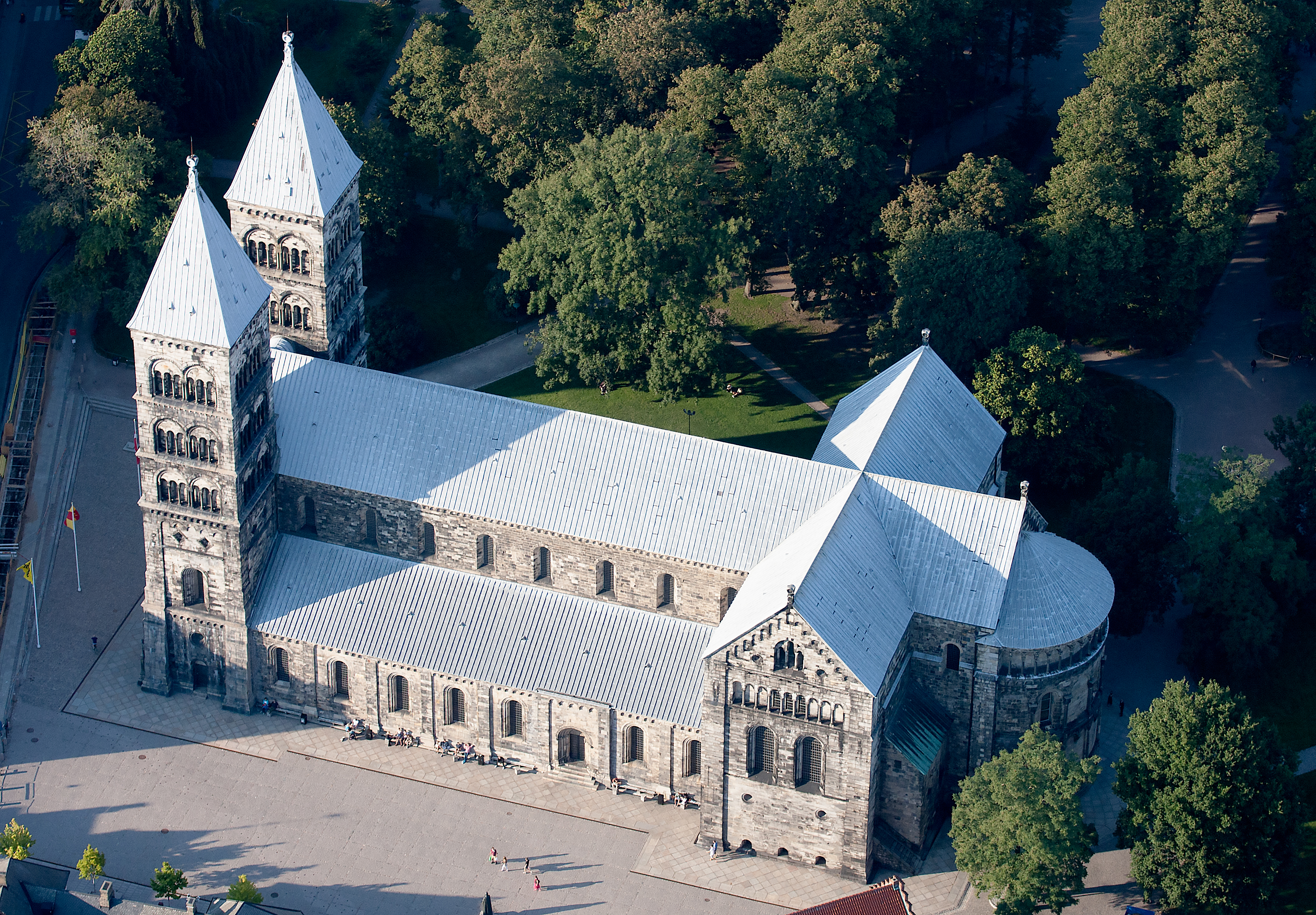
Aerial view from the south east

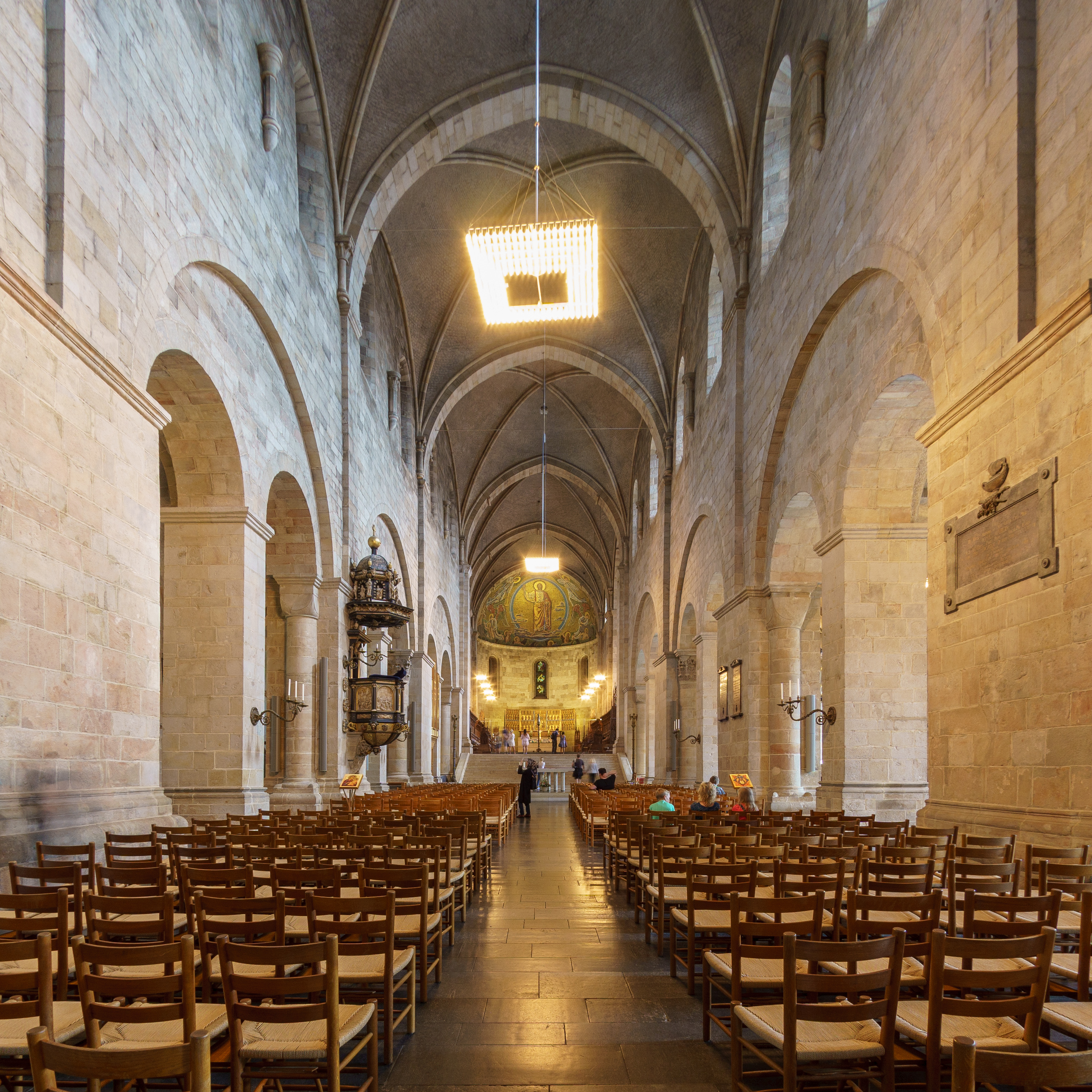
View from the entrance towards east

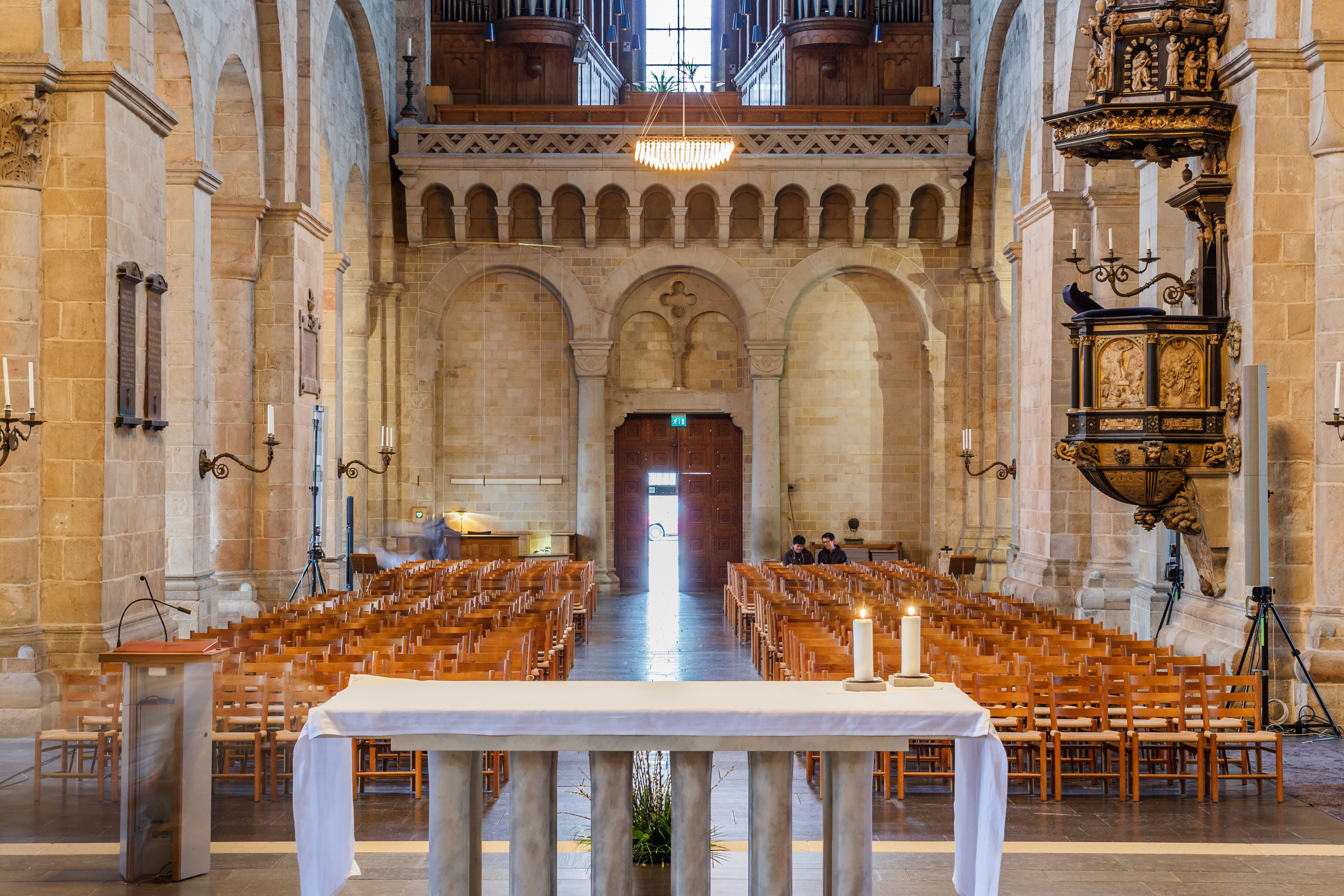
View from the altar towards west

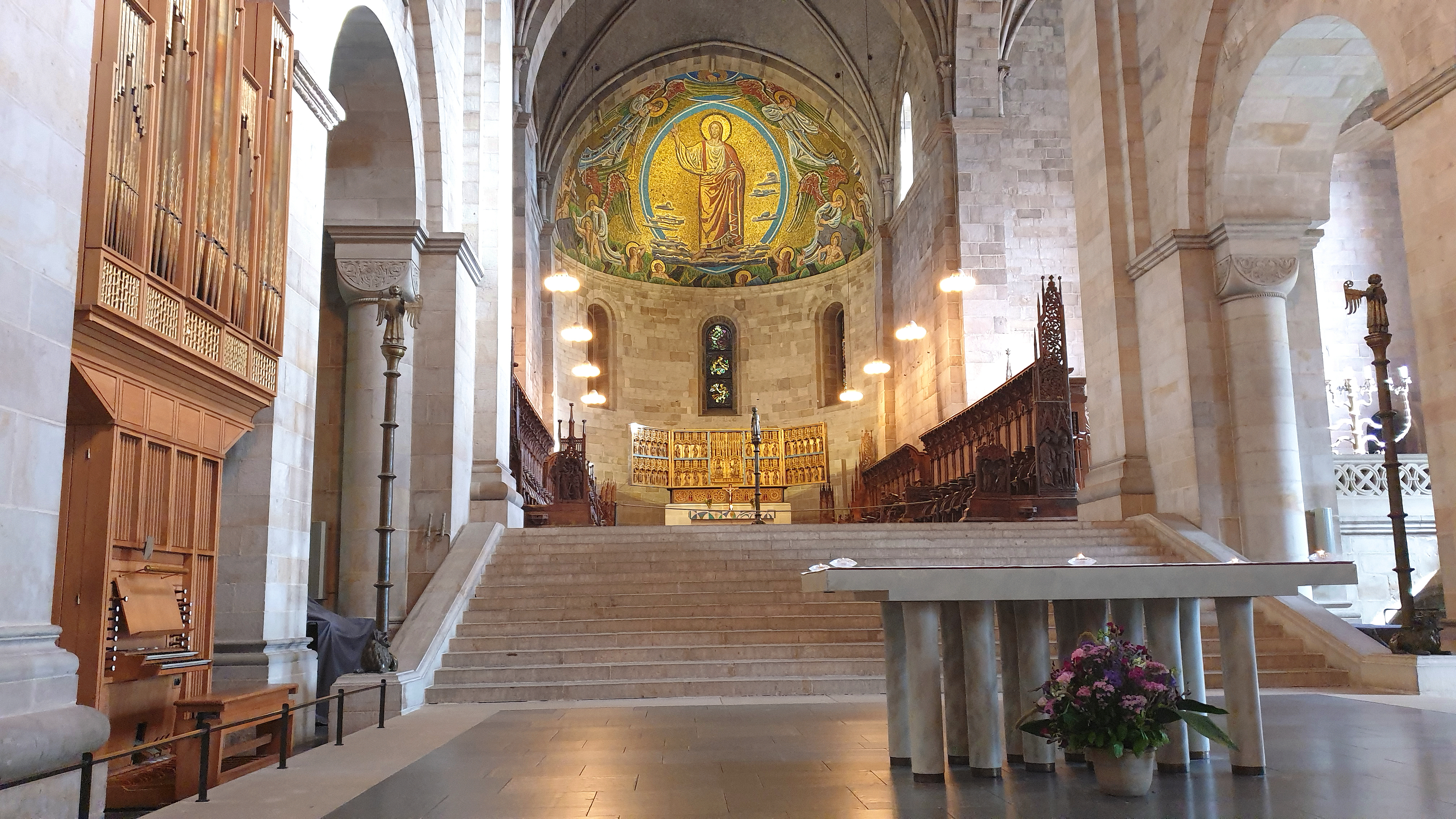
View towards the choir and apse

=== Sculptures ===
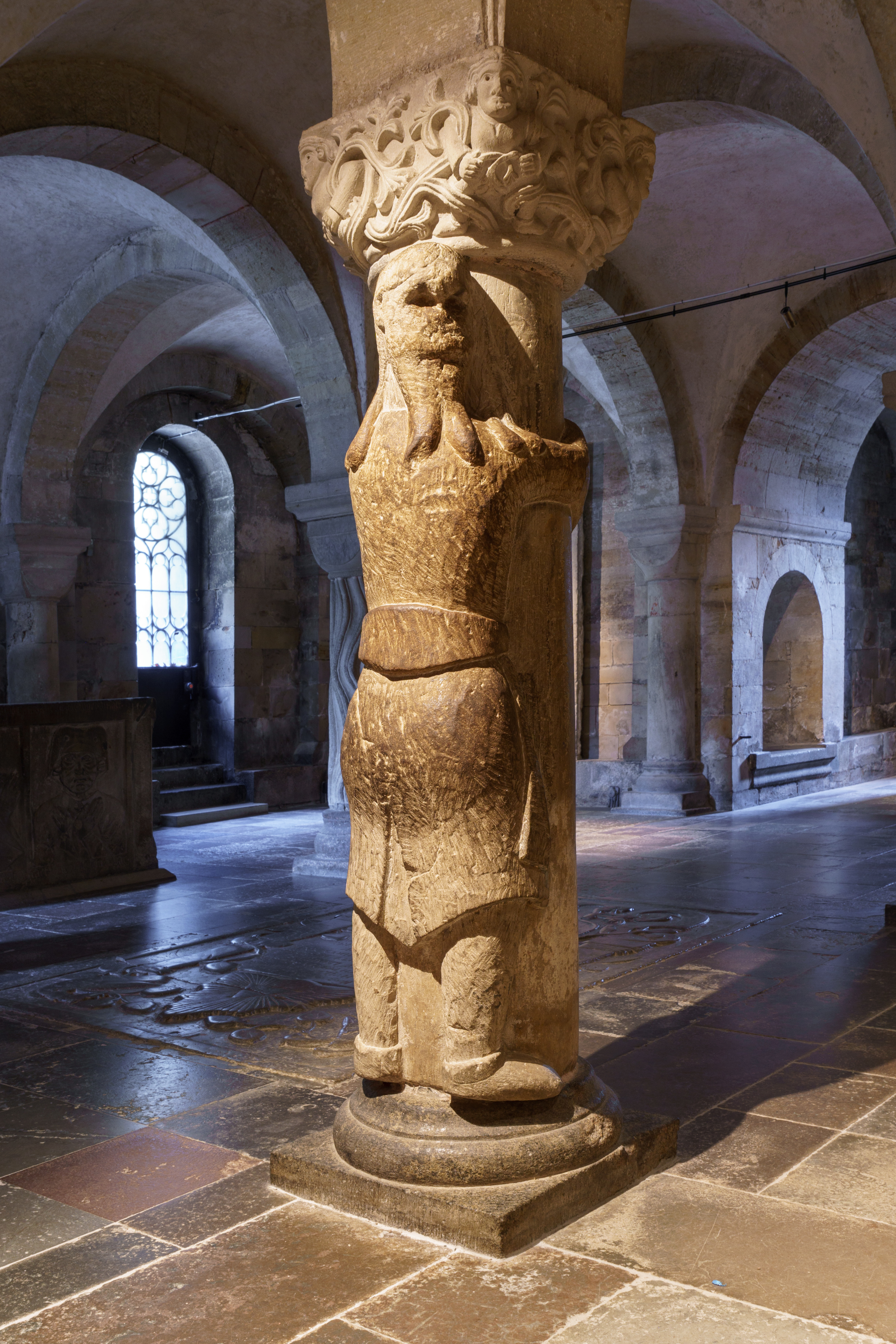
"The giant Finn and his wife" in the crypt, probably a depiction of the biblical hero Samson.

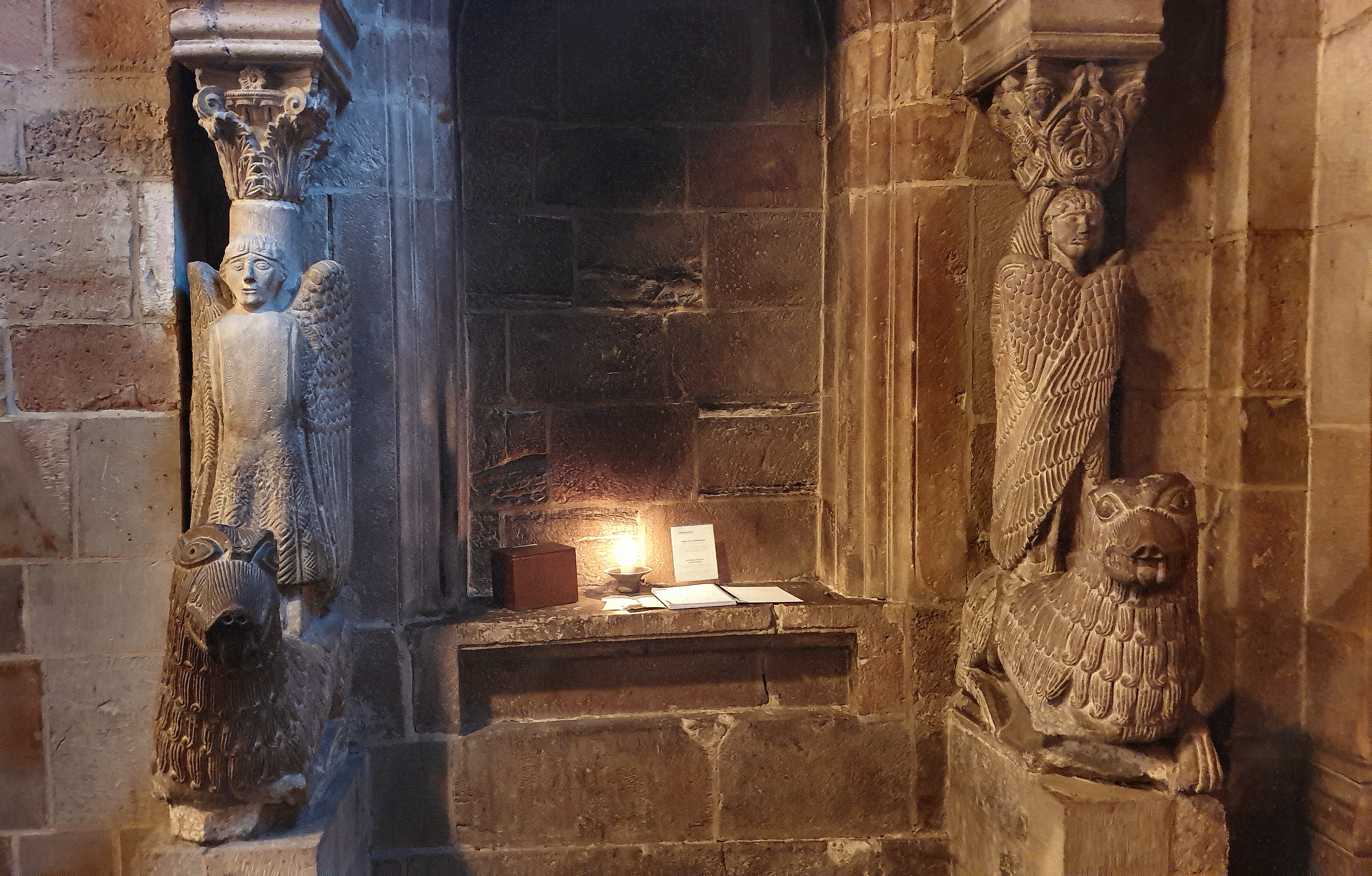
Sculpture. Lions and seraphim.

When it comes to stone sculpture, Lund Cathedral was the most lavishly decorated Romanesque building to be built in the Nordic countries, according to art historian Jan Svanberg, and its sculptures are of recognised high artistic quality. Perhaps the most well-known and striking of these are the sculptures of two figures traditionally called "The giant Finn and his wife" in the crypt. According to a local legend, the giant helped build the cathedral, and when he was not paid for his services he tried to destroy it by shaking the pillars, but was petrified. The larger of the two figures is embracing a column, while the smaller is attached to another column with a rope. These sculptures have probably been the subject of more attempts at an explanation than any other medieval artworks in Sweden, according to art historian Mereth Lindgren. Most scholars today believe the larger sculpture depicts Samson, but what the smaller figure is supposed to represent is not known. The sculptures date from the construction of the crypt but have been treated poorly, especially during the 18th century, and lost much of their original detailing.

The fluted columns also found in the crypt are similar in style to English Norman architecture and may indicate that the very first artistic influences came from the area bordering the English Channel. Apart from these columns however, the rich stone ornamentation is clearly Lombardic in style, meaning related to north Italian art of the period. Among these is a baldachin now immured in the east wall of the north transept which may have been part of the original western facade; Its columns have Corinthian capitals and support a richly decorated archivolt on which traces of original paint survives. Opposite, in the south wall, is a smaller baldachin where the columns themselves are sculpted angels (one with feather tights) standing on lions. Similar sculptures exist in Como and Modena in northern Italy. In addition, the capitals of the columns in the church are all of high artisanal quality, and can be broadly divided into two groups displaying either Classical or Byzantine influences. Apart from its rich Romanesque decoration, Lund Cathedral also contains several late medieval sculptures made by Adam van Düren, as mentioned above. Several of these are of animals and contain inscriptions in Low German. A relief in the south transept displaying the Woman of the Apocalypse flanked by Saint Lawrence and Saint Canute is similar to the portal relief van Düren made a couple of years earlier at Glimmingehus.

=== Altarpiece ===
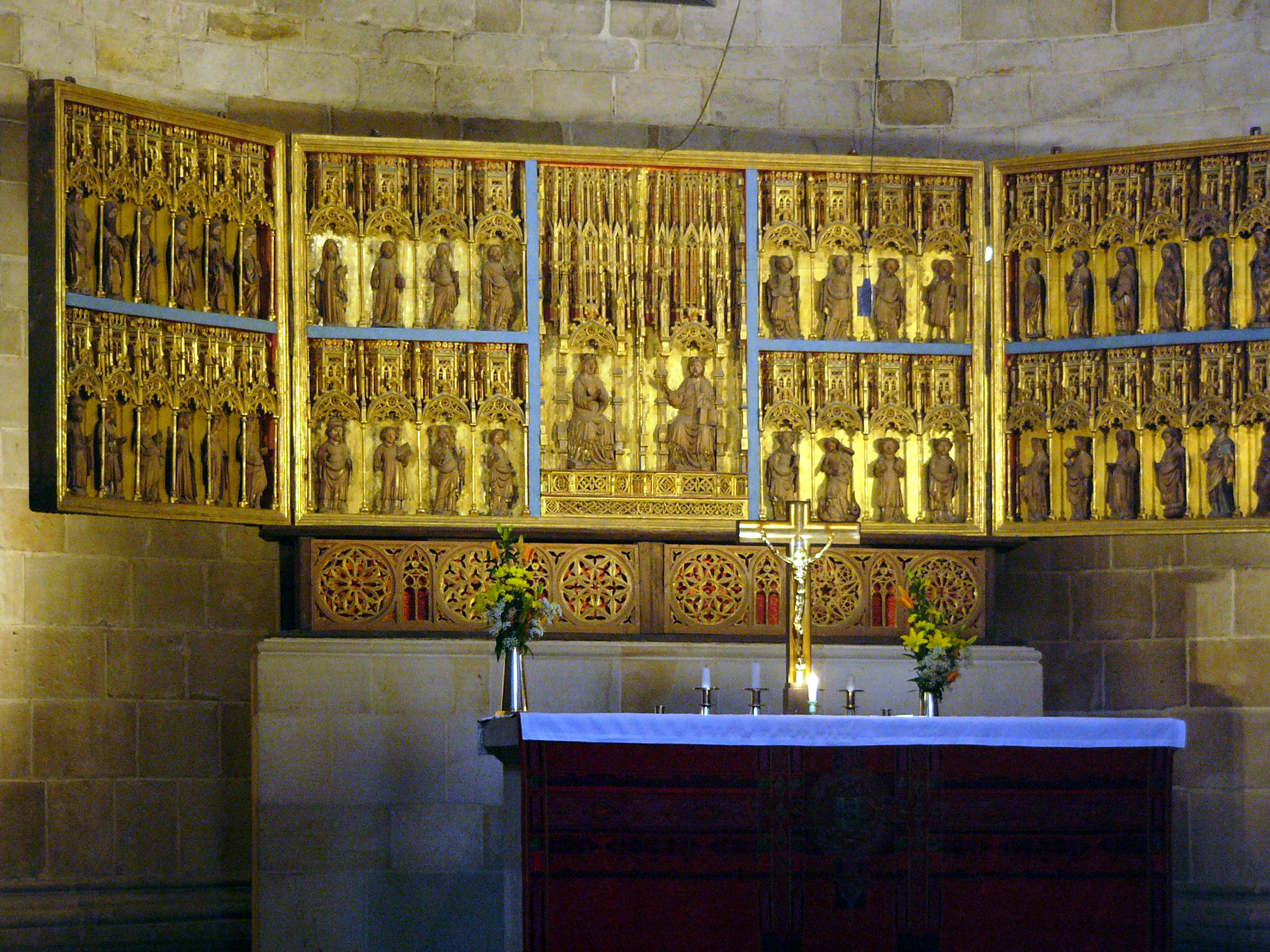
The main altarpiece, donated to the cathedral in 1398 by Ide Pedersdatter Falk

The medieval main altarpiece was donated to the cathedral in 1398 by Ide Pedersdatter Falk. The altarpiece is one of a group of stylistically similar altarpieces and made in some north Germany city, probably by Master Bertram or in his workshop. Its central panel depicts the Coronation of the Virgin, surrounded by two rows of 40 saints, 26 of which are original. Twelve figures have been taken from other medieval altarpieces, while two of the added figures are from the 17th century. The altarpiece is 7.6 metres (25 ft) wide but is missing an original pair of wings.

=== Choir stalls ===
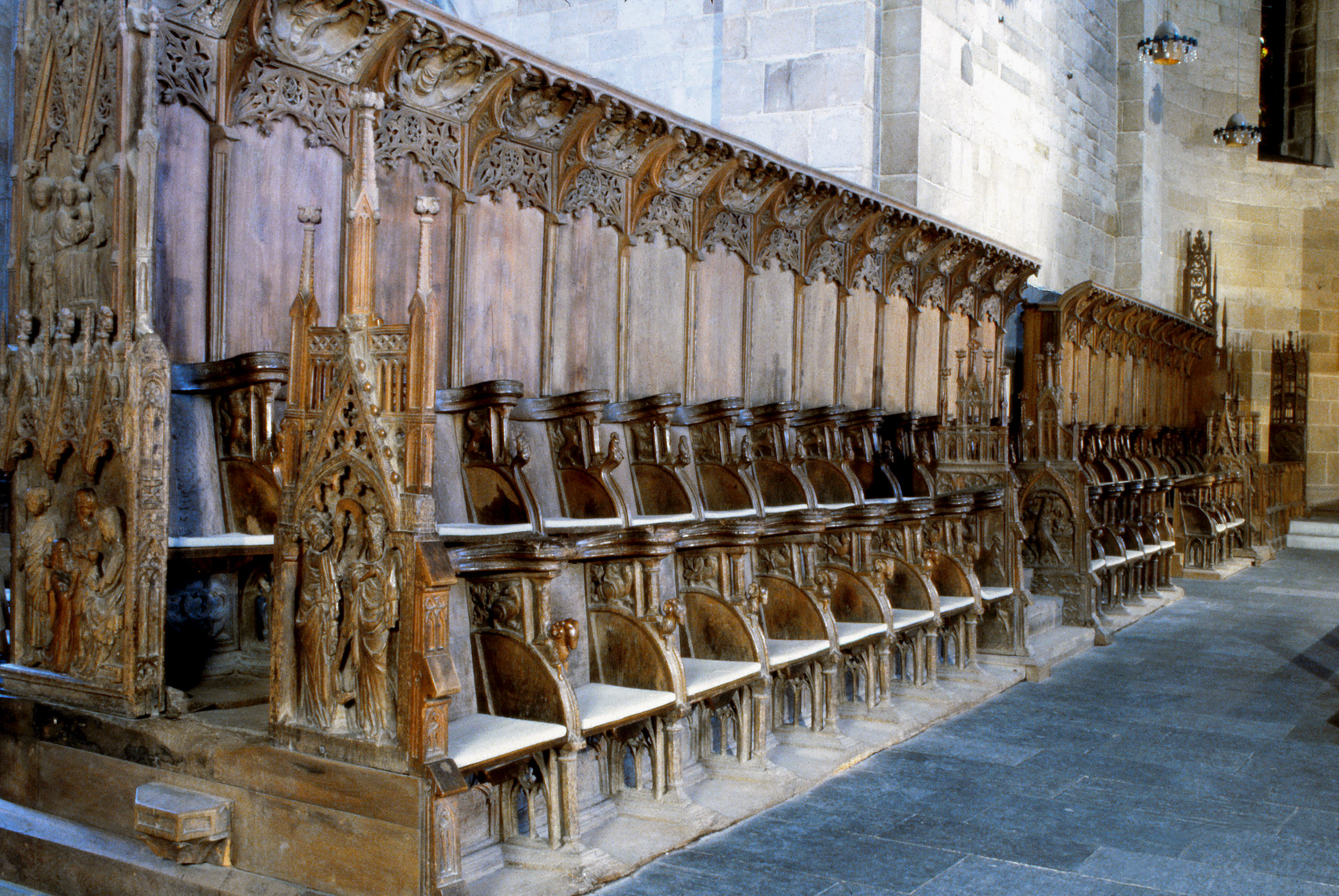
View of the choir stalls on the north side of the chancel

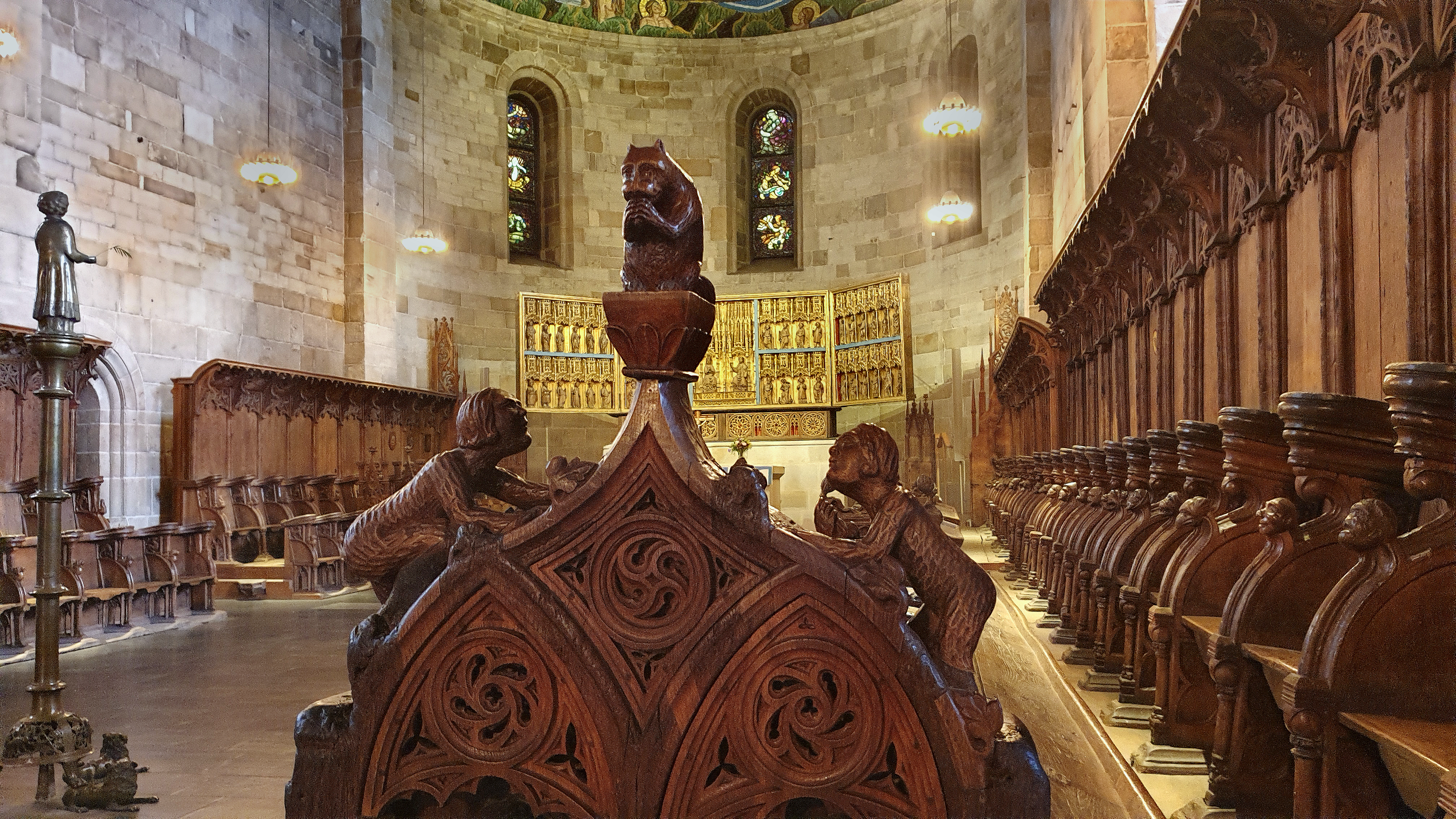
View of the choir stalls on the south side of the chancel, detail.

The choir contains two rows of medieval choir stalls made of Scanian oak wood, containing in total 78 seats. The wooden stalls date from the end of the 14th century, probably commissioned by archbishop Nils Jönson some time between 1361 and 1379. Clearly made by several different wood carvers, they are approximately 3 metres (9.8 ft) tall without their gables and decorated with carved details. These are biblical scenes from both the Old and New Testament, but the stalls also contain misericords portraying animals and other small details. Their style is High Gothic and they are stylistically linked with contemporary art from the Rhine Valley. They are among the largest wooden Gothic sculptures to survive in the Nordic countries, and have been described as being of internationally high quality. The choir stalls in Lund Cathedral also lent stylistic inspiration to the choir stalls in Roskilde Cathedral and St. Bendt's Church, Ringsted.

Slightly older than the choir stalls is a bishop's throne which survives in a damaged state and is placed in the south transept. It is somewhat similar in construction to the choir stalls but stylistically different and more closely related to contemporary art from north Germany. Currently placed next to the bishop's chair is also a Gothic tabernacle in the form of a 5 metres (16 ft) tall, decorated wooden pillar. It contains two cabinets surmounted by a statuette of a female saint and crowned by a hexagonal spire. The tabernacle was repaired by Brunius in the 19th century. The saint may be Ida of Toggenburg.

=== Astronomical clock ===
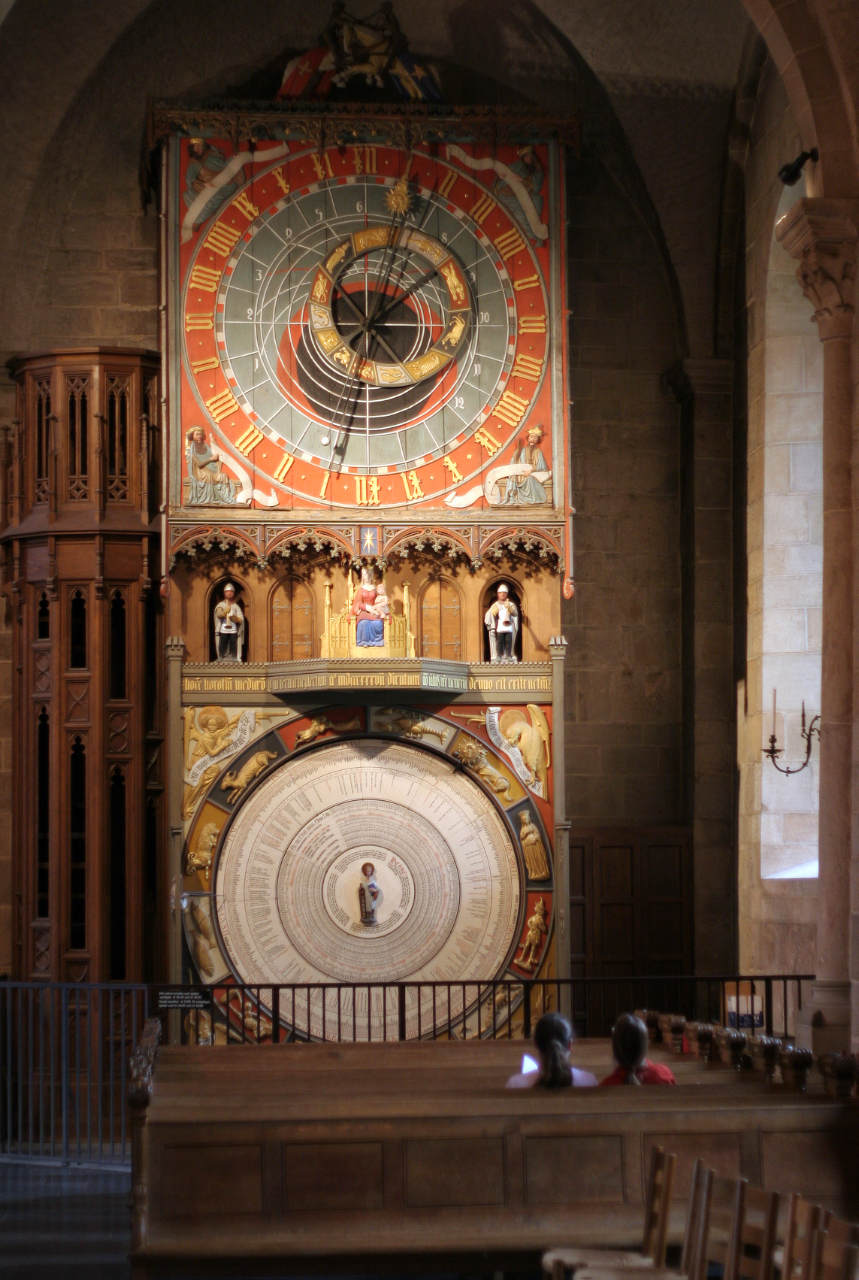
The astronomical clock

The astronomical clock of Lund Cathedral, presently located at the west end of the north aisle, dates from the late Middle Ages and was installed in Lund Cathedral c. 1425. In 1837, it was dismantled. It was restored at the initiative of architect Theodor Wåhlin and the Danish clockmaker Julius Bertram Larsen and re-inaugurated in 1923. The upper part, which is original, is the clock, while the lower part, a reconstruction, is a calendar. Twice every day the two knights on the top clash their swords. The clock then plays the tune In dulci jubilo and a procession of figures representing the three Kings with their servants parade across the face of the clock. Similar clocks from approximately the same period are known from several churches in towns in the south Baltic Sea area. Especially the clocks in Doberan Minster and St. Nicholas Church, Stralsund are very similar, and it is possible that the clockmaker Nikolaus Lilienfeld who made the clock in Stralsund also made the clock in Lund. The clock was repaired 2009–2010.

A decorated conventional clock from 1623 is immured on the opposite side of the nave, in the west wall of the south aisle.

=== Bronzes ===
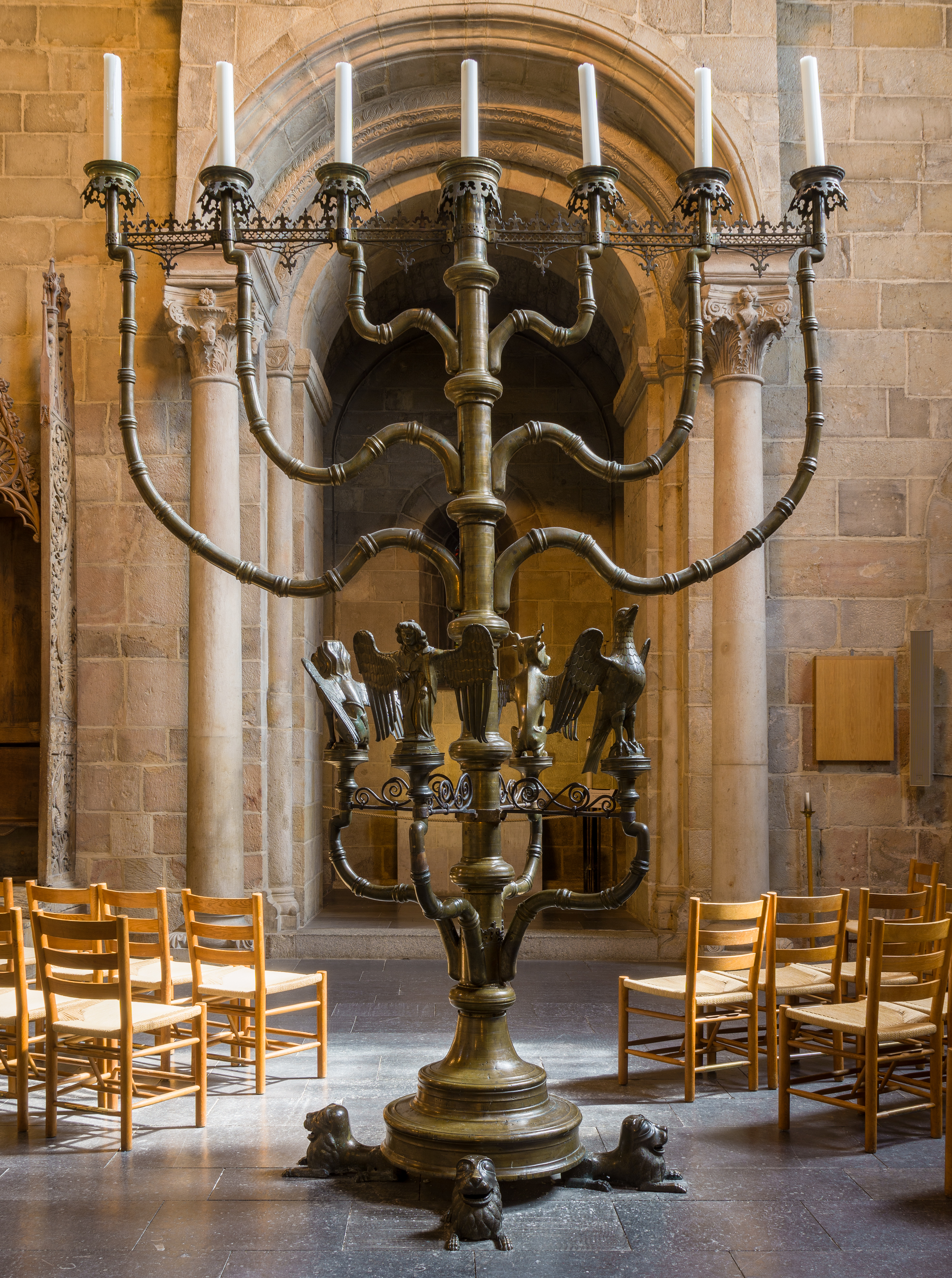
The 15th-century seven-branched bronze candelabrum

The cathedral also owns three High Gothic bronze columns carrying statuettes, the oldest remaining furnishings in the cathedral, and a seven-branched candelabrum from the end of the Middle Ages. Two of the bronze columns are crowned by angels, and the third one by a statuette of Saint Lawrence, holding a gridiron, the symbol of his martyrdom. It probably dates from the middle of the 14th century, while the two angel-bearing columns may be somewhat later. Saint Lawrence's column is approximately 3 metres (9.8 ft) tall (and the saint 70 centimetres (28 in)), while the columns with angels are slightly smaller. The three columns were probably made in Lübeck or Hamburg. Presently located in the south transept is also the 3.5 metres (11 ft) tall seven-branched candelabrum or candle holder from the late 15th century, manufactured by Harmen Bonstede in Hamburg. It was supplied to the cathedral in a dismantled state, and traces of its assembly instruction are still discernible on the candelabrum. Similar candelabra were installed in a number of Scandinavian cathedrals at approximately the same time; although the one in Lund is larger than those in the cathedrals of Aarhus, Ribe, Viborg and Stockholm.

=== Pulpit ===
The current pulpit was commissioned at the end of the 16th century and is marked with the date 1592. The artist was Johannes Ganssog from Frankfurt an der Oder in present-day Germany. It is attached with unusual technical skill to one of the pillars of the nave, and it is entered through a stair cut inside the pillar. The building material is sandstone, black limestone and black and white marble, and it is partially painted and gilded. Reliefs of alabaster on the side show scenes from the New Testament.

=== Graves and funerary monuments ===
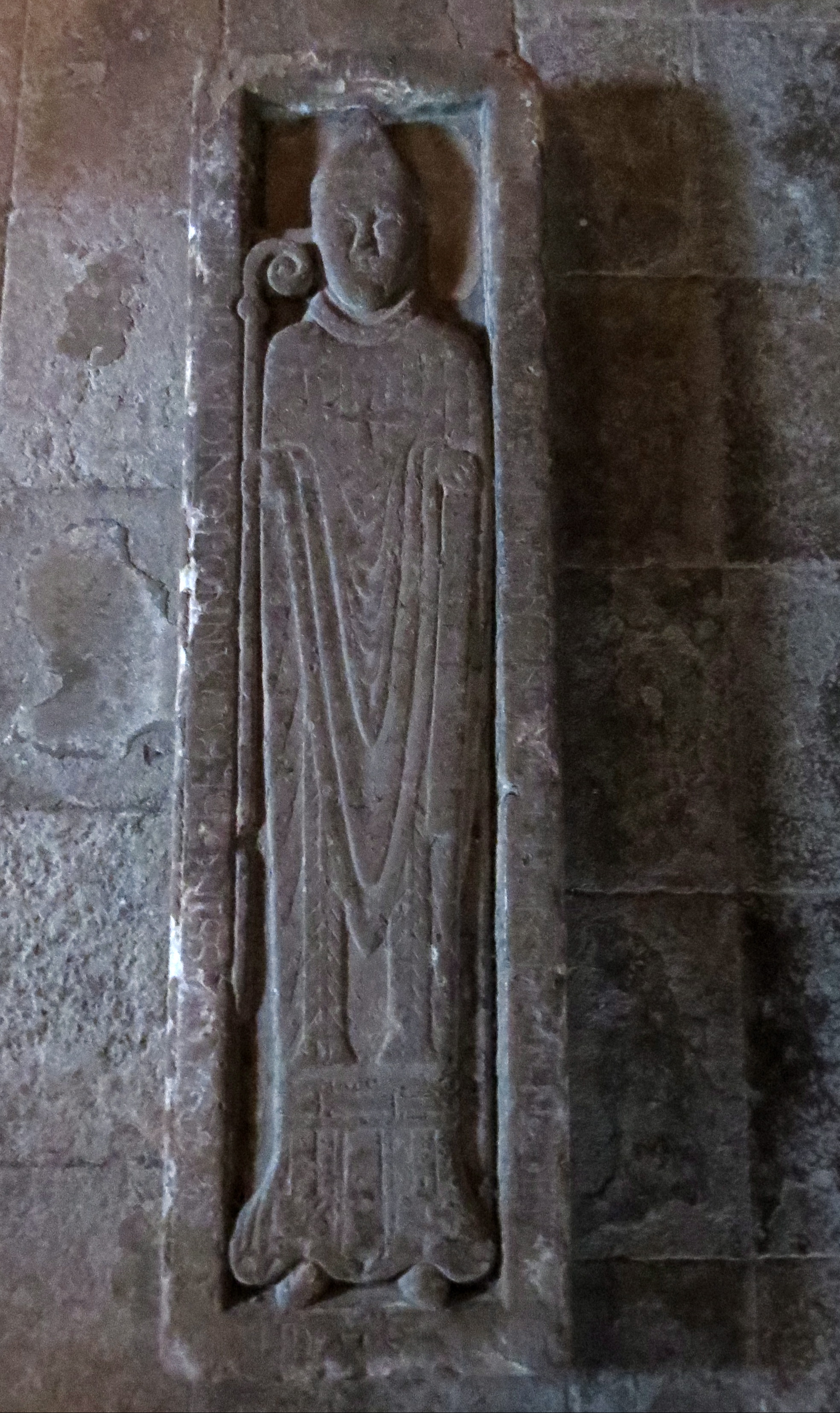
The grave of Hermann of Schleswig, 12th century, the oldest grave in the crypt.

Several people have been buried in the cathedral. The crypt contains the oldest grave in the cathedral, the grave of Hermann of Schleswig, who played an important role as an emissary of archbishop Ascer of Lund to the Pope and who may have written parts of the aforementioned Necrologium Lundense. The simple Romanesque sarcophagus, which has an inscription in Latin and a depiction of the titular bishop, is located in the apse of the crypt. It dates from the middle of the 12th century. The crypt also contains the much larger grave monument of the last archbishop, Birger Gunnersen, which is centrally placed in the crypt. It is of a kind which is not unusual in continental Europe but very unusual in the Nordic countries: a large stone sarcophagus decorated on all sides with sculptures in high relief and with a full-scale depiction of the bishop in full dress on the lid. It was made by Adam van Düren in 1512. The cathedral's largest grave monument is that of bishop Hans Brostorp, who died in 1497 and who during his lifetime inaugurated the University of Copenhagen. The monument is made of limestone from Gotland and decorated in low relief.

The nave and the aisles contain several memorial plaques and epitaphs. Several commemorate bishops, such as Johan Engeström (1699–1777) and Nils Hesslén (1728–1811). Many others were made for professors at Lund University, e.g. Eberhard Rosenblad (1714–1796) and Erasmus Sack (1633–1697). The oldest epitaph of the cathedral commemorates the owner of Krageholm Castle Lave Brahe (1500–1567) and his wife Görvel Fadersdotter (Sparre) (1509 or 1517 – 1605).

=== Baptismal font ===
The baptismal font of the cathedral is a sparsely decorated Early Gothic font from the 13th century made of reddish grey limestone from Gotland. It is a paradise font with its quatrefoil-shaped bowl and a round-arch frieze.

== Flora ==
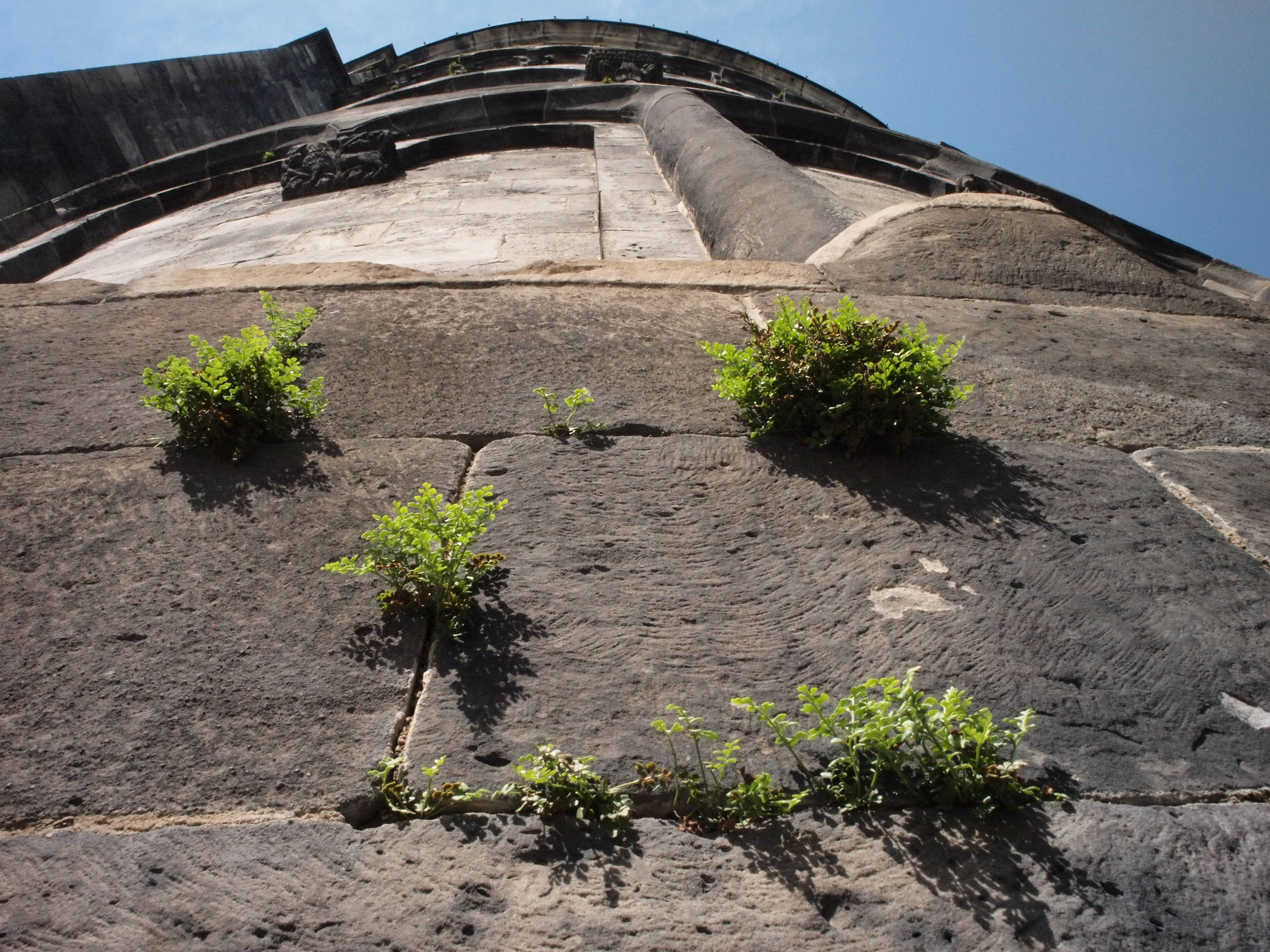
Wall-rue growing on the apse

Several surveys and descriptions of the flora of the cathedral, like the plants that grow on its walls, have been made. The first to describe the flora of the cathedral was Daniel Rolander, one of the apostles of Linnaeus, who made a list of the vascular plants, mosses and lichens he found growing on the building in 1771. It was rediscovered in the 20th century and published in 1931. Elias Magnus Fries also made observations about the flora of the cathedral during the first half of the 19th century. A more systematic surveys of the flora of the building was published in 1922. Lichenologist Ove Almborn made a survey of the lichen of the cathedral in 1935; it was incidentally his first scientific publication. The lichens of the cathedral were inventoried again in 1993. Of the species observed growing on the cathedral, the minute fern wall-rue (Asplenium ruta-muraria) was mentioned as early as 1756 by Anders Tidström and is perhaps the most conspicuous member of the cathedral flora. When the lichen flora was surveyed in 1993, 15 species were discovered. One of these, Lecanora perpruinosa, had not been observed in the province of Scania before.

== Relationship with Lund University ==
The founding of Lund University in 1666 was acknowledged in a ceremony in the cathedral in 1668. Following the Reformation, the choir was used for a long time as a classroom, first by Lund Cathedral School and later by the university. The university also used the choir to store its library for some time. The cathedral is still the place for the ceremony of the conferment of new doctor's degrees at the university.

== Music ==
The cathedral has five choirs for adults and two choirs for children. The cathedral is also frequently used for concerts.

There are currently six church organs in Lund Cathedral, including the largest church organ in Sweden. The gallery organ was built between 1932 and 1934 by the Danish company Marcussen & Søn and renovated by the same company in 1992. It has 102 stops distributed between four manuals and a pedalboard. There are 7,074 pipes in total. The smallest organ is inside the astronomical clock, where it plays In dulci jubilo.

== Works cited ==
- Bodin, Anders (2017). Helgo Zettervalls arkitektur: kyrkor [The architecture of Helgo Zettervall: churches] (PDF) (in Swedish). Vol. II. Stockholm: Carlssons bokförlag. ISBN 978-91-7331-785-6.
- Cinthio, Erik (1957). Lunds domkyrka under romansk tid [Lund Cathedral during the Romanesque era] (PDF) (in Swedish). Lund: C. W. K. Gleerup.
- Cinthio, Erik (1990). "Lunds domkyrkas förhistoria. S:t Laurentiuspatrociniet och Knut den Heliges kyrka än en gång" [The pre-history of Lund Cathedral. The patronage of St. Lawrence and the church of Canute the Holy once more] (PDF). Ale. Historisk Tidskrift för Skåne, Halland och Blekinge (in Swedish). 2: 1–13.
- Dunér, Uno (1984). "Gideon och ullen" [Gideon and the wool] (PDF). Ale. Historisk Tidskrift för Skåne, Halland och Blekinge (in Swedish). 3: 1–10.
- Gertz, Otto (1923). "Vegetationen å ruinerna av Alvastra klosterkyrka" [The vegetation on the ruins of Alvastra monastery church]. Botaniska Notiser (in Swedish): 457–463.
- Johansson, Per (1993). "Lavfloran på Lunds domkyrka" [The lichen flora of Lund Cathedral] (PDF). Svensk Botanisk Tidskrift (in Swedish) (87): 25–30.
- Lindgren, Mereth (1995). "Stenarkitekturen" [The stone architecture]. In Karlsson, Lennart (ed.). Signums svenska konsthistoria. Den romanska konsten [Signum's history of Swedish art. Romanesque art] (in Swedish). Lund: Signum. pp. 299–335. ISBN 91-87896-23-0.
- Rydbeck, Monica (1936). Skånes stenmästare före 1200 [The stone mason masters of Skåne before 1200] (in Swedish). Lund: C. W. K. Gleerups förlag. OCLC 888802816.
- Rydbeck, Otto (1915). Bidrag till Lunds domkyrkas byggnadshistoria [Contributions to the building history of Lund Cathedral]. Lund: C. W. K. Gleerup. OCLC 15548036.
- Rydbeck, Otto (1946). "Lunds domkyrka, byggnadens och dess inventariers historia enligt de nyaste forskningsresultaten" [Lund Cathedral, the history of the building and its furnishings according to the latest research]. In Newman, Ernst (ed.). Lunds domkyrkas historia 1145–1945 [History of Lund Cathedral 1145–1945] (in Swedish). Stockholm: Svenska kyrkans diakonistyrelses bokförlag. OCLC 1163629870.
- Rydén, Thomas (1998). "Lunds domkyrka, det universella rummet" [Lund Cathedral, the universal space]. In Wahlöö, Claes (ed.). Metropolis Daniae: ett stycke Europa [Metropolis Daniae: a piece of Europe] (PDF) (in Swedish). Stockholm: Lund University. ISSN 0454-5915.
- Schukowski, Manfred (2008). "Astronomiska ur i Hansatidens kyrkor" [Astronomical clocks in the churches of the Hanseatic era]. In Mogensen, Lone (ed.). Det underbara uret i Lund [The wonderful clock in Lund] (in Swedish). Lund: Historiska Media. ISBN 978-91-85507-93-1.
- Sundnér, Barbro (1997). "Byggnadshistoria" [Building history]. In Löfvendahl, Runo; Sundnér, Barbro (eds.). Lunds domkyrka: stenmaterial och skadebild [Lund Cathedral: stone material and damages] (PDF) (in Swedish). Stockholm: Riksantikvarieämbetet (Swedish National Heritage Board). ISBN 91-7209-006-5.
- Svanberg, Jan (1995). "Stenskulpturen" [The stone sculpture]. In Karlsson, Lennart (ed.). Signums svenska konsthistoria. Den romanska konsten [Signum's history of Swedish art. Romanesque art] (in Swedish). Lund: Signum. pp. 299–335. ISBN 91-87896-23-0.
- Svanberg, Jan (1996). "Stenskulpturen" [The stone sculpture]. In Augustsson, Jan-Erik (ed.). Signums svenska konsthistoria. Den gotiska konsten [Signum's history of Swedish art. Gothic art] (in Swedish). Lund: Signum. pp. 299–335. ISBN 91-87896-23-0.
- Ulvros, Eva Helen; Larsson, Anita (2012). Dokyrkan i Lund [The cathedral in Lund] (in Swedish). Lund: Historiska Media. ISBN 978-91-87031-34-2.
- Wahlöö, Claes (2014). Skånes kyrkor 1050-1949 [The churches of Skåne 1050–1949] (in Swedish). Kävlinge: Domus Propria. ISBN 978-91-637-5874-4.
- Wrangel, Ewert (1915). Konstverk i Lunds domkyrka [Art in Lund Cathedral]. Lund: C. W. K. Gleerup. OCLC 84313403.
- Wrangel, Ewert (1923). Lunds domkyrkas konsthistoria: förbindelser och stilfränder [The art history of Lund Cathedral: connections and stylistic equals]. Lund: C. W. K. Gleerup. OCLC 250557100.
