= Fin (legend) =

Fin is the subject of a legend involving the construction of a church. To get the work done, an agreement was made between a holy man and a troll or giant with dire consequences for the loser. The Danish version features a troll from Kalundborg, Zealand, Denmark. In the Swedish legend, the subject is a giant from Lund with the name Jätten Finn ('Finn the Giant').

== Danish legend ==
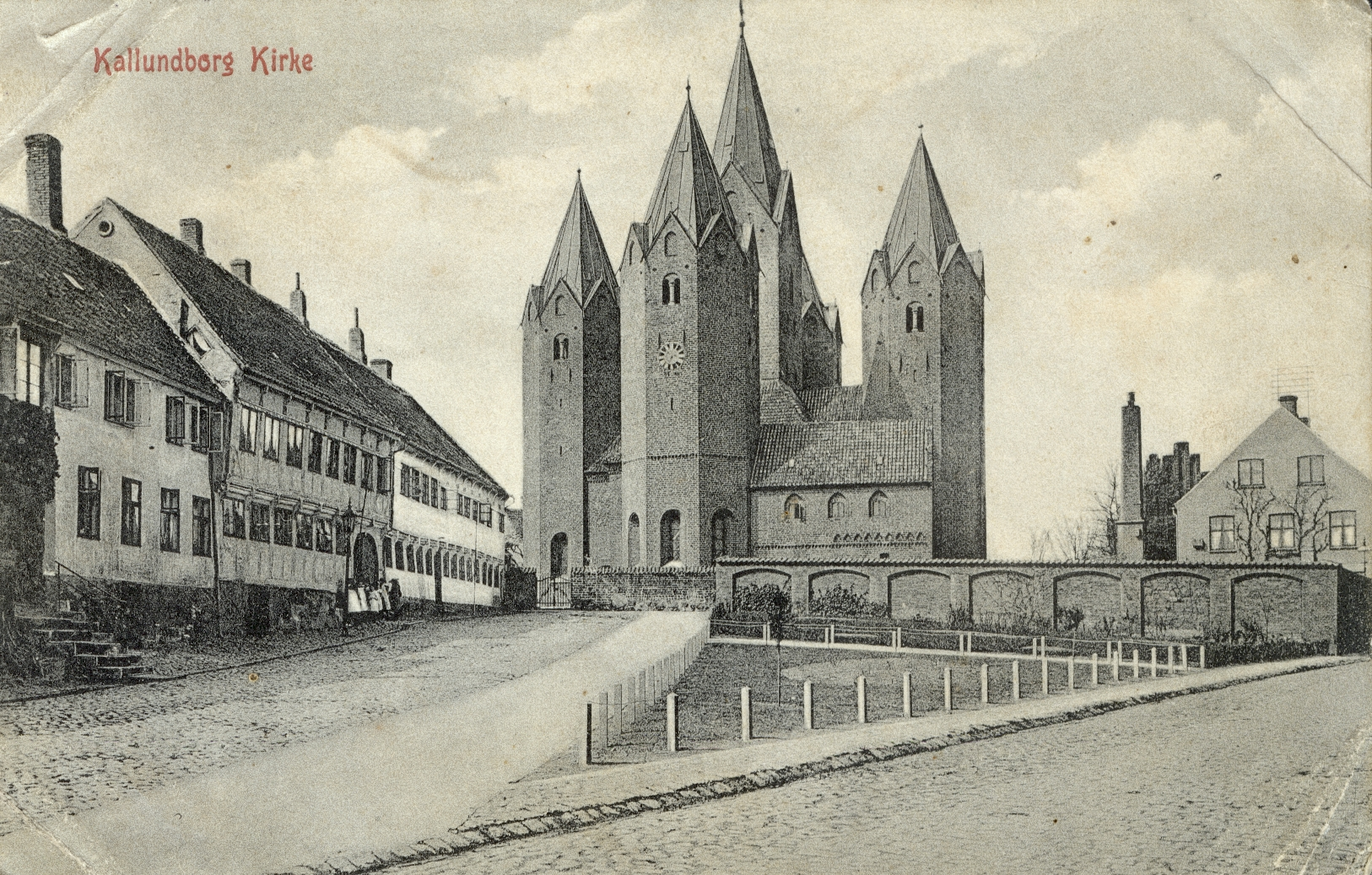
Old postcard drawing of the Church of Our Lady, Kalundborg, built near the castle of Esbern Snare (1127-1204).

The legend tells how Esbern Snare built a church in Kalundborg. It was hard work, and a troll, who was passing by, offered his services. Esbern accepted; however, the troll's condition was that Esbern should be able to figure out the troll's name by the time the church was finished; if he could not, the troll would take his heart and his eyes.

When there was only a half pillar left to erect before the church would be completed, Esbern became afraid, because he did not know the troll's name. Wandering the fields in great anxiety, he laid himself down on Ulshøj bank to rest. While there, he heard a troll-woman within the hill saying: "Lie still, baby mine! / Tomorrow cometh Fin, / Father thine, And giveth thee / Esbern Snare's / eyes and heart / to play with."

Esbern returned immediately to the church. The troll was busy setting up the half pillar that remained for the church, and when Esbern saw him, he called out "Fin". The troll was so angry that he threw the half pillar into the air. This is why the church has only three and a half pillars.

== Swedish legend ==
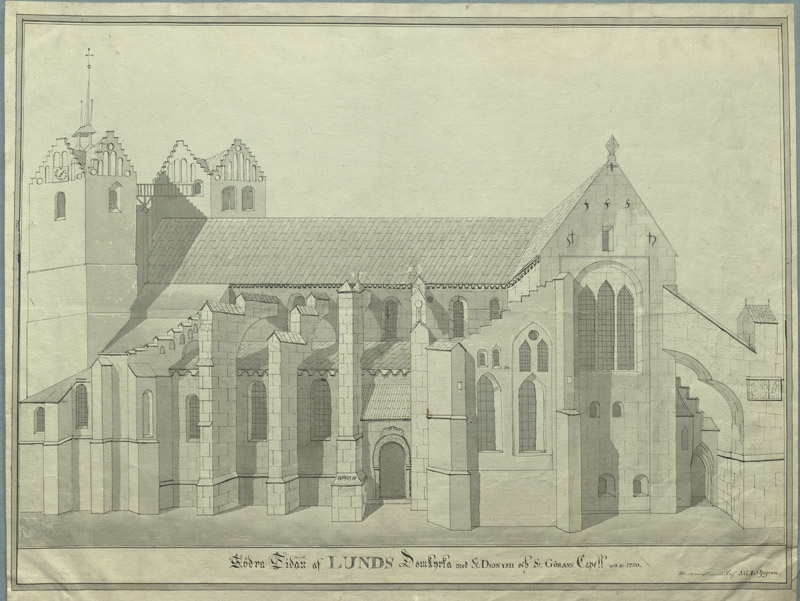
A drawing of Lund Cathedral as it appeared in 1750. Its construction began in the 11th century.

A similar legend exists in the Swedish town of Lund, where a troll or giant is supposed to have helped with the construction of Lund Cathedral. Two statues in the crypt of the cathedral are said to be the petrified remains of the legendary creature and his wife. The earliest known mention of the legend as it appears in Lund dates from 1593. The Imperial diplomat Erich Lassota von Steblau had been imprisoned in Sweden and was on his way back to continental Europe when he stopped in Lund and made a passing mention of the legend. Lassota von Steblau writes that the two statues in the crypt of the cathedral were "giants" who tried to prevent the cathedral from being built. They had been punished by God and turned into stone for this.

A more detailed account of the legend was published in 1654 by Jens Lauritzen Wolf. It appears that it's this version that has been the basis for most later versions. The legend, as recounted by Wolf, has it that Saint Lawrence was building Lund Cathedral but had a lack of both funds and building material. To speed up the construction he made a deal with the troll. The troll would help him build the cathedral, but if on the last day Saint Lawrence had not found out his name, the saint would have to bring him the sun and the moon. If he couldn't do that, the troll would be permitted to take his eyes. With the help of the troll, the construction proceeded rapidly. Saint Lawrence became more and more concerned, and to lessen his anxiety he one day took a long walk outside the city. He sat down to rest, and while resting suddenly overheard the wife of the troll comforting their child, telling him not to cry because his father Finn would bring the eyes of the saint as a toy the next day. Lawrence hurried back and found the troll just about to place the last stone in place in the cathedral. He called him out by his name, Finn. Enraged, Finn and his wife started shaking the foundation pillars in the crypt, but the force of the saint was stronger, and the whole family was petrified, frozen in motion.

An only slightly later account of the legend which is basically consistent with that of Wolf exist in a hand-written manuscript today in the archives of the Royal Swedish Academy of Letters, History and Antiquities. Another account was made in 1705.

A first critical account dates from 1750, by Johan Corylander. Corylander points out that not only is the legend clearly fictional, but that it's also improbable that the statues in the cathedral would actually be intended as an illustration of the legend. The construction of the cathedral is in fact well documented, he argued, and both the first architect and the kings who supported its construction are well known. "However superstition has been carried so far, that Saint Lawrence, who lived far more than 800 years before the construction of our cathedral and who could not even have dreamed of Scania, still has had to take the responsibility for its foundation, and an equally innocent troll for its construction", he is quoted by Otto Rydbeck.

Several later accounts of the legend exist. According to one account available in English, a holy man named Laurentius came to what is now known as Lund from Saxony to build a Christian church. As he began his work, a giant named Finn, who lived with his family in the area called Helgonabacken (or Hills of Helgona), offered to help him construct the church. His offer came with a condition, "when it is finished, you will tell me what my name is. But, mark well my condition, oh, wise man: If you cannot tell me, you must give to my little ones the two small torches -- the sun and the moon -- that travel yonder over heaven's expanse." The holy man would lose his sight if he lost the challenge.

It was known amongst the giants that they could not reveal Finn's name or the bargain would be broken, with no harm to Laurentius, and the giant must die. Driven to get the church built, the holy man accepted the offer and had faith that the name would come to him before the construction of the church was completed. Together, they quickly built the church with one remaining stone that needed to be set on the tower.

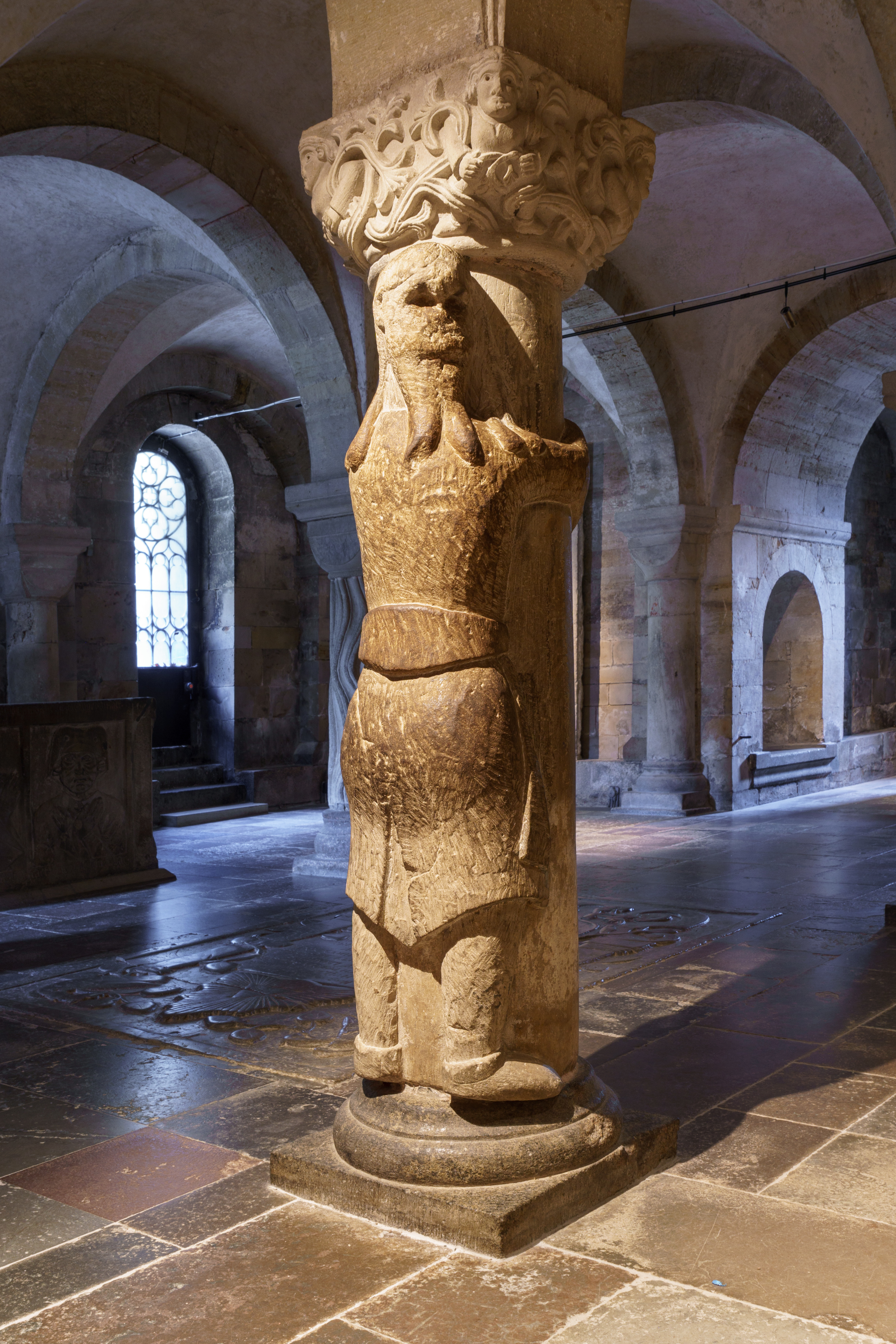
A man, thought by some to be Finn, but more likely a depiction of Samson, embracing a pillar in the crypt of the Lund Cathedral

While Laurentius worried that he did not know the giant's name and would therefore lose his sight, he heard the voice of a giant woman as she attempted to soothe her crying child, "Silent, silent, little son of mine. Morning will bring your father Finn, with either moon and sun or the priest Laurentius' eyes." The holy man ran to the church and yelled, "Come down, Finn! The stone that now remains we ourselves can set. Come down, Finn, for we no longer need your help!"

Finn became angry and wrapped his arms around a pillar in order to pull it out and destroy the cathedral. His wife and their child also tried to bring down the church, and both Finn and his wife were turned to stone, with their arms wrapped around pillars. There is a sculpture of a stone man hugging a pillar in the Lund Cathedral.

=== Statues of Finn and his wife ===
As Corylander pointed out in 1750, it's improbable that the statues in Lund Cathedral were meant to depict Finn and his wife. Rather, the legend has probably been a popular way to interpret the meaning of the statues. In fact, art historians still are not entirely sure of what subject matter the statues depict. The most commonly held theory today is that the carving represents the biblical figure Samson, who sacrificed himself by toppling the pillars of a Philistine temple.

== Similar legends ==
The legend of a bargain to help build a church is associated with other churches in Sweden, Norway, and Denmark. The story related to Eskellsätter's church of Näs in Värmland, Sweden involves a giant named Kinn falling to his death upon hearing his name by a priest named Eskil. A Norwegian legend involves the troll, Skalle, and the construction of a cathedral in Trondheim. There is also a similar legend of a troll called Wind and Weather, who was installing a cross when St. Olaf called his name.
