= Ulfstand =

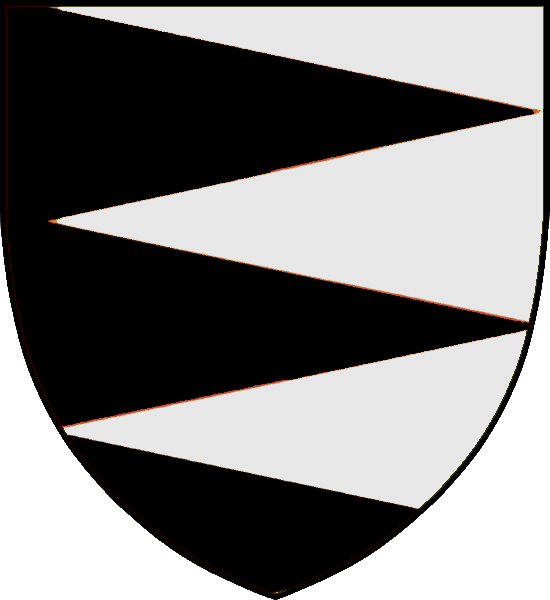
Coat of arms of Ulfstand family

The Ulfstand family was a Danish, mostly Scanian, noble family, known since the 14th century and extinct in the male line in 1637.

== History ==
It was possibly descended from a German noble family, and took the name Ulfstand when King Frederick decreed that the nobility had to take permanent family names in 1526. The family owned large estates in Scania, including Barsebäck, Glimmingehus, Skabersjö, Svenstorp and Torup, and several members were members of the Danish Council of the Realm.

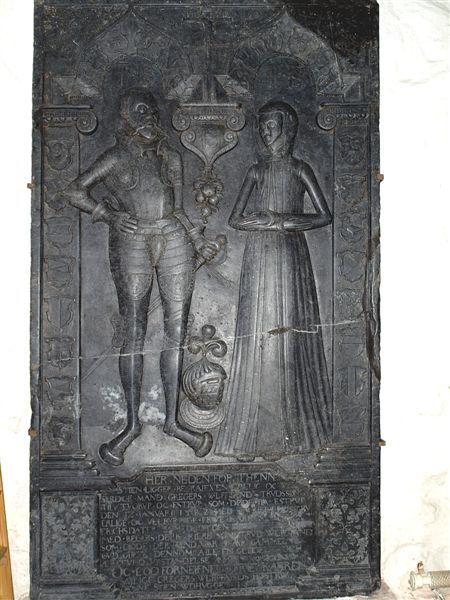
Grave memorial of Gregers Truidsen Ulfstand (d. 1582) and Karen Banner

Archbishop of Lund Jakob Gertsen (died 1410), the knight Henrik Gertsen (died after 1439), the estate owner and member of the council of the realm Truid Gregersen Ulfstand (1487–1545), his brother and member of the council of the realm Holger Gregersen Ulfstand (died 1542) of Skabersjö, and member of the council of the realm Jens Holgersen Ulfstand, are some of the members of this family. The family has many descendants through female lines in other Danish noble families.
