= 1394 =

1394 in various calendars
- Gregorian calendar: 1394; MCCCXCIV
- Ab urbe condita: 2147
- Armenian calendar: 843; ԹՎ ՊԽԳ
- Assyrian calendar: 6144
- Balinese saka calendar: 1315–1316
- Bengali calendar: 800–801
- Berber calendar: 2344
- English Regnal year: 17 Ric. 2 – 18 Ric. 2
- Buddhist calendar: 1938
- Burmese calendar: 756
- Byzantine calendar: 6902–6903
- Chinese calendar: 癸酉年 (Water Rooster); 4091 or 3884 — to — 甲戌年 (Wood Dog); 4092 or 3885
- Coptic calendar: 1110–1111
- Discordian calendar: 2560
- Ethiopian calendar: 1386–1387
- Hebrew calendar: 5154–5155
- Hindu calendars
- Vikram Samvat: 1450–1451
- Shaka Samvat: 1315–1316
- Kali Yuga: 4494–4495
- Holocene calendar: 11394
- Igbo calendar: 394–395
- Iranian calendar: 772–773
- Islamic calendar: 796–797
- Japanese calendar: Meitoku 5 / Ōei 1 (応永元年)
- Javanese calendar: 1308–1309
- Julian calendar: 1394; MCCCXCIV
- Korean calendar: 3727
- Minguo calendar: 518 before ROC 民前518年
- Nanakshahi calendar: −74
- Thai solar calendar: 1936–1937
- Tibetan calendar: ཆུ་མོ་བྱ་ལོ་ (female Water-Bird); 1520 or 1139 or 367 — to — ཤིང་ཕོ་ཁྱི་ལོ་ (male Wood-Dog); 1521 or 1140 or 368

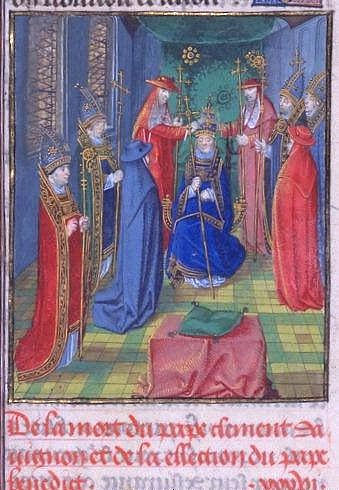
October 11 The consecration of the Antipope Benedict XIII takes place at Avignon.

The year 1394 (MCCCXCIV) was a common year starting on Thursday (link will display full calendar) of the Julian calendar.

== Events ==
=== January–March ===
- January 8 – Ashikaga Yoshimitsu retires as shōgun of Japan, and is succeeded by his son, Ashikaga Yoshimochi.
- January 10 – Antonio Venier, Doge of the Republic of Venice, appoints Desiderato Lucio as the Grand Chancellor. Lucio serves until April 23, 1396.
- January 11 – The King of Naples, Ladislao of Anjou-Durazzo, grants Neapolitan-controlled Greece to Nerio Acciaioli as the Duchy of Athens.
- January 15 – Grand Prince Chinan of the Joseon kingdom in Korea, eldest son of King Taejo and heir to the throne, dies at the age of 39 from complications of alcoholism.
- January 20 – In India, Ala ud-din Sikandar Shah becomes the new Sultan of Delhi upon the death of his father, Muhammad Shah III.
- January 28 – The English Parliament, summoned by King Richard II of England, opens its session after having been summoned on November 13, 1393, and elects Sir John Bussy as speaker of the Commons.
- February 1 – Sikandar Shah is crowned Sultan in a ceremony at Delhi.
- February 28 – Richard II of England grants Geoffrey Chaucer 20 pounds a year for life, for his services as a diplomat and Clerk of The King's Works.
- March 6 – The English Parliament closes after a 37 day session. Among the acts receiving royal assent are the Money Act (prohibiting the melting of money and the import of foreign money), the Cloths Act ("Every person may make cloth of what length and breadth he will."), and the Exportation of Corn Act (allowing all of the King's subjects to ship grain from the Kingdom.)
- March 8 – Mahmud Shah II becomes the new Sultan of Delhi when his brother, Sikandar, dies after less than seven weeks as monarch. At the same time, another claimant to the throne, Nasir-ud-din Nusrat Shah Tughluq, proclaims his rule at the royal palace in Firozabad leading to civil war breaking out in the Delhi Sultanate, splitting the state between east and west.
- March – Stephen I (Ştefan) succeeds Roman I as Prince of Moldavia (modern-day Moldova and eastern Romania).

=== April–June ===
- April 26 – Martín Yáñez de la Barbudo of the Kingdom of Castile, master of the Order of Alcántara military group and leader of a crusade against the Muslim Emirate of Granada, leads an army across the border into the Emirate and marches toward the capital. Granadan Emir Muhammad VII sends emissaries to King Enrique III of Castile to complain about the violation of the truce between them, and then mobilizes the Granadan Army to repel the invasion by Barbuda, who is killed in the battle along with hundreds of other Castilians.
- May 17 – By order of King Taejo of the Joseon dyanasty of Korea, who had taken power in 1392 by overthrowing the Goryeo dynasty, the former monarch, King Gongyang, is executed by strangulation at the prison in Samcheok, along with Crown Prince Jeongseong and the remaining survivors of the Goryeo royal family.
- June 3 – Abu Faris Abd al-Aziz II becomes the new of Caliph of the Hafsid dynasty at Tunis in Ifriqiya, North Africa (part of modern-day Algeria, Tunisia and Libya) on the death of his father Abu al-Abbas Ahmad II.
- June 11 – The Venetians take over possession of Argos in the Peloponnese from Despot Theodore I Palaiologos.

=== July–September ===
- July 9 – Philip the Bold, Duke of Burgundy, and the mentally unstable, King Charles VI of France, agree that Philip's first granddaughter would marry King Charles's son and heir apparent, the two-year-old Dauphin Charles de France. The agreement will not achieve a result, in that the Dauphin and will die at age nine in 1401.
- July 16 – The agreement between the Swiss Confederacy (the cantons of Lucerne, Uri, Schwyz and Unterwaldeden) and the Duchy of Austria, originally signed on April 1, 1389, following the 1386 Battle of Sempach, is extended by amendment.
- July 24 – General Paolo Savelli of the Republic of Venice and Giovanni Colonna, Lord of Palestrina, attempt a coup d'etat to overthrow the government of Rome and the rule of Pope Urban VI by attacking Capitoline Hill, but fail to get support.
- August 2 (5th day of the 7th month of Meitoku 5) – The Meitoku era in Japan is declared to be at an end because of the misfortune of a smallpox epidemic, and the Ōei era begins.
- August 15 – Two months after being captured by King Sigismund (Zsigmond) of Hungary, the Serbian rebel John Horvat (Horváti János) is brutally executed at Pécs by dismemberment to avenge the 1387 execution of the former Queen consort of Hungary, Elizabeth of Bosnia.
- September 17 – King Charles VI of France orders the expulsion of all Jews from France.
- September 28 – Cardinal Pedro Martínez de Luna of the Kingdom of Aragon, opposed to the rule of the Roman Pope Urban VI, is elected at Avignon as Antipope Benedict XIII to succeed Antipope Clement VII.

=== October–December ===
- October 2 – King Richard II of England leads an expedition to Ireland to enforce his rule there. However, in the Battle of Ros-Mhic-Thriúin, the Kingdom of Leinster, led by King Art Óg Mac Murchadha Caomhánach, defeats the English army led by King Richard and Roger Mortimer, 4th Earl of March.
- October 10 – At the Battle of Karanovasa, Wallachia (modern southern Romania) repels an invasion by the army of the Ottoman Empire and its Serb and Bulgarian vassals.
- October 11 – Antipope Benedict XIII begins his reign in Avignon.
- November 29 – The capital city of the Joseon dynasty (in modern-day Korea) is moved from Gaegyeong (modern Gaeseong) to Hanseong (modern Seoul). The Gyeongbokgung Palace and Jongmyo royal ancestral shrine are built here.
- December 6 – The astronomical clock of St. Nicholas Church in Stralsund is finished and signed by Nikolaus Lilienfeld.
- December 11 – John/Eleanor Rykener, a transvestite male prostitute (and embroiderer) working mainly in London, but also active in Oxford and elsewhere (and consorting with some who have taken religious vows), is interrogated by the Mayor of London following his arrest near Cheapside, leaving a rare surviving legal record from this period which mentions same-sex intercourse.

=== Date unknown ===
- The Stiftsbrauerei Kempten, oldest constituent of the Allgäuer Brewery, is established in modern-day Germany.
- The Hongwu Emperor of the Ming dynasty in China orders the Ministry of Public Works to issue a public notice, that every 100 households in the lijia system are to set aside 2 mu (1,390 m^{2}) of land, for planting mulberry and jujube trees.

== Births ==
- March 4 – Prince Henry the Navigator, Portuguese patron of exploration (d. 1460)
- June 4 – Philippa of England, Queen of Denmark, Norway and Sweden (d. 1430)
- July 12 – Ashikaga Yoshinori, Japanese shōgun (d. 1441)
- July 25 – James I of Scotland (d. 1437)
- November 24 – Charles I, Duke of Orléans, French poet (d. 1465)
- date unknown
  - Ulugh Beg, Timurid ruler and astronomer (d. 1449)
  - Ikkyū, Japanese Zen Buddhist priest and poet (d. 1481)
  - Michael de la Pole, 3rd Earl of Suffolk (d. 1415)
- probable – Cymburgis of Masovia, Duchess of Austria

== Deaths ==
- June 25 – Dorothea of Montau, German hermitess (b. 1347)
- March 17 – Louis, Count of Enghien, Count of Conversano and Brienne
- March 24 – Constance of Castile, claimant to the throne of Castile
- June 4 – Mary de Bohun, English countess, married to Henry IV of England
- June 7 – Anne of Bohemia, queen of Richard II of England (plague) (b. 1366)
- August 27 – Emperor Chōkei of Japan (b. 1343)
- September 16 – Antipope Clement VII (b. 1342)
- December 28 – Maria Angelina Doukaina Palaiologina, basilissa of Epirus (b. 1350)
- date unknown
  - John Hawkwood, English mercenary (b. 1320)
  - Fazlallah Astarabadi, Persian founder of the mystical Hurufism sect (executed)
  - Sultan Mahmud II of the Delhi Sultanate
  - Former King Gongyang of Goryeo (b. 1345)
