= Lund astronomical clock =

15th-century astronomical clock in Lund Cathedral

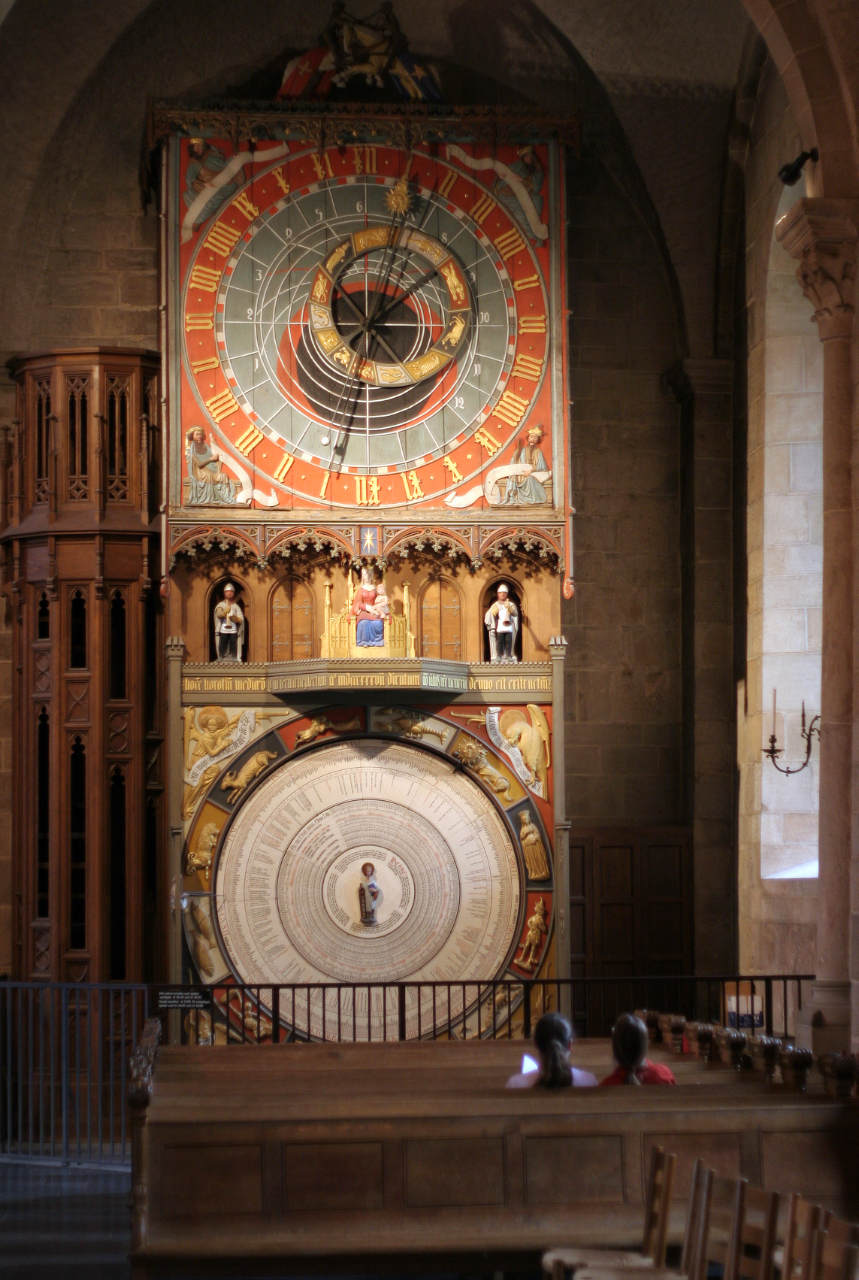
Lund Cathedral Astronomical Clock

Lund astronomical clock, occasionally and at least since the 16th century referred to as Horologium mirabile Lundense (Latin: "the wonderful clock in Lund"), is a 15th-century astronomical clock in Lund Cathedral. Mentioned in written sources for the first time in 1442, it was probably made and installed sometime around 1423–1425, possibly by Nikolaus Lilienfeld. It is part of a group of related medieval astronomical clocks found in the area around the south Baltic Sea. In 1837 the clock was dismantled. Between 1909 and 1923, it was restored by the Danish clockmaker Julius Bertram-Larsen and the Swedish architect responsible for the upkeep of the cathedral, Theodor Wåhlin. From the old clock, the face of the clock as well as the mechanism, which was largely replaced during the 18th century, was salvaged and re-used. The casing, most parts of the calendar which occupies the lower part, and the middle section were made anew.

The clock displays a medieval concept of time, based on a geocentric idea of the universe, and is decorated with religious symbols. It is possible to determine the current time of the day, the current lunar phase, the current position of the sun in the zodiac as well as the current date of the year and related information, from the clock. The current perpetual calendar spans from 1923 to 2123.

Two times every day, the mechanism of the clock triggers a parade of statues representing the Three Kings across the face of the astronomical clock, while a built-in organ plays the medieval tune In dulci jubilo.

== History ==
=== Origins ===
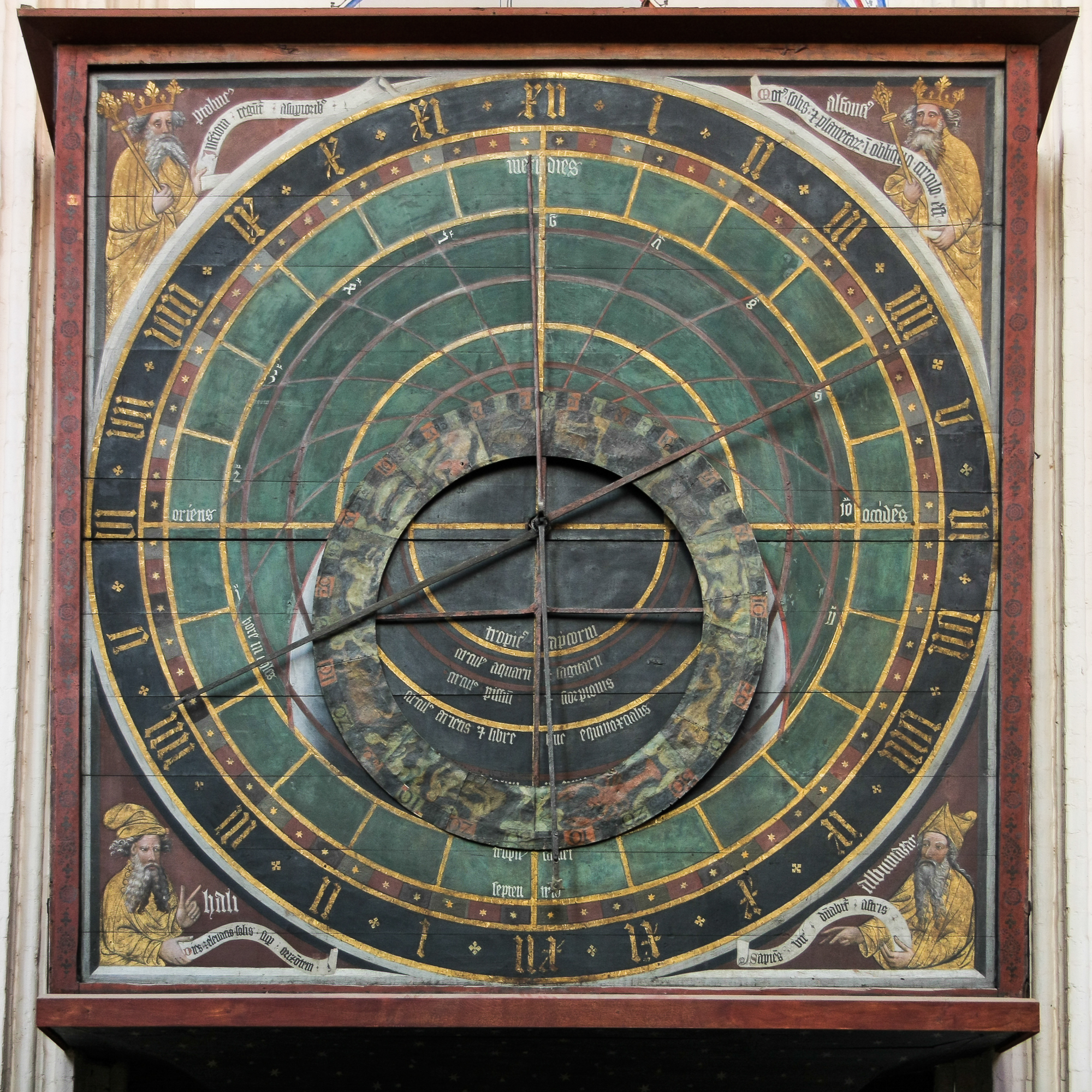
The astronomical clock in St. Nicholas Church, Stralsund, made by clockmaker Nikolaus Lilienfeld. The clock in Lund is very similar and may also be by Lilienfeld.

Tree-ring dating of the wood used for the calendar face of the clock in 1996 led to the conclusion that the wood used for the clock was oak wood cut sometime between 1417 and 1428. Researchers have also been able to determine that the wood came from oak trees that had grown in Pomerania in present-day Poland. The clock is mentioned in written sources for the first time in 1442. The time between 1375 and 1475 saw the construction of astronomical clocks in churches in several cities in the area around the western Baltic Sea. Apart from Lund, very similar astronomical clocks have existed, and in a few cases still exist, in Doberan, Gdańsk, Lübeck, Münster, Rostock, Stendal, Stralsund and Wismar. This constitutes a group of astronomical clocks unique in both numbers and quality, although only the Stralsund clock and the Rostock clock have been preserved more or less intact. Of the clocks in this group, the ones in Doberan and Stralsund are the most similar to Lund's clock, and it is possible that the clockmaker Nikolaus Lilienfeld who made the clock in Stralsund also made the clock in Lund. A detail not found in any other of these clocks is two wooden knights who also function as jacquemarts, striking their swords against each other to mark the full hour. The jacquemarts on the astronomical clock in Wells Cathedral in England is the only other known example of such a decoration. It has therefore been speculated that the jacquemarts in Lund are a reflection of English influences conveyed via the Queen of Denmark, Philippa of England, who is known to have been personally engaged in the upkeep of the cathedral.

It is possible that the clock was manufactured in order to be installed in time for the 300th anniversary celebration of the consecration of the cathedral's main altar in 1423. A new, minor church bell was hung in the south tower in 1425, and as the clock would originally have been connected with a bell it is possible that the clock was installed in connection with this. The clock has also been assumed to be from the first decades of the 15th century on stylistic grounds. It was previously thought, due to a more superficial stylistic comparison Wåhlin made with the choir stalls of Lund Cathedral, to have been from the 1380s.

Several written records mention the clock in the following centuries: it is, for example, compared with the Strasbourg astronomical clock in the Encyclopédie in 1779. It appears to have been non-functional already by the 17th century, however. In 1836 it is described by Carl Georg Brunius as being in a bad condition, and in 1837 it was removed from the cathedral.

=== Restoration ===
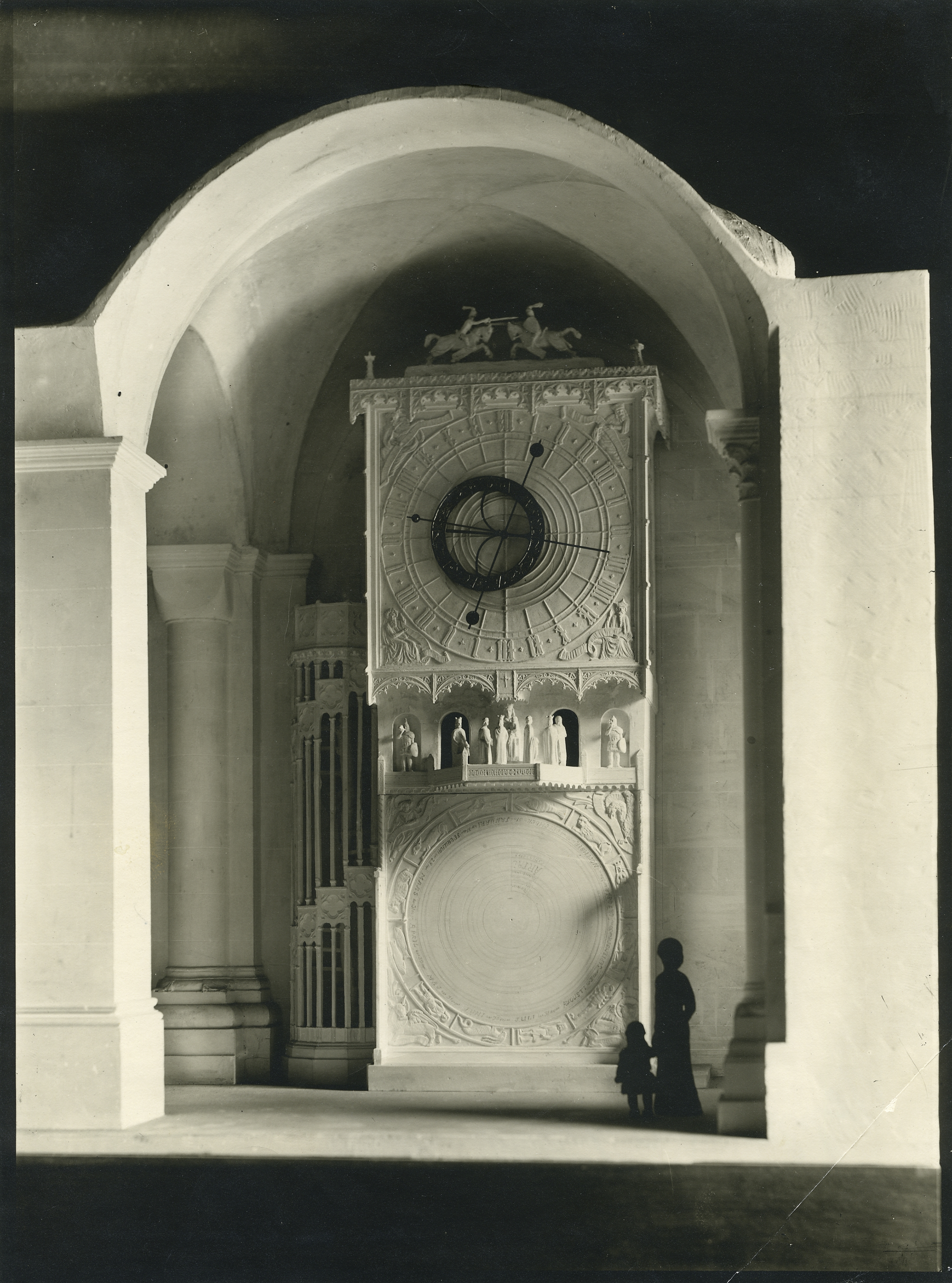
An early concept model for the restoration of the clock

The Danish clockmaker Julius Bertram-Larsen (1854–1935) had visited Lund Cathedral, first as a youth and later as a grown man in 1907, and saw some of the remains of the astronomical clock. He became interested in creating a replacement. Originally he imagined this as a completely new clock in Art Nouveau style. In 1909 he came in contact with the architect responsible for the upkeep of the cathedral, Theodor Wåhlin, who had found further pieces of the clock. The two decided to try to restore the clock, and would keep cooperating on the project for the next 14 years.

The mechanism consisted of parts mostly made during a restoration of the clock in 1706, but parts of it may also have been medieval. From the exterior of the clock, the face of the clock remained, as well as the frame of the calendar which Wåhlin found in one of the cathedral attics. Bertram-Larsen repaired and added missing pieces to the mechanism, while Wåhlin supplied designs for the exterior of the restored clock. Anders Olson supplied the new sculptures to complement the medieval parts, guided by a description of the clock made in the 16th century. In order to raise funds for the project, Wåhlin held a lecture about the clock and its history in Stockholm in 1915, and invited the Crown Prince, the future King Gustaf VI Adolf of Sweden, as well as the heads of several cultural institutions. For the occasion, Wåhlin had also commissioned the Danish sculptor Niels Hansen to make an 80 centimetres (31 in) tall model of the proposed restored clock, which was demonstrated at the lecture. He thereby managed to secure royal patronage for the project, and the restored clock was inaugurated in 1923 by King Gustaf V of Sweden. At the inauguration ceremony, Bertram-Larsen was awarded the Order of Vasa by the Swedish king for his work. In the end, the restored clock consisted of the medieval clockface and the repaired mechanism, while the calendar is a reconstruction. The remaining medieval pieces of the clock were instead stored in the cathedral museum, part of Historical Museum at Lund University.

The clock was cleaned and renovated again between 2009 and 2010. After its last renovation it was restarted by the Bishop of Lund, later Archbishop of Uppsala, Antje Jackelén.

== Description ==
The astronomical clock consists of an upper board or face, showing the time, and a lower board which is a calendar. In addition to these two main functions, twice every day the clock mechanism triggers a mechanical parade of the Three Kings with their servants paying tribute to Saint Mary across the middle of the clock, while a built-in organ plays In dulci jubilo, a medieval tune. The entire wooden structure is 7.65 metres (25.1 ft) tall and protrudes from the wall behind it. To the left, a spiral staircase connects the upper with the lower part of the structure, as well as with the entrance to the rooms behind, where the elaborate mechanism is located.

=== Function of the clock ===
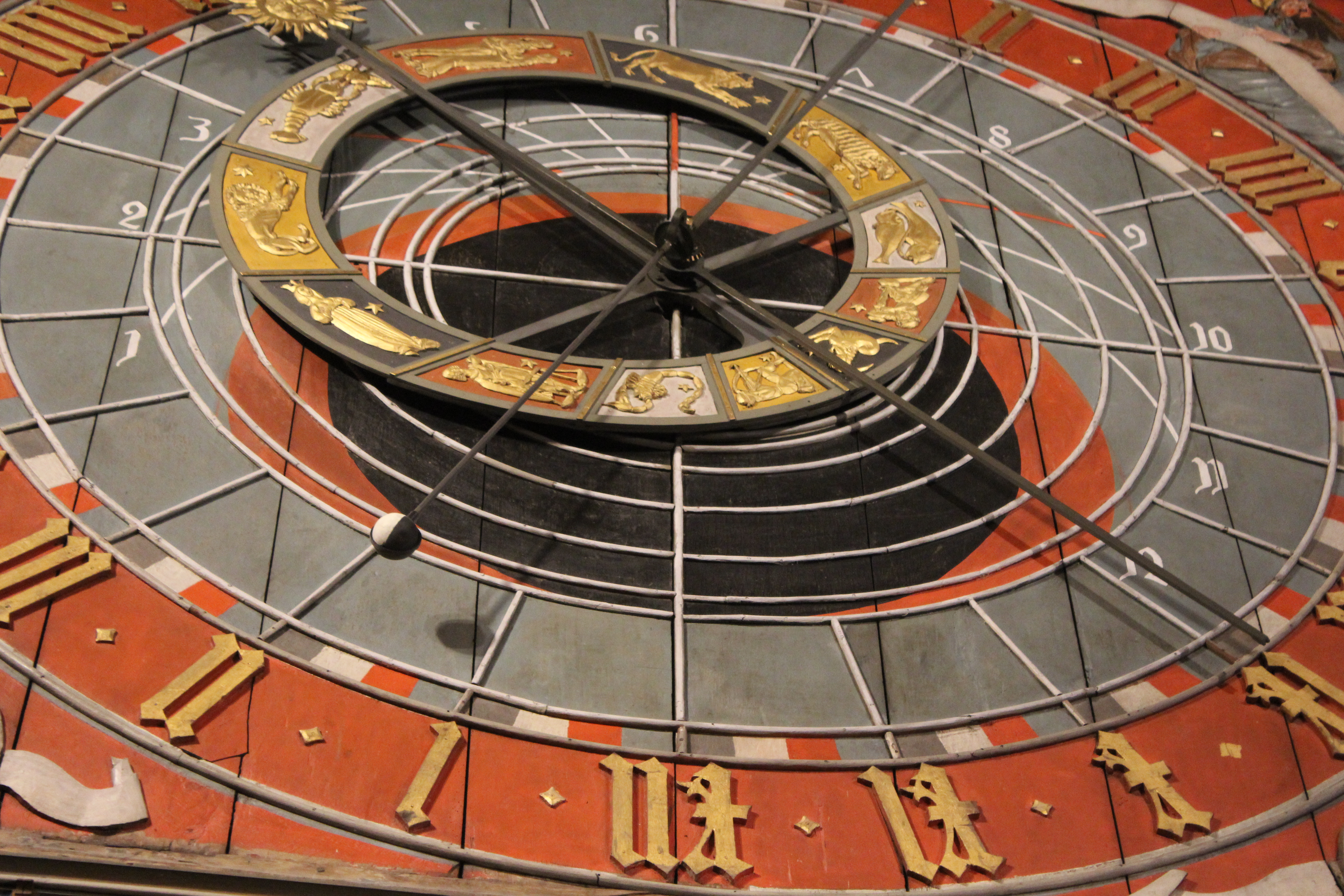
A close-up view of the clockface and the different hands

The astronomical clock displays a medieval concept of time, based on a geocentric idea of the Universe. The clock, the upper part, shows a number of things. Its centre can be said to represent Earth in the geocentric model, around which the Sun, the Moon and the stars were thought to orbit. One of the hands, decorated with a depiction of the Sun, tells the hour of the day; the clockface is divided into 24 sections marked with Roman numerals from one to twelve, twice. The right side of the clock displays the hours from noon until midnight and the left side displays the hours from midnight to noon. The sections between the numerals are further divided into four segments, making it possible to determine the time to the nearest quarter of an hour. There is also a dial which is decorated with a round ball at one end, symbolising the Moon and displaying its course across the sky. In addition, the ball itself is half white and half black and rotates around its own axis. From this information the lunar phases can be deduced: when the ball is all black, it is a new moon whereas an all white ball denotes a full moon. A metal circle divided into twelve decorated sections also rotates asymmetrically over the surface of the clock. It represents the ecliptic. Where the hands representing the Sun and the Moon cut across the outer rim of this circle, is where the Sun and Moon are currently visible within the ecliptic.

The twelve symbols decorating the circle are the twelve signs of the zodiac; it is thus possible to determine which of the twelve constellations the Sun or Moon lies in front of at any given moment. The red and black fields at the bottom of the clock phase represent the horizon, as observable from Lund Cathedral. If the point where the hand representing the Sun cuts the outer rim of the circle depicting the ecliptic, and that point is over the black field, it means the Sun is below the horizon and it is night. If the same point is above the red field, it is twilight. The hand with the Moon works in a similar way: when the point where the hand crosses the ecliptic is in over the black field, the Moon is below the horizon. These correlations are measured precisely for the location of Lund Cathedral; if the clock would be moved to the north or south, the black and red fields would not be usable. Wåhlin was surprised and delighted when he realised this intricacy, and wrote "It is wonderful to see how at Midwinter the Sun, soon after it has set, goes into the black field, while when the hands are in the Midsummer mode it stays all night over the red field." It is also possible to determine approximately when there is a solstice, as well as the sunshine duration each day, again with the help of the ecliptic and using the white lines painted on the face of the clock.

=== Function of the calendar ===
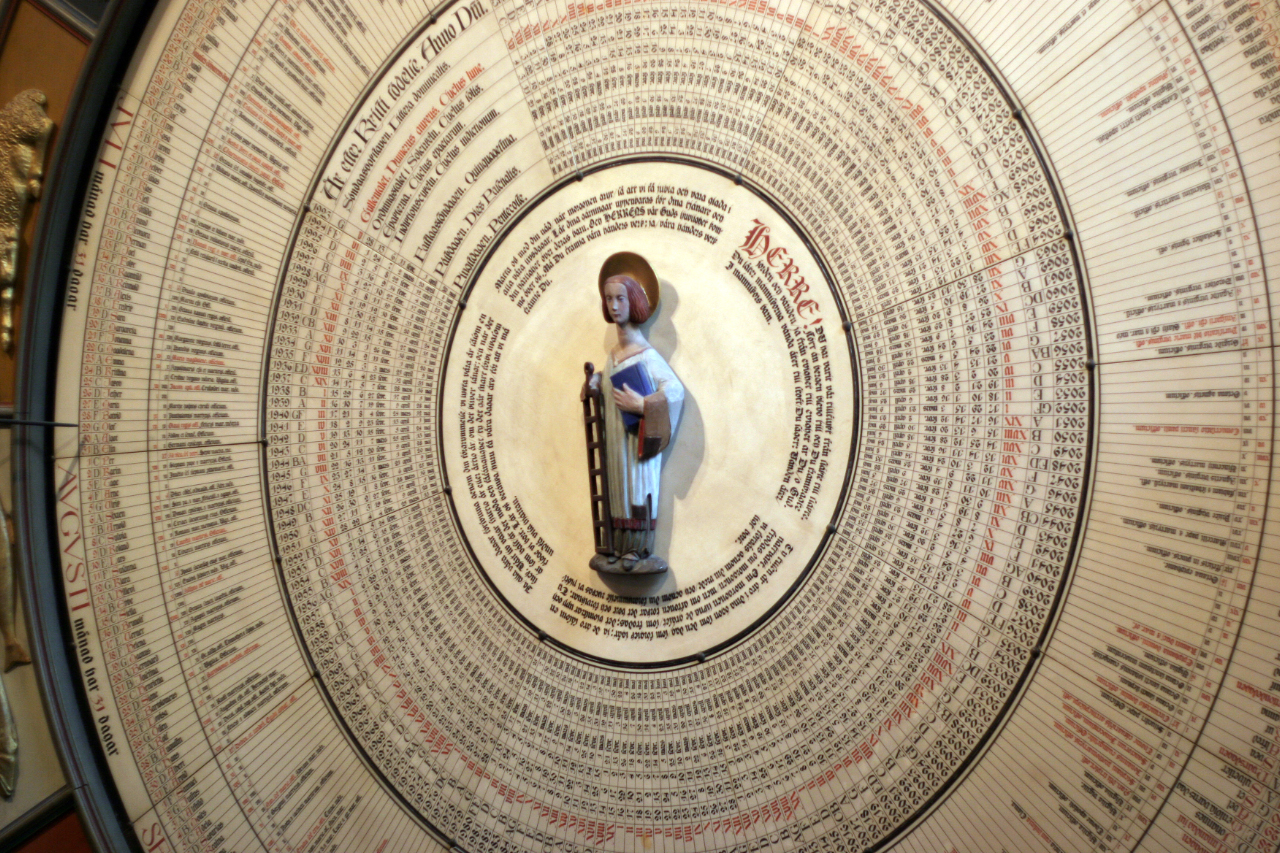
Face of the calendar

The second large square plane of the astronomical clock, at the bottom, is a perpetual calendar that spans from 1923 to 2123. It is divided into two main sections, an outer ring which is moveable, and an inner ring which is static. The outer ring moves one notch, or 1/366 of a full turn, every day at midnight, and the current day of the year is indicated to the left on the face. It also contains a letter from A to G, with the help of which it is possible to determine the day of the week by using the table on the inner, static ring. The outer ring also contains information about the current name day according to the calendar of 1923, but also local medieval name days, which Wåhlin extracted from several medieval sources tied to Lund Cathedral, such as the illuminated manuscript Necrologium Lundense. The date according to the Roman calendar is also decipherable from the information on the outer ring of the calendar.

The inner ring contains the data needed to compute which day of the week the current date is, but also information which makes it possible to determine on which date Quinquagesima, Easter Day (computus) and Whitsun is for any given year within the time span of the calendar. It is also possible to determine the phase of the Moon for any given date.

=== Mechanism ===
The mechanism of the astronomical clock occupies a large space within the tower behind the visible clock. It is almost 8 metres (26 ft) tall and stretches through three storeys of the tower. In addition, lines connecting the mechanism with one of the tower clocks and the pendulums run from the top of the tower to its basement. The complex mechanism still probably contains some medieval parts, but has been repaired and modernised several times. Much of it dates from 1706, and was based on a system using an anchor escapement, but when it was installed again in the early 20th century, the mechanism used a lever escapement system. The mechanism also connects a small organ in the basement with the astronomical clock. It is this organ that plays In dulci jubilo every time the show with the animated figures is activated. Bertram-Larsen restored the mechanism cautiously, leaving new parts unpainted so that they could easily be distinguished from the original mechanism. The mechanism was placed without a casing, making it easily accessible for cleaning and repairs.

== Decoration ==
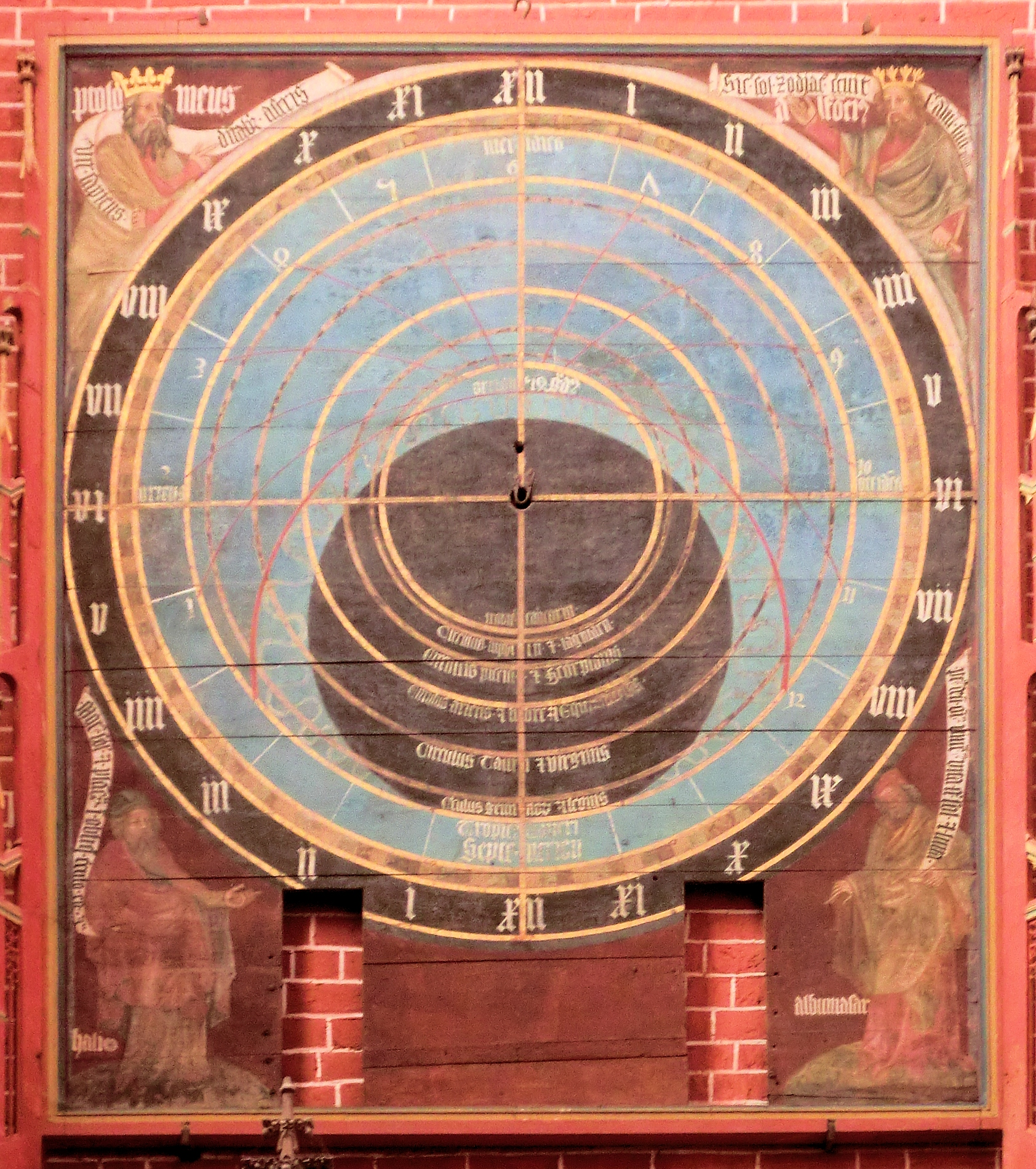
The face of the astronomical clock in Doberan Minster is very similar to the one in Lund. In Doberan, the stargazers in the corners are marked with their names.

The iconography of the clock reflects the medieval cosmology in which it was conceived. Like other medieval astronomical clocks, its decoration reflected a profoundly religious, Christian idea of the universe in which God and the saints were superior to not only Earth and humanity, but also to time itself and the cosmos as a whole. The upper part, the clock, represents celestial time, while the calendar has the human experience of time at its centre.

The very top of the astronomical clock is crowned by the jacquemart knights. They are replicas made by Anders Olson when the clock was restored in the early 20th century. The knight on the right, clad in blue with a silver star, symbolises darkness and night, and the one on the left symbolises daylight.

Both the clock and the calendar faces are square, with inscribed circles. The space in the corners between the circles and the frame are decorated by carved wooden sculptures. In the four corners of the face of the clock are depictions of four stargazers holding empty speech scrolls. Such figures also exist in the similar astronomical clocks in Stralsund and Doberan, where they hold banners with their names: Ptolemy, Alfonso X of Castile, Abu Ma'shar al-Balkhi and Hali, clockwise from top left. It is therefore now assumed that the figures in Lund depict the same men. Hali may signify either Haly Abenragel or be a Latinisation of either Abu Ali al-Khayyat, Ali ibn Ridwan or some other Arab astronomer with a similar name. Wåhlin thought that the sculpture now considered to be Abu Ma'shar was a representation of a Mongol or Chinese astronomer, either the Duke of Zhou, Ulugh Beg or Nasir al-Din al-Tusi, who was employed by Hulagu Khan.

The middle section is a plane with a statue of Saint Mary holding the infant Christ in her arms placed in the middle. To the right and left of her are two automata in the form of heralds with trumpets. Twice every day the heralds raise their trumpets and the small organ of the clock begins to play In dulci jubilo. At the same time, small gates to the left and right of Mary and Jesus open, and statuettes of the Three Kings with their servants parade across the face of the clock, from left to right. The kings bow to the statue of Mary and Christ. This "devotional procession" is a reconstruction—the sculptures were made by Anders Olson and the face of one of the kings is probably a self-portrait of him—but based on earlier descriptions and a drawing of the original, medieval clock. It can be interpreted as a symbol of people from all the three continents known to medieval Europeans paying homage to God, the Lord of Earth and Heaven alike.

Below is the large square of the calendar, which in its entirety is a reconstruction of how the medieval calendar may have looked. It is also decorated with religious and other symbols. To the left is a statuette depicting Chronos in the form of an old man; he points a long stick which indicates the current day of the year. The centre of the calendar is decorated with a statuette of Saint Lawrence, the patron saint of Lund Cathedral during the Middle Ages. Both sculptures were made by Anders Olson. The text around Saint Lawrence is a Swedish translation of four verses from Psalm 90. The corners of the calendar board are decorated with the symbols of the Four Evangelists; these are original from the 15th century.

== See also ==
- History of timekeeping devices

== Works cited ==
- Brunius, Carl Georg (1836). Nordens äldsta metropolitankyrka, eller, historisk och arkitektonisk beskrifning öfver Lunds domkyrka [The oldest metropolitan church in the Nordic countries, or, historic and architectonic description of Lund Cathedral] (in Swedish). Lund: Berling.
- Etheridge, Christian (2015). "The Evidence for Islamic Scientific Works in Medieval Iceland". In Heß, Cordelia; Adams, Jonathan (eds.). Fear and Loathing in the North. De Gruyter. doi:10.1515/9783110346473-007. ISBN 978-3-11-034646-6. S2CID 164260896.
- Ljunghoff, Johannes (1948). Det underbara uret i Lund och dess kristna symbolik [The wonderful clock in Lund and its Christian symbolism]. Lund.
- Mogensen, Lone, ed. (2008). Det underbara uret i Lund [The wonderful clock in Lund] (in Swedish). Lund: Historiska Media. ISBN 978-91-85507-93-1.
- Rydbeck, Otto (1946). "Lunds domkyrka, byggnadens och dess inventariers historia enligt de nyaste forskningsresultaten" [Lund Cathedral, the history of the building and its furnishings according to the latest research]. In Newman, Ernst (ed.). Lunds domkyrkas historia 1145–1945 [History of Lund Cathedral 1145–1945] (in Swedish). Stockholm: Svenska kyrkans diakonistyrelses bokförlag.
- Schukowski, Manfred (2002). "Historische Kunst- und Monumentaluhren" [Historical artistic and monumental clocks] (PDF). Astronomie und Raumfahrt (in German). 1 (39): 15–17.
- Wåhlin, Theodor (1918). Det medeltida uret, dess uppkomst och utveckling [The medieval clock. Its origins and development] (in Swedish). Göteborg: Tekniska samfundet.
- Wåhlin, Theodor (1923). Lunds domkyrkas medeltida ur: kortfattad beskrivning och vägledning för det medeltida urets avläsande [The medieval clock in Lund Cathedral: a short description and guide to its interpretation] (in Swedish). Lund: Håkan Ohlssons boktr.
