= Nikolaus Lilienfeld =

German clock maker

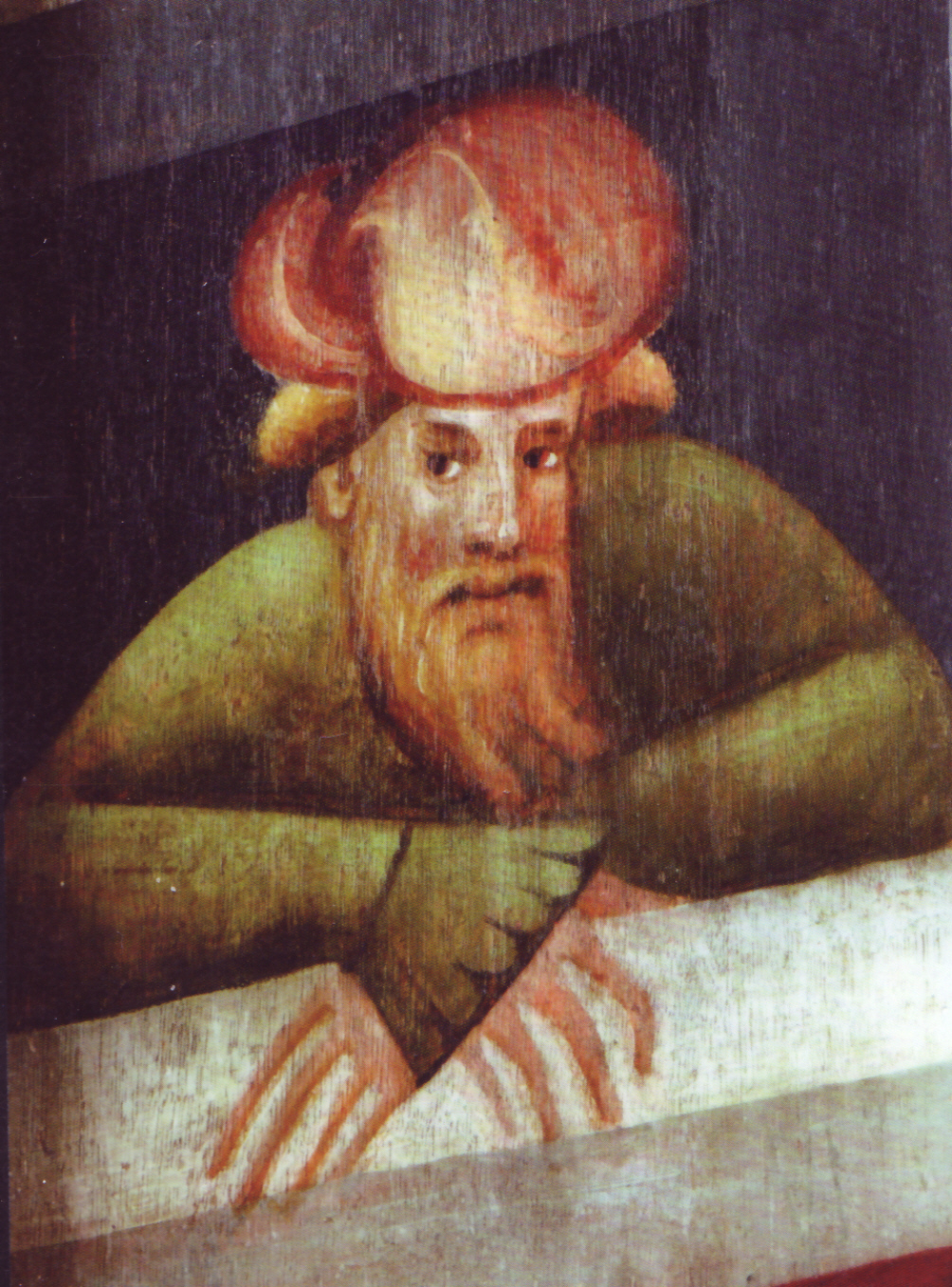
Nikolaus Lilienfeld

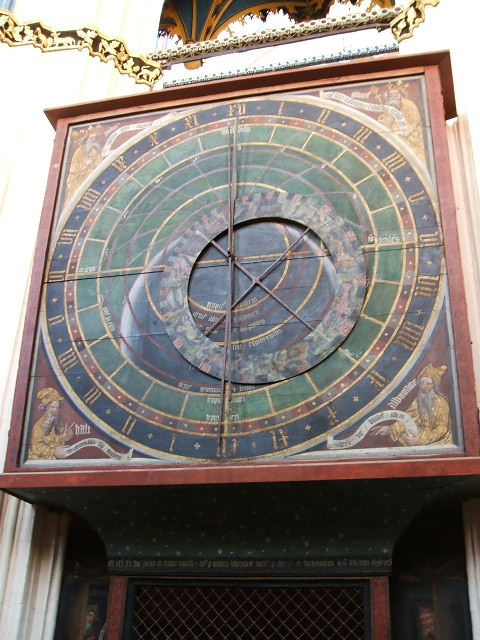
Astronomical clock in the St. Nicholas Church, Stralsund

Nikolaus Lilienfeld (also spelled Nicolaus Lillienveld or Nikolaus Lillienfeld) was a German engineer and clockmaker of the late 14th and early 15th centuries.

== Life and work ==
The circumstances of Lilienfeld's life are largely unknown. It is assumed that he was born between 1350 and 1365 and died between 1420 and 1435. The place of Lilienfeld's birth or death is unknown.

Lilienfeld is first attested in late 1394, when he completed the astronomical clock in Stralsund. In 1396, he was named in two Rostock records as a witness to the notarisation in connection with the founding of the Marienehe Charterhouse in Rostock; in 1406, he worked as a hydraulic engineer for the Marienkron Monastery near Rügenwalde and in 1420, he received a financial grant for the construction of a water pipe for the city of Stralsund.

Lilienfeld's importance results from the fact that he built the astronomical clock in St. Nicholas Church, Stralsund. This makes him the oldest clockmaker known by name in the Baltic region. The clock he constructed bears the Latin inscription:

Anno mcccxciiii In die sancte nicolai completum est opus per nicolaum lillienueld orate pro factoribus et largitoribus qui cum diligencia compleuerunt. (In 1394, on the day of St. Nicholas, this work was completed by Nicolaus Lillienveld. Pray for the makers and donors who created it with caring diligence).

Lilienfeld probably had no academic education, but was skilled in the use of astronomical instruments. His indication of the latitude of Stralsund on the dial of the Stralsund clock with 54 degrees 25 minutes is of astonishing accuracy.

The clock case also bears a portrait of Lilienfeld on the southern side wall, the oldest portrait of a clockmaker ever.

Due to similarities of preserved parts with the corresponding elements of the Stralsund clock, it is assumed that Lilienfeld also built the astronomical clock of Doberan Minster, of which only the dial remains today, as well as the clock in Lund Cathedral, which is no longer in its original state. However, there is no written evidence for this assumption.
