= Battle of Puerto Lope =

Disaster of Puerto Lope
- Part of the Spanish Reconquista
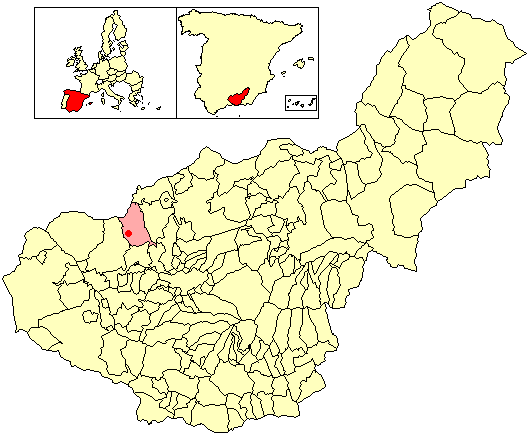
- The location of Puerto Lope
Date	26 April 1394
Location	Puerto Lope, Emirate of Granada 37°20′10″N 3°49′56″W
Result	Granadan victory

Belligerents
Crown of Castile; Order of Calatrava	Emirate of Granada

Commanders and leaders
Martín Yáñez de Barbudo †	Muhammad VII of Granada

Strength
6,300 men	5,000 knights 120,000 infantry (exaggeration)

Casualties and losses
3,600 killed 1,200 captured 1,500 escaped	500 killed

The Battle of Puerto Lope or Disaster of Puerto Lope was a military engagement between the Granadan forces and the Castilian Crusaders who invaded Granada. The battle ended in victory for the Granadans and the destruction of the Crusader forces.

== Background ==
During the reign of Muhammad V of Granada, he made peace with Castile. His successors, Yusuf II and Muhammad VII, preserved the peace. However, in 1394, the grandmaster of Order of Calatrava, Martín Yáñez de Barbudo, was induced by a hermit called Juan del Sayo that if he fought with Muhammad VII, he would win without any man dying. Martín prepared to attack Granada if the Sultan refused to acknowledge the Christian faith and denounce Islam. He dispatched two messengers to the Sultan; however, they were arrested and mistreated.

Seeing this, Martín gathered a force of 300 knights and 1,000 infantry. The Castilian king, Henry III, attempted to dissuade Martín from going into expedition, seeing this would break the peace and that his force would be crushed. Martín refused. Martín set out to Cordoba, where he was dissuaded by the nobles of Cordoba, reminding him of the defeats suffered in 1280, 1319, and 1362; he would also be crushed by a large force of Granadans. Martín still refused to listen, and he was joined by inhabitants of Cordoba, number 5,000 infantry.

== Battle ==
In April 26, the Crusader force set out from Alcalá la Real and entered Granadan territory. The Crusaders saw the tower known as Torredel Exea. He tries to take it but is repelled: he is wounded and loses, in addition, three men at arms. Confused, he reminds Juan del Sayo that he had prophesied to him that no one would die in the enterprise. The hermit reiterated his promise, understanding that "this will be in battle". The Crusaders then retired to eat before setting fire to the tower with the wood they had gathered for this purpose.

Meanwhile, the Granadan Sultan had gathered a large army, according to chronicles, numbering 5,000 knights and 120,000 infantry, which is gross exaggeration. The Sultan gathered all men between the ages of 16 and 80 to face the Crusaders. The Crusaders were taken by surprise and surrounded. The Crusaders fought with arrows, thunder, slings, and darts until they were all killed, including the master. The Crusaders lost all cavalry and 2,300 infantry. An additional 1,200 men were taken captives. Only 1,500 survived the battle. The Granadans lost 500 infantry in the battle.

== Aftermath ==
The ill-fated battle raised concerns of a new upcoming war with Castile. Rumors spread that the Granadans were preparing an invasion of Valencia. King Henry insisted on peaceful relations while also preparing for any upcoming war. Muhammad decreed he would observe the truce, and in November he asked for an extension.

== Sources ==
- Joseph F. O'Callaghan (2014), The Last Crusade in the West: Castile and the Conquest of Granada.
- Juan de Mata Carriazo (2002), En la frontera de Granada.
- Jose Enrique Lopez de Coca Castaneer (2014), La cruzada particular de un maestre de la Orden de Alcántara (1394) [In Spanish].
