= Astronomical clock, St. Nicholas Church, Stralsund =

14th-century clock in Germany

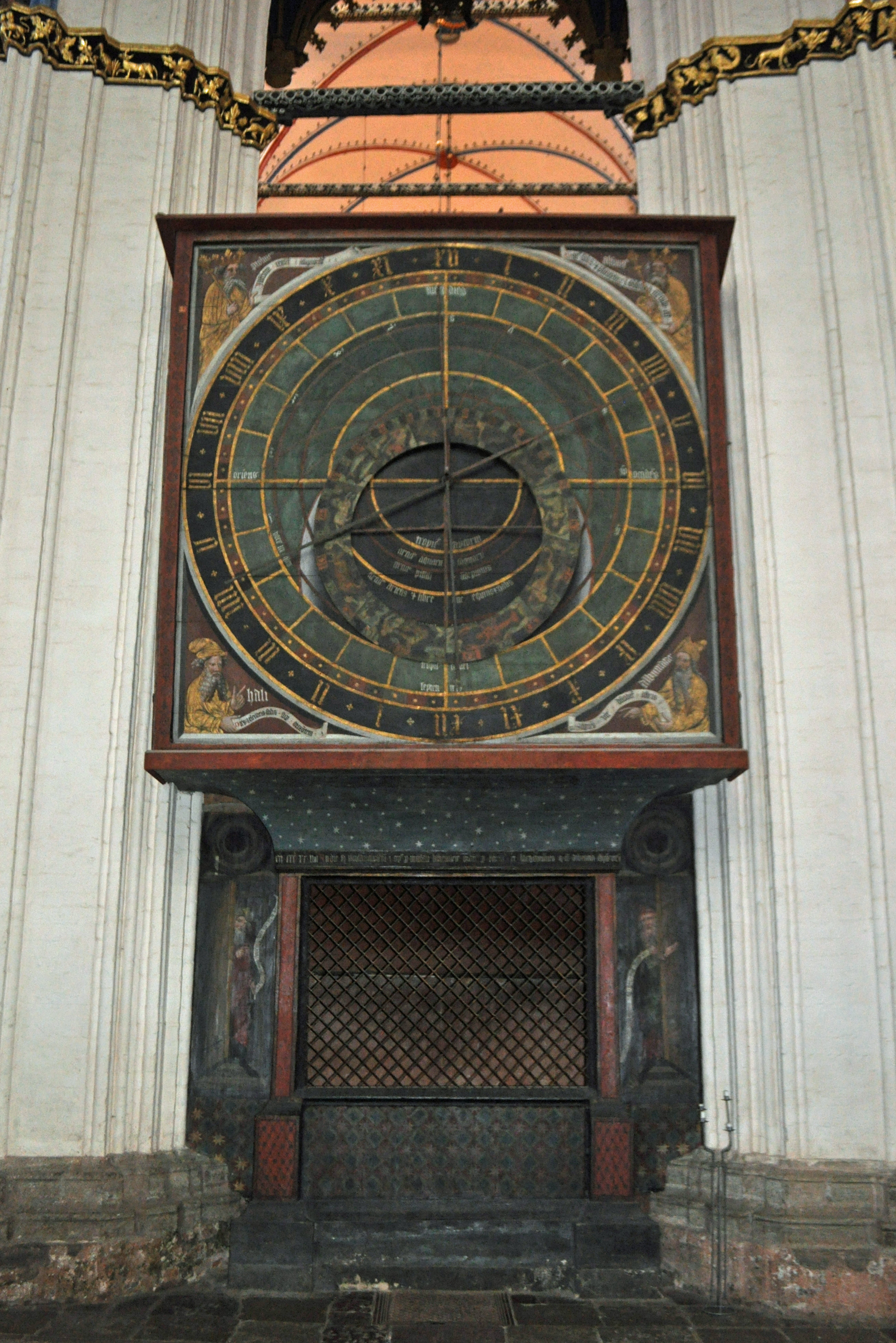
The astronomical clock of St. Nicholas Church, Stralsund (2012)

The astronomical clock of St. Nicholas Church, Stralsund is a 14th century monumental astrolabe clock. It was probably damaged in the 16th century, and has not worked since then. It is the only clock of its kind to have been preserved almost entirely in its original condition. The clockwork and the indications have not been restored.

The Stralsund clock is the oldest mechanical clock in the world to have been preserved in its original state, and one of the oldest fittings in St. Nicholas, first mentioned in 1394. It is positioned in the church's choir, directly behind the high altar. The clock features a self-portrait of its maker Nikolaus Lilienfeld, which is considered to be the oldest portrait of a clockmaker in the German-speaking world.

== History ==
According to an inscription on the clock, it was completed on Saint Nicholas Day (6 December) 1394 by Nikolaus Lilienfeld. It was probably operational only until the Stralsunder Kirchenbrechen of 10 April 1525 during the Reformation.

In 1894, the dial's gothic decorations were restored.

In August 1942, the clock dial was moved to the tower of St. Mary's Church, Grimmen, to protect it from damage during the War. After the War, it was returned to St. Nicholas. The decorations restored in 1894 were lost.

In 1994, the case was restored and the clockwork cleaned and conserved. The clockwork's missing parts were not reintroduced for reasons of conservation, so the clock was deliberately not restored to working order.

== Description ==
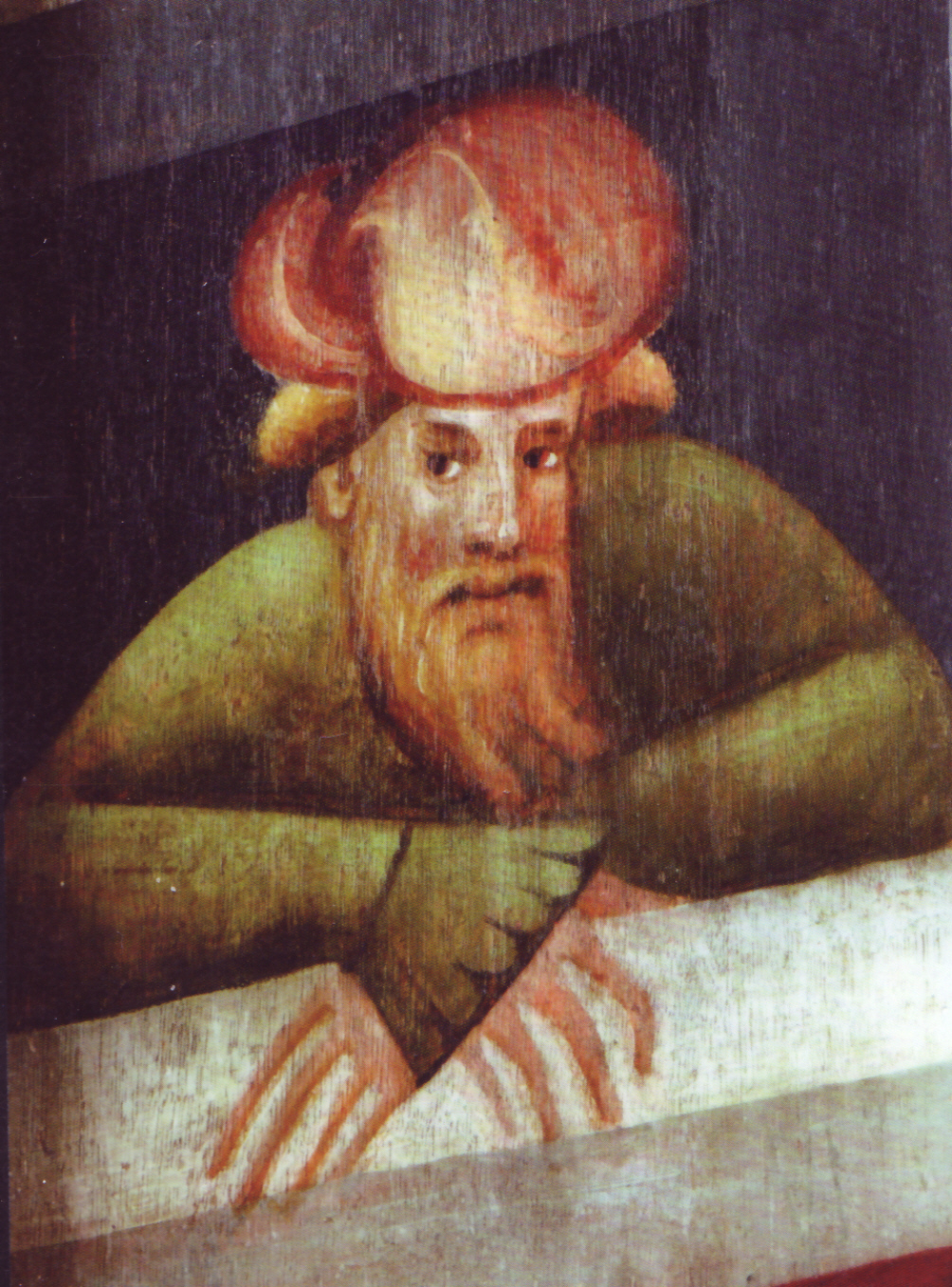
Portrait of Nikolaus Lilienfeld on the clock

=== Clock case ===
The clock's case is square, with sides of approximately 4 metres. The dial is round, and touches the sides of the case frame. In the four corners, the Four Wise Men are depicted:

- top left: Ptolemy, the Greek mathematician, geographer, astronomer, astrologer, music theorist and philosopher. His banner reads "Inferiora reguntur a superioribus" (Lower things are ruled by higher things.)
- top right: Alfonso X, King of Castile, Léon and Galicia, disputed King of Germany, and sponsor of the Alfonsine tables of astronomical data. His banner: "Motus solis et planetarum in obliquo circulo est" (The motion of the sun and the planets is in an oblique circle.)
- bottom left: Ali ibn Ridwan (labelled Hali), the Islamic scholar, physician and astrologer. His banner: "Dies est elevacio solis super orizontem" (The day is the elevation of the sun above the horizon.)
- bottom right: Abu Ma'shar al-Balkhi (labelled Albumazar), the Persian mathematician, astronomer and astrologer. His banner: "Sapiens vir dominabitur astris" (The wise man will rule over the stars.)

On the narrow left side wall of the clock, windows are painted; Nikolaus Lilienfeld, the clockmaker, looks out of one.

=== Underneath the dial ===
The clock case sits on top of a central console with a wide barred window. This was possibly intended to accommodate a calendar disc. The panel paintings either side of the window depict, on the left, a man pushing a door open, with the Latin banner "post deum omnium vivencium vita sol et luna" (After God, the sun and the moon are the life of all living things), representing the morning, and on the right, a man pulling a door closed, with the Latin banner "matutinae imensa munera sed saepe male finiunt" (The morning promises rich rewards, but things often finish badly), representing the evening.

=== Dial ===
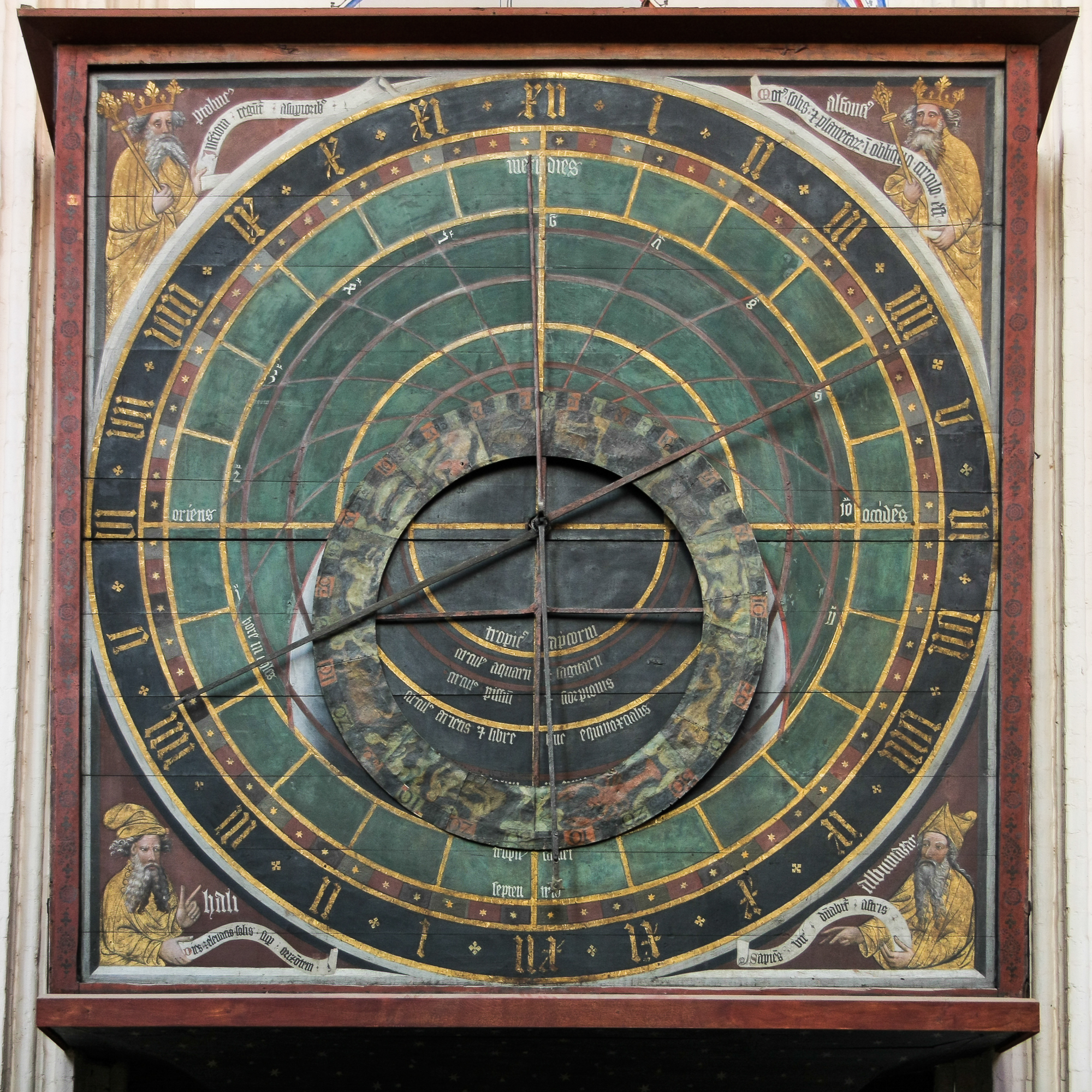
The dial of the astronomical clock

In the clock, the sober display of the time and the movements of the heavens are combined. It is both a clock and a clockwork astrolabe.

== The Baltic Sea clock family ==
Manfred Schukowski classes the Stralsund astronomical clock and several similar clocks in churches around the Baltic Sea as comprising the “Baltic Sea clock family”. All have wooden cases with dimensions of several metres, which are fastened at a height of a few metres between two inner pillars of the church. Often, as in Stralsund, they are positioned behind the high altar, with the dial facing the eastern outer wall of the church. Under the dial there are often wooden pillars, with a rotating calendar disc between them – in Stralsund these are absent, the pillars are merely painted on narrow panels.

== Bibliography ==
- Manfred Schukowski: Wunderuhren. [Marvel clocks]. Thomas Helms Verlag, Schwerin 2006. ISBN 3-935749-03-1
- Manfred Schukowski: Uhren aus Kirchen in hansischer Zeit. [Clocks in churches from Hanseatic times]. In: Deutsche Gesellschaft für Chronometrie, Yearbook 2009. pp. 69–83.
