= St. Nicholas Church, Stralsund =

St. Nicholas Church
- Nikolaikirche
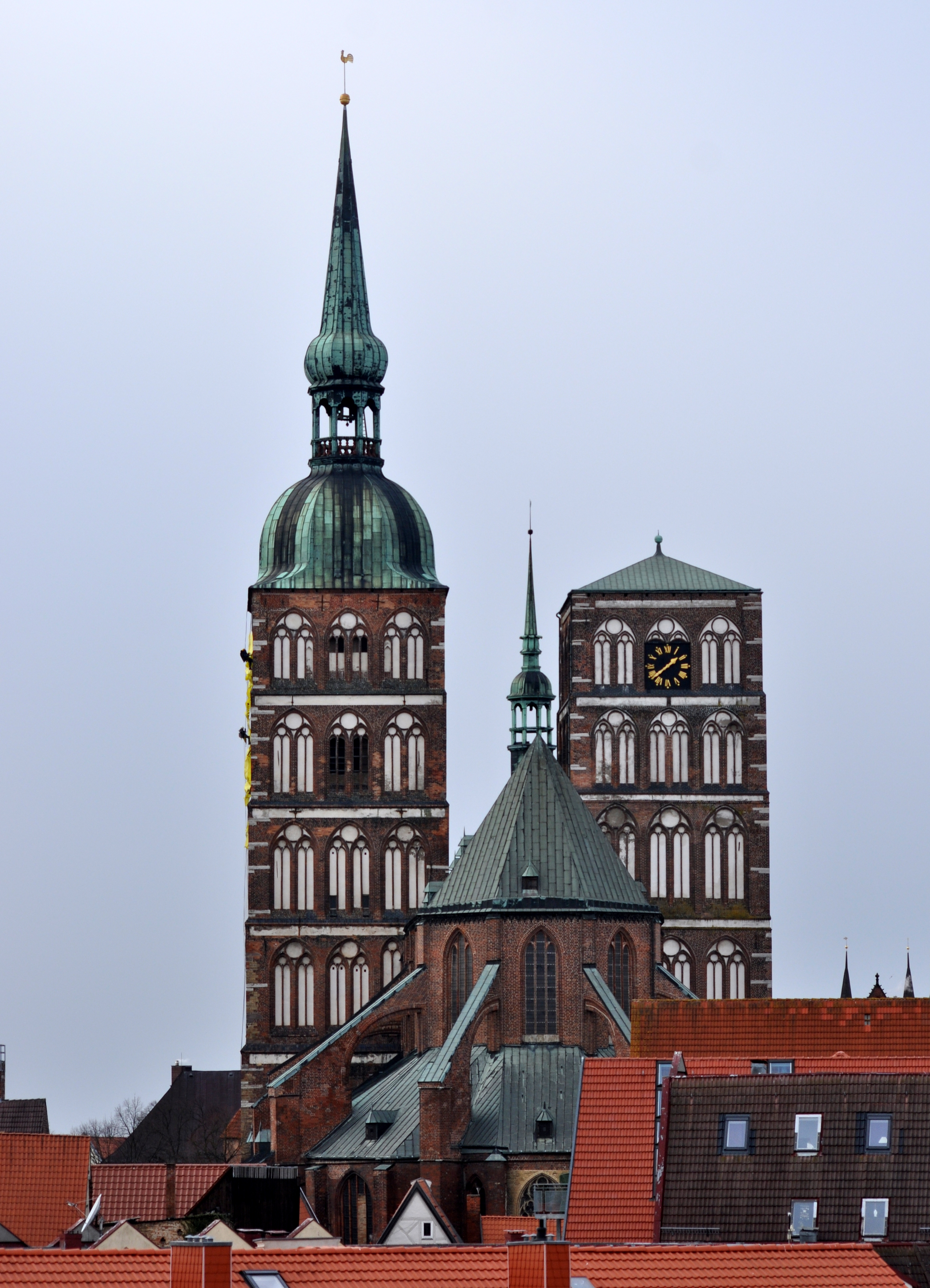
- St. Nicholas Church in Stralsund, seen from the roof of the Ozeaneum

- Location of St. Nicholas Church in Stralsund, Mecklenburg-Vorpommern, Germany St. Nicholas Church (Germany)
- 54°18′55″N 13°05′29″E
- Location: Stralsund
- Country: Germany
- Denomination: Lutheran
- Previous denomination: Catholic
- Website: nikolai-stralsund.de

History
- Dedication: Saint Nicholas of Myra
- Dedicated: 1276

Architecture
- Architectural type: Gothic
- Groundbreaking: 1234

St. Nicholas Church (German: Nikolaikirche) is the oldest of the three major parish churches of the Hanseatic city of Stralsund in Germany. It was dedicated in 1279 to Saint Nicholas of Myra, the patron saint of sailors. Since 1524 it has been an Evangelical Lutheran church. It is one of the earliest examples of the introduction of the cathedral pattern of northern France into the Brick Gothic architecture of the Baltic region. As part of the historic centre of Stralsund, St. Nicholas Church was inscribed on the UNESCO World Heritage List in 2002.

== History ==
The construction of St. Nicholas Church began as a hall church with a tower in 1234, after Stralsund acquired city rights. The planning and building in the oldest part of Stralsund continued alongside the planning of the Town Hall in the Old Market. This suggests that Nicholas Church was from the beginning intended to be the council church of the city. A council church was not just a place of worship, but was also the location for holding board meetings, receiving ambassadors, announcing laws and regulations, handling legal cases, and preserving city archives.

After 1270, the unfinished St. Nicholas Church was rebuilt as a basilica, following the design of St. Mary's Church in Lübeck. The just-completed choir of the church hall had to be demolished to make way for the choir of the new basilica, which consisted of an inner choir and an ambulatory. Around the chancel, which consisted of five sides of an imaginary octagon, five chapels were created. Parts of the walls of the side aisles served as an abutment from then on. In the beginning, the building material of the church building was brick. Over the course of time, at least 65 different types of stone were used.

The construction of the western tower began in 1300. By 1314, the tower had reached a height of 13 meters. At that time, the council decided to build two towers. Around 1350, the construction of the nave between the two towers was completed. The buttresses of the aisles were connected externally to create space in the interior. The buttresses were thus drawn inward and vaulted chapels were built in the space freed up between the towers. Of the two towers, the south tower was first completed, probably in the early 15th century. This was followed by the completion of construction of the north tower. The two Gothic towers were equally high.

The wealth of the city of Stralsund was reflected in the very large number of altars in the church. There were no less than 56 altars in the chancel, nave, and between the buttresses of the aisles. The bulk of the altars were removed from the church after the Bildersturm of 1525. Since the introduction of Reformation, the chapels were mainly used as spaces for burying distinguished citizens.

A fire in 1662 destroyed the wooden spires of the towers. In 1667, the southern tower was provided with a Baroque dome, while the northern tower was closed with a temporary roof.

During the American bombing of Stralsund on October 6, 1944, the roof and windows of St. Nicholas Church were damaged. Repairs started in 1947.

== Reformation ==
On June 1, 1523, the Protestant reformer Christian Ketelhot preached for the first time in St. Nicholas Church. The city council turned a blind eye to this, especially because some councillors and the mayor himself had converted to Protestantism. The new doctrine allowed both Catholics and Protestants to worship in the same church, but Catholic priests and monks were increasingly mocked on the streets and Catholic priests were often openly ridiculed or belittled during sermons. The conflict escalated during the autumn of 1524, when the Dominican lector Wilhelm Lowe was dragged from the pulpit and abused. In 1525, the Bildersturm broke out in the church, which then spread to other churches in Stralsund. Altars and shrines were destroyed or stolen. A majority of the population and members of the city council then converted to Protestantism. Together with the reformer Johann Kureke, Ketelhot was one of the first Protestant ministers of St. Nicholas Church.

== Furnishings ==
=== High altar ===
The high altar was made by a Stralsund sculptor around 1480. During World War II the altar was removed from the church and stowed in a safe place, but it was nevertheless partially destroyed. In 1948 the damaged altar returned to the church. In 1997, a new crucifix built by Halberstadt artist Johann-Peter Hinz was installed. The central part of the 6.70 wide by 4.20 meters high altar shows the crucifixion of Christ. The wings and the central part feature numerous carved figures, all depicting the story of the Passion. The predella is dedicated to Christ's birth. In 1992, the painted wings were taken from the altar and now protrude from the two pillars on the left and right of the altar. These depict scenes from the life of Saint Anne and Mary, mother of Jesus.

=== Other altars and pews ===
The church once housed 56 altars. Most of the altars were owned by guilds, though some were owned individual families. They were scattered throughout the church, often attached to the pillars. During the Bildersturm of 1525, many altars were lost. The altar of the tailors' guild, built at the end of the 15th century and placed in a privileged position near the high altar, was preserved. The mayor's altar (1510), the altar of the Junge family (1430), the so-called "altar of the Bergen merchants", the altars of the basketmakers and saddlemakers, and the Olav altar were also preserved.

=== Schlüter altar (main altar) ===
The Schlüter altar was designed by the Prussian court architect Andreas Schlüter, best known for designing the Amber Room. The main altar between the nave and chancel was installed in place of the former rood loft. The construction work was done by the Stralsund sculptor Thomas Phalert, a student of Schlüter. In 1708 the work was finished, but it took until 1733 for the painting to be finished, and the gilding was introduced only in 1735. In the center the altar, which has been decorated on both sides, is a carved relief of the Eye of Providence surrounded by a cloud wreath with angels praising it and playing musical instruments, and flanked by column pillars with standing angels in front of them. Above it is a representation of the Last Supper. The grand altar is crowned with a crucifix and statues that represent hope and faith. The fences with putti and garlands on either side of the altar are from 1707-1708.

=== Statue of Virgin and Child with Saint Anne ===
In the north ambulatory, there is a statue of Anna Selbdritt (Virgin and Child with Saint Anne) dating back to the late 13th century. The statue shows the remnants of the original paint and is one of the earliest statues of Anna Selbdritt in the Baltic region.

=== Astronomical clock ===
Behind the high altar is the astronomical clock, which was built in 1394 by Nikolaus Lilienfeld. The clock is part of a whole series of monumental clocks, which were installed since the 14th century in churches in different cities of the Hanseatic League. It has a wheel train with a mechanical escapement. In addition to day and night times, the positions of the sun, moon, and fixed stars can also be read off the clock. It is the oldest almost completely preserved astronomical clock in the Baltic region and also the oldest mechanical clock in the world that still contains its original wheels.

=== Pewage of Riga merchants ===
Four oak reliefs from the altar of the Stralsund merchants who travelled to Riga for conducting trade still remain. The tables were created in 1420. After the demolition of the altar, the reliefs got put into the church benches, until they were rediscovered in 1840. Usually such reliefs contain religious imagery, but the remaining remnants of the pew of the Riga merchants' guild are on purely secular themes. Three of the four reliefs show Russians, with their characteristic long beards and wearing fur, hunting and harvesting honey and resin (products which were shipped from Riga to Stralsund). The fourth table shows the marketing of these products by Russians to Stralsund merchants.

== Organs ==
St. Nicholas Church has two large and two small organs:

- The large organ was built by Carl August Buchholz in 1841 and has 56 stops, three manuals, and a pedal. It is the largest organ built in Germany in the period 1800-1850 which is still functional today. During 2003-2006 the organ was restored by the organ makers Wegscheider of Dresden and Klais of Bonn, and restored to its original condition.
- The choir organ of the church, located between the southern side of the church and the choir, was built by the organ builder Alexander Schuke from Potsdam in 1986. The drag loading tool with mechanical action holds 22 records distributed over two manuals and a pedal.
- In addition to the two larger organs, since 2012 there is a smaller organ in the children's church. It is a positive from 1965 built by the company Reinhard Schmeißer from Rochlitz.

== Painting ==
The first attempts to renew the church's medieval colour scheme were made in 1891. Remains found near the organ were used as an example. The Berlin painter August Grimmer painted the leaf decorations in the arcades of the choir. The nave, the aisles, and tower chapels were painted by the Linnemann brothers from Frankfurt. From 1980, after thorough research, the restoration of the medieval color patterns was performed.

== Gallery ==
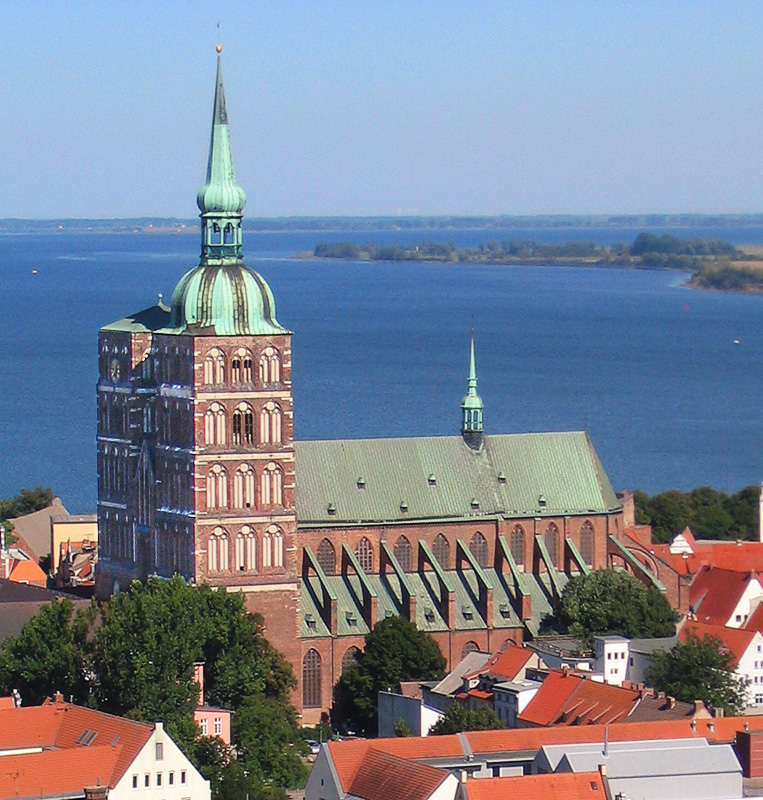
View from St. Mary's Church

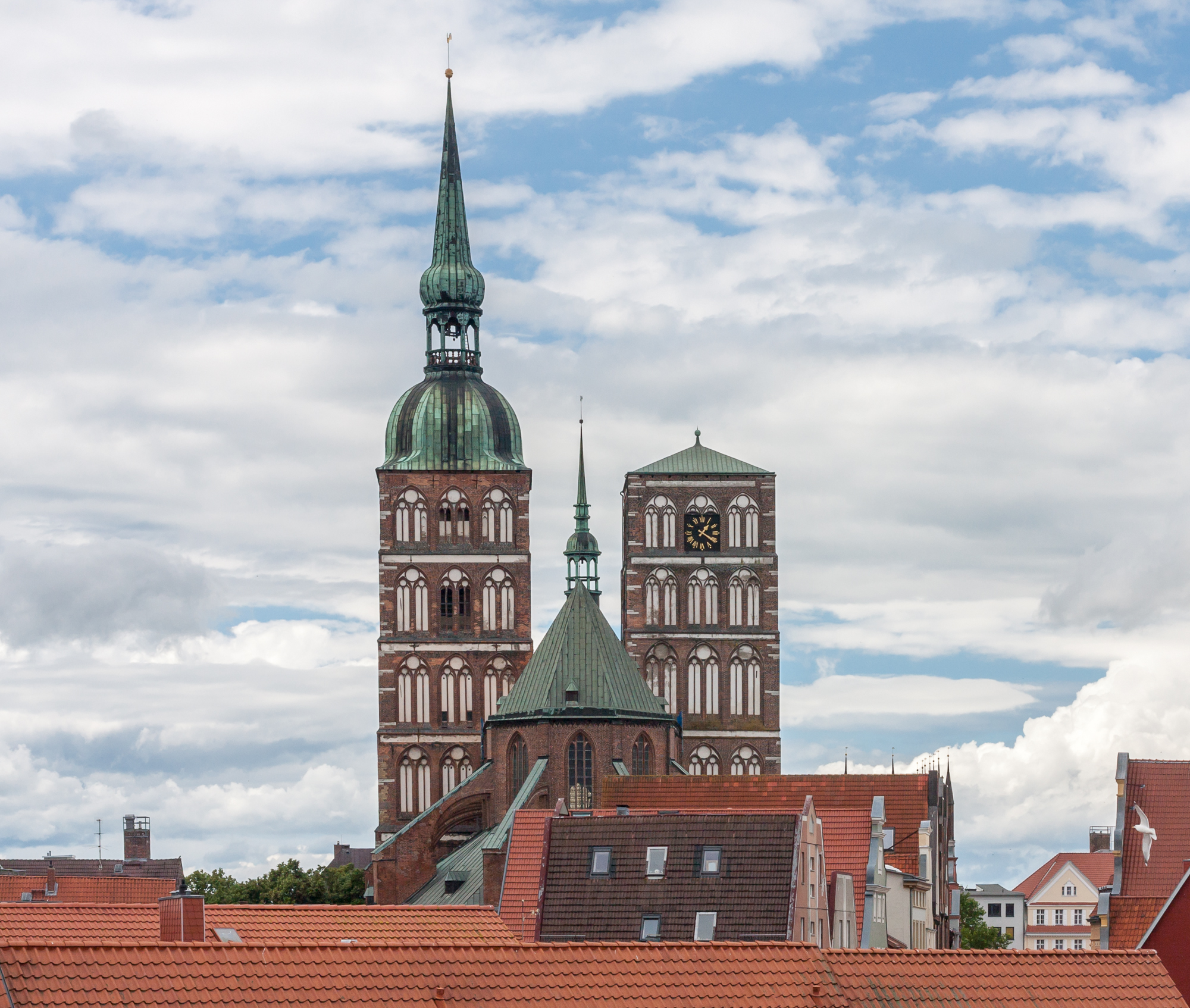
Towers and choir, seen from the harbor

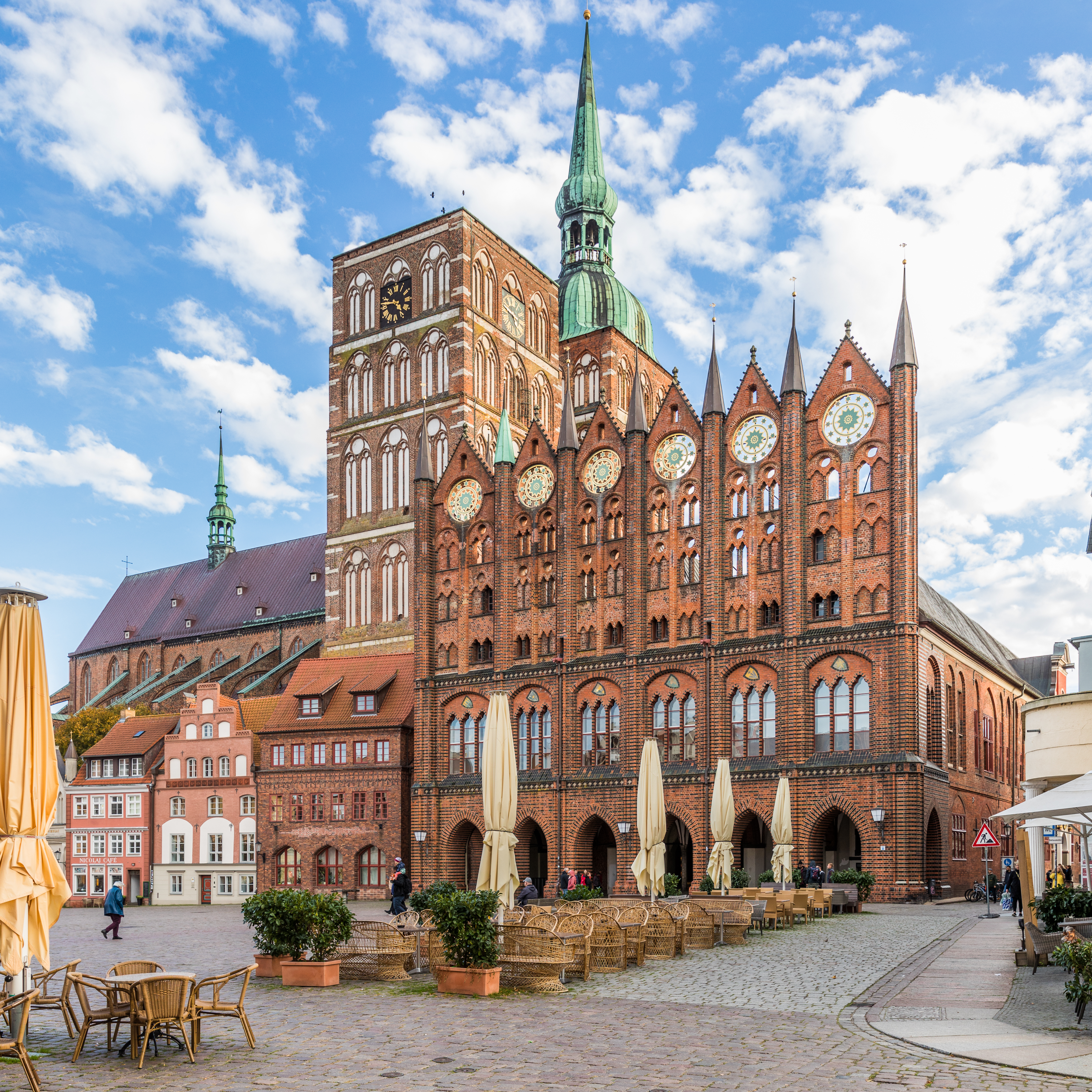
View from the Town Hall in the Old Market

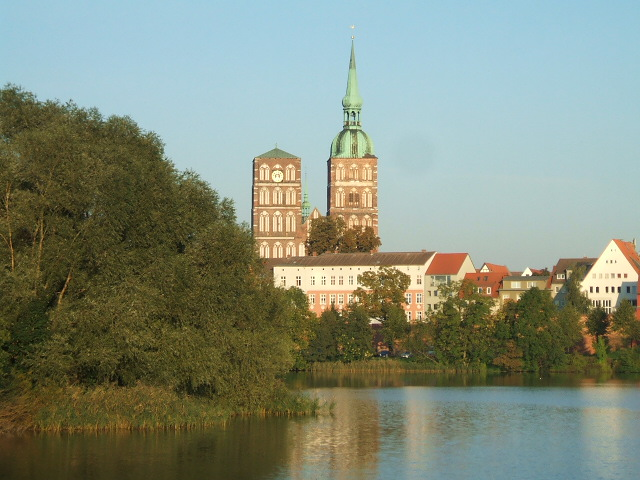
View from the west, Knieperteich in the foreground

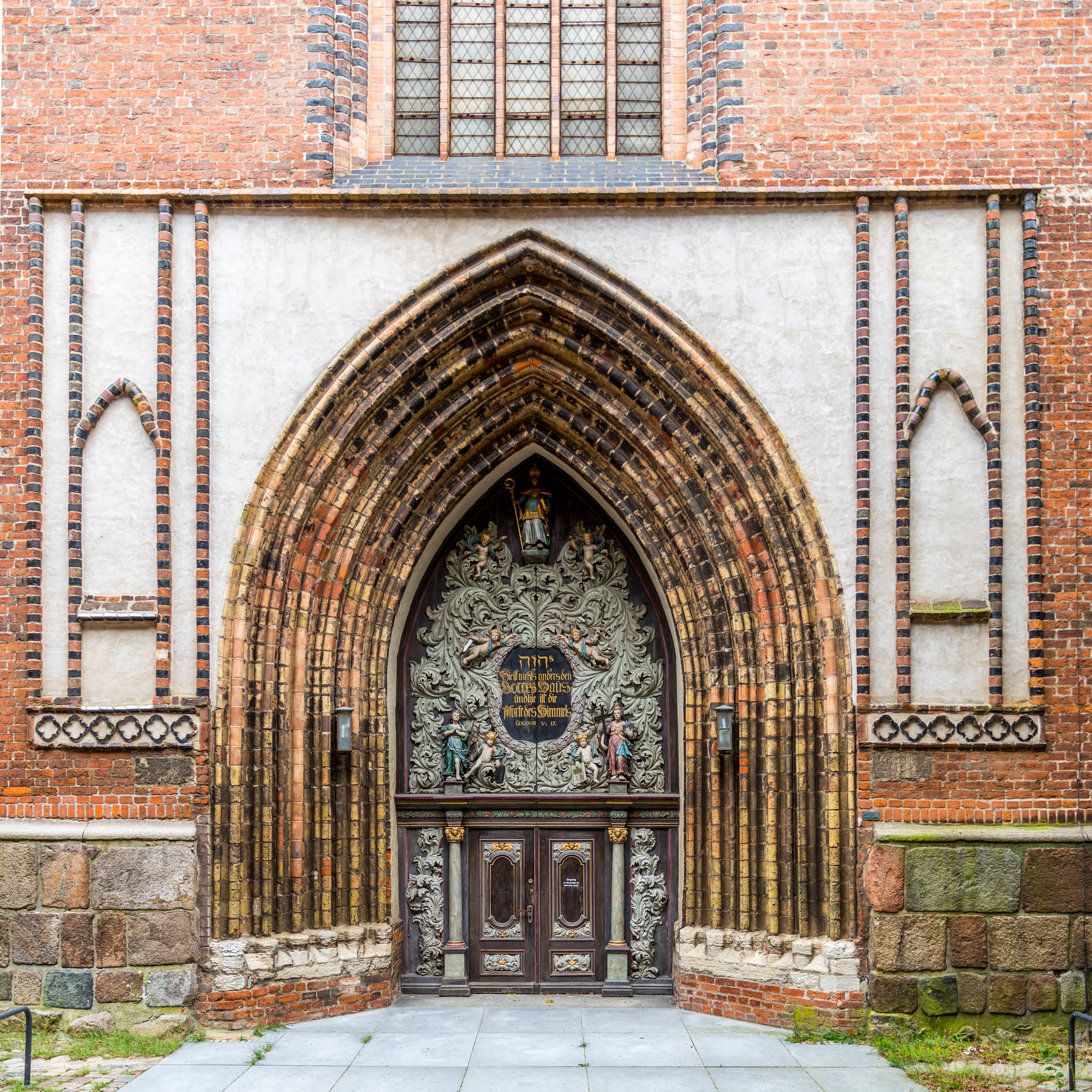
West portal

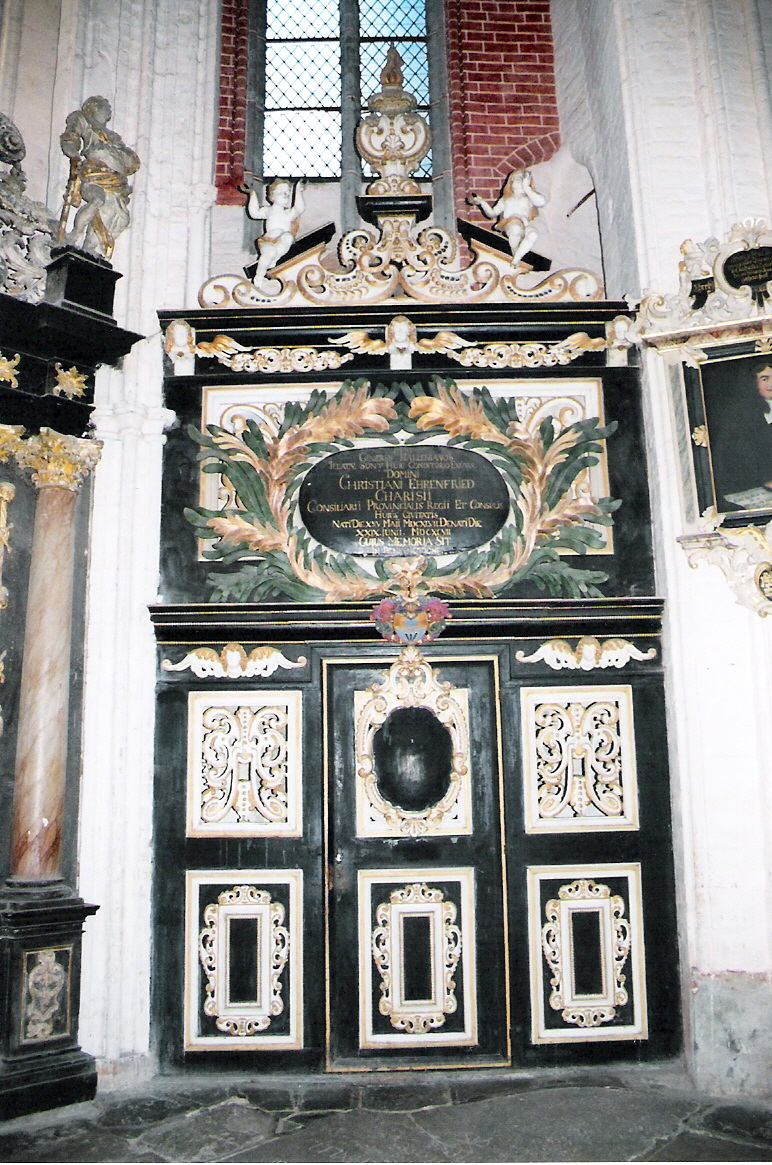
Charisius chapel

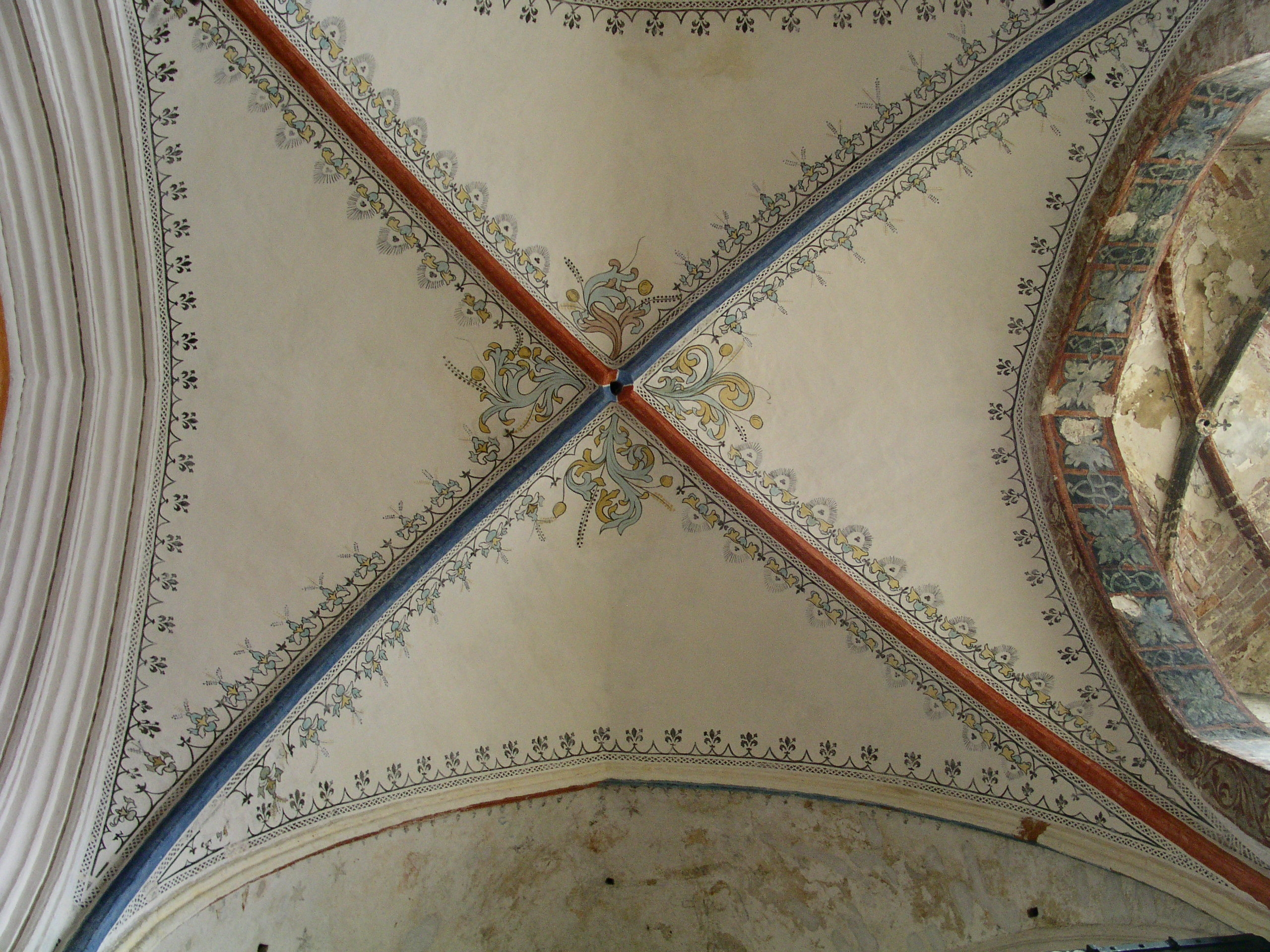
The painted vault

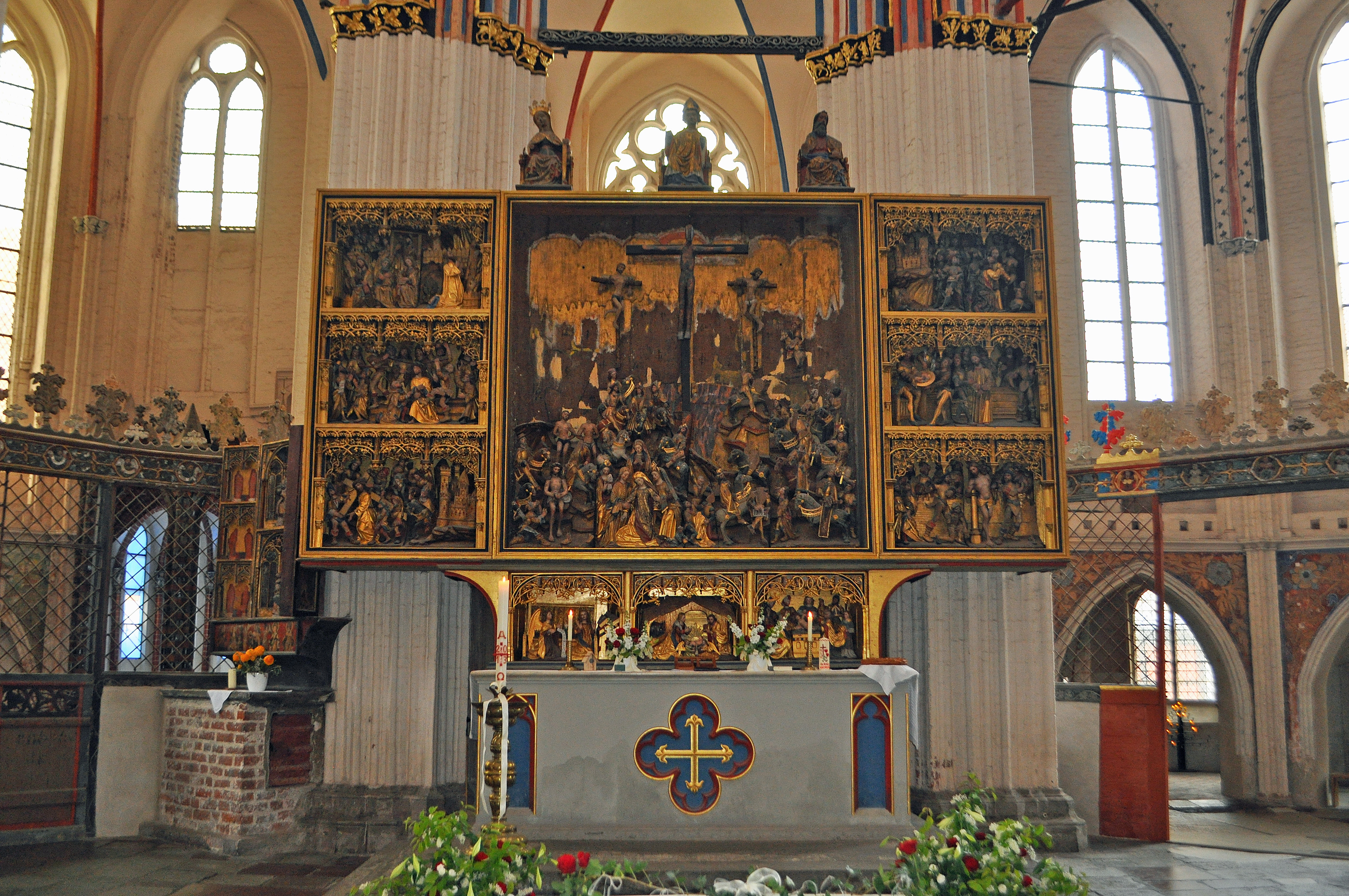
The high altar

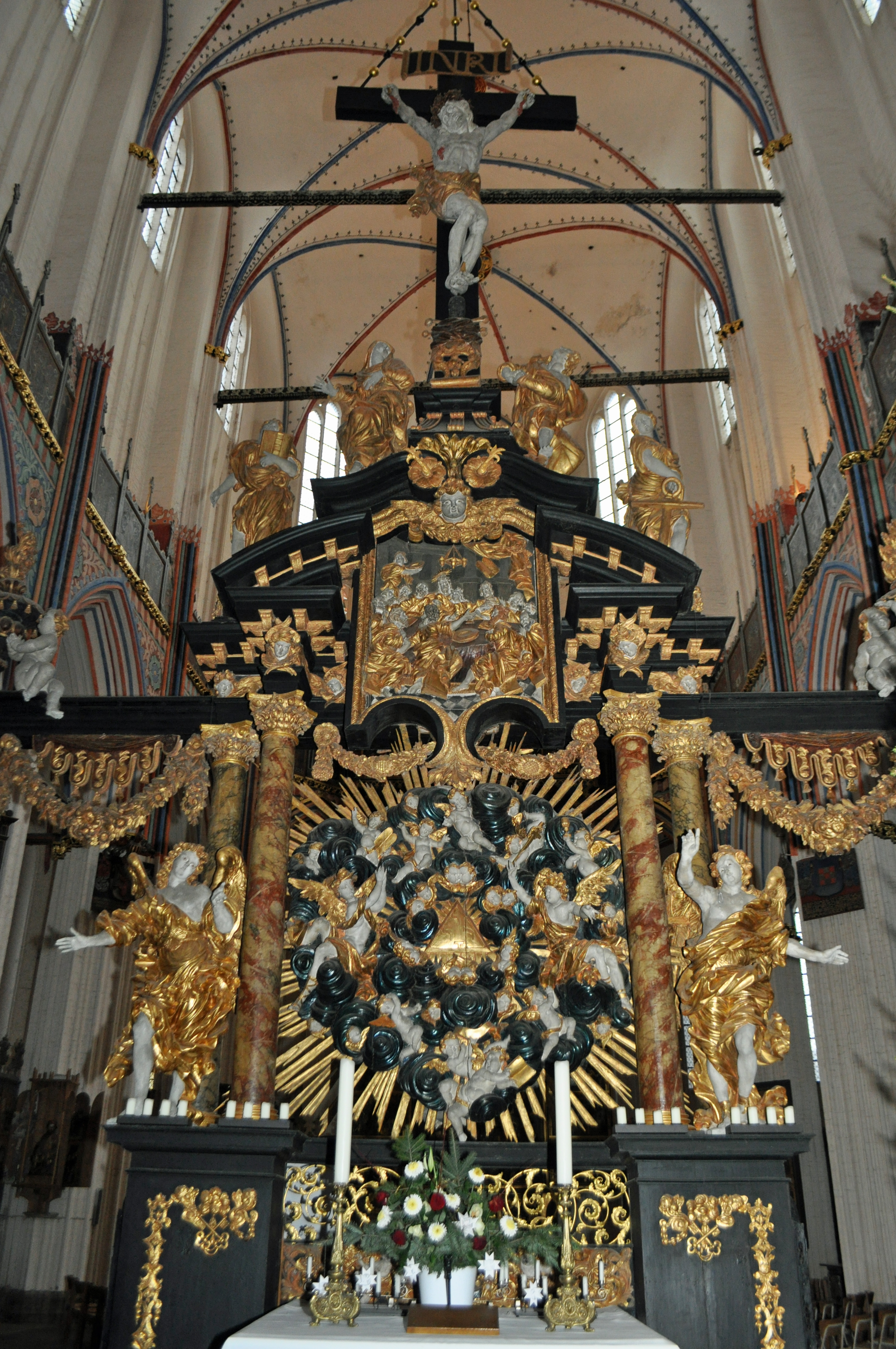
The main altar from the west

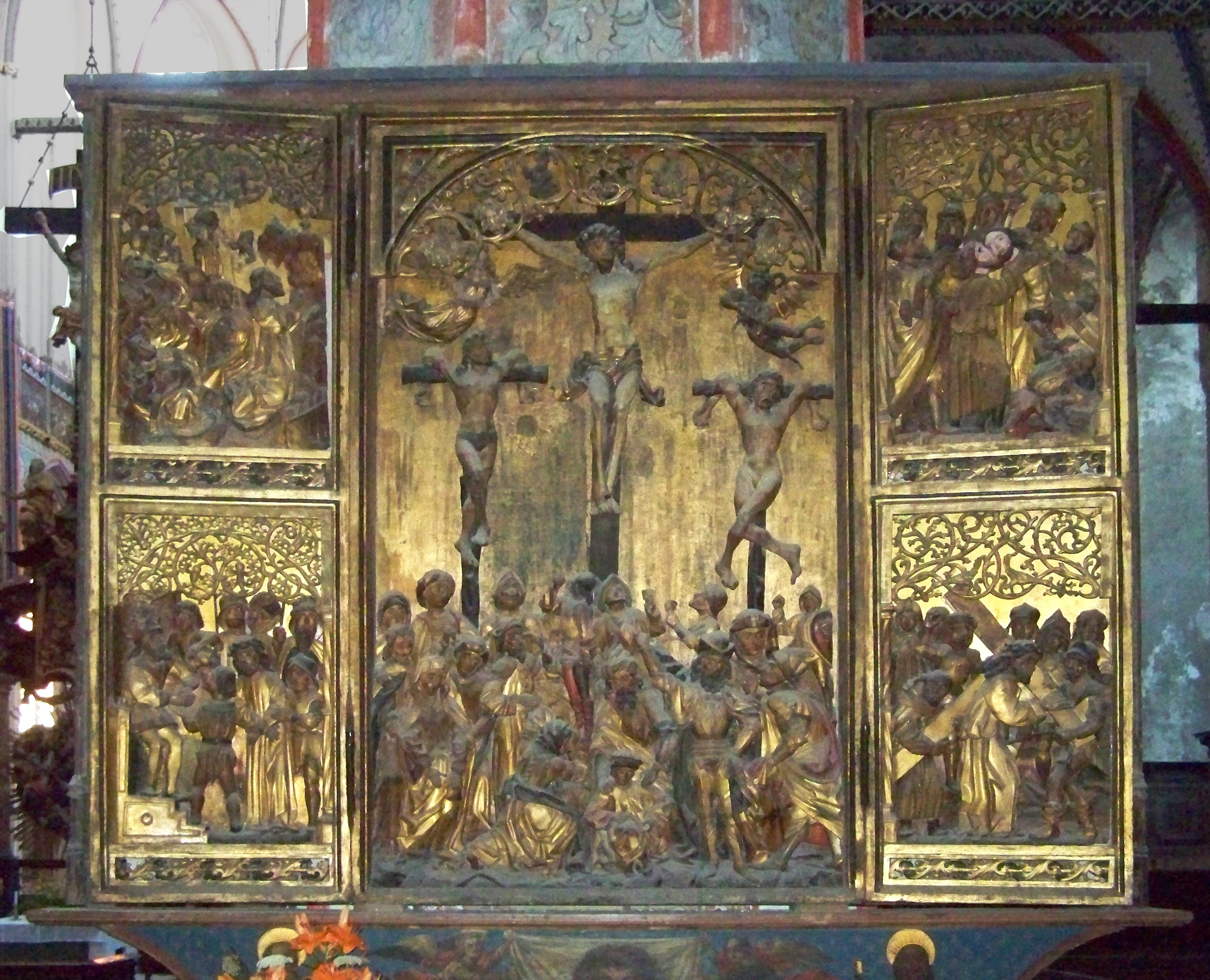
The altar of the Bergen traders

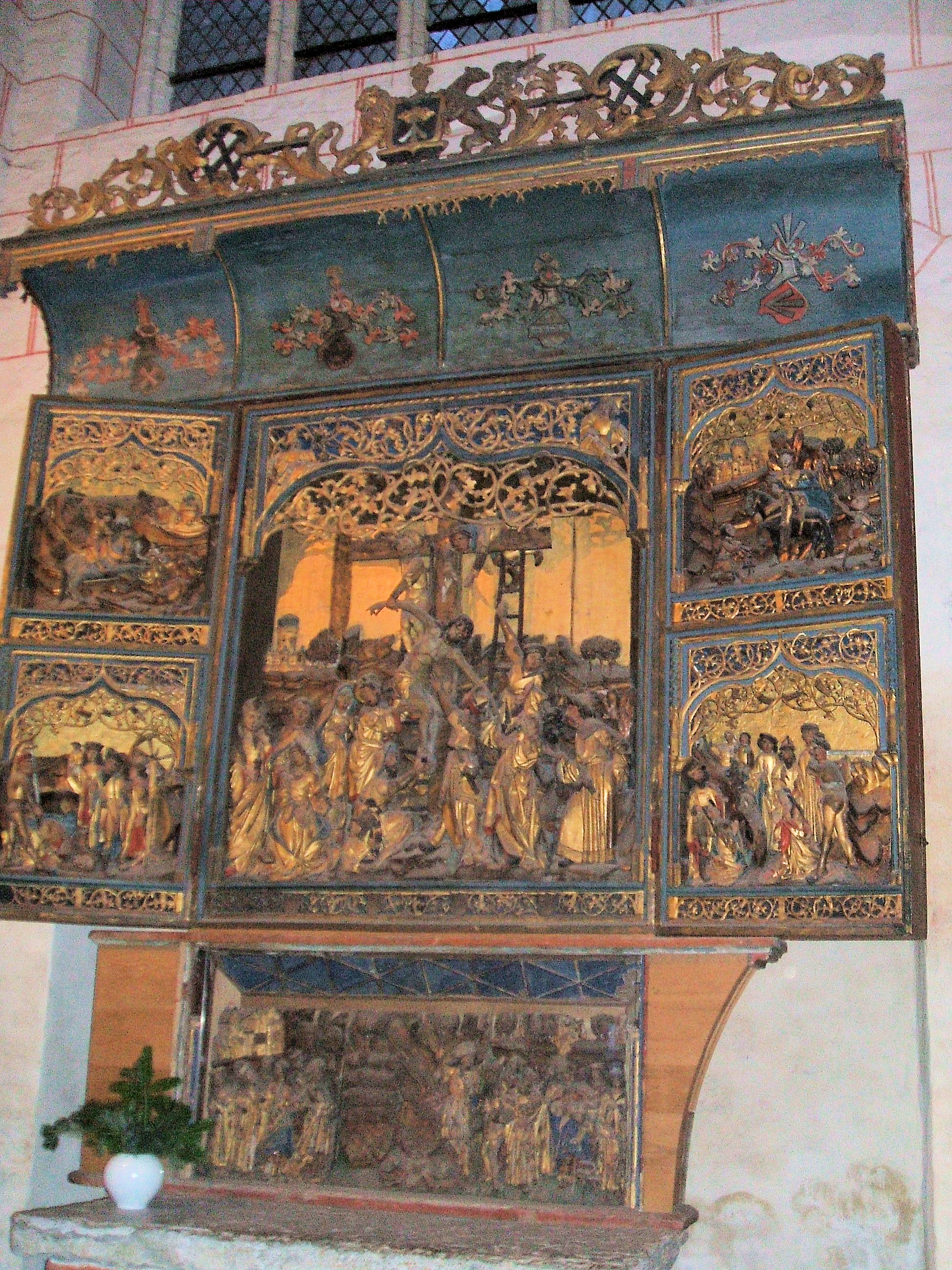
The mayor's altar

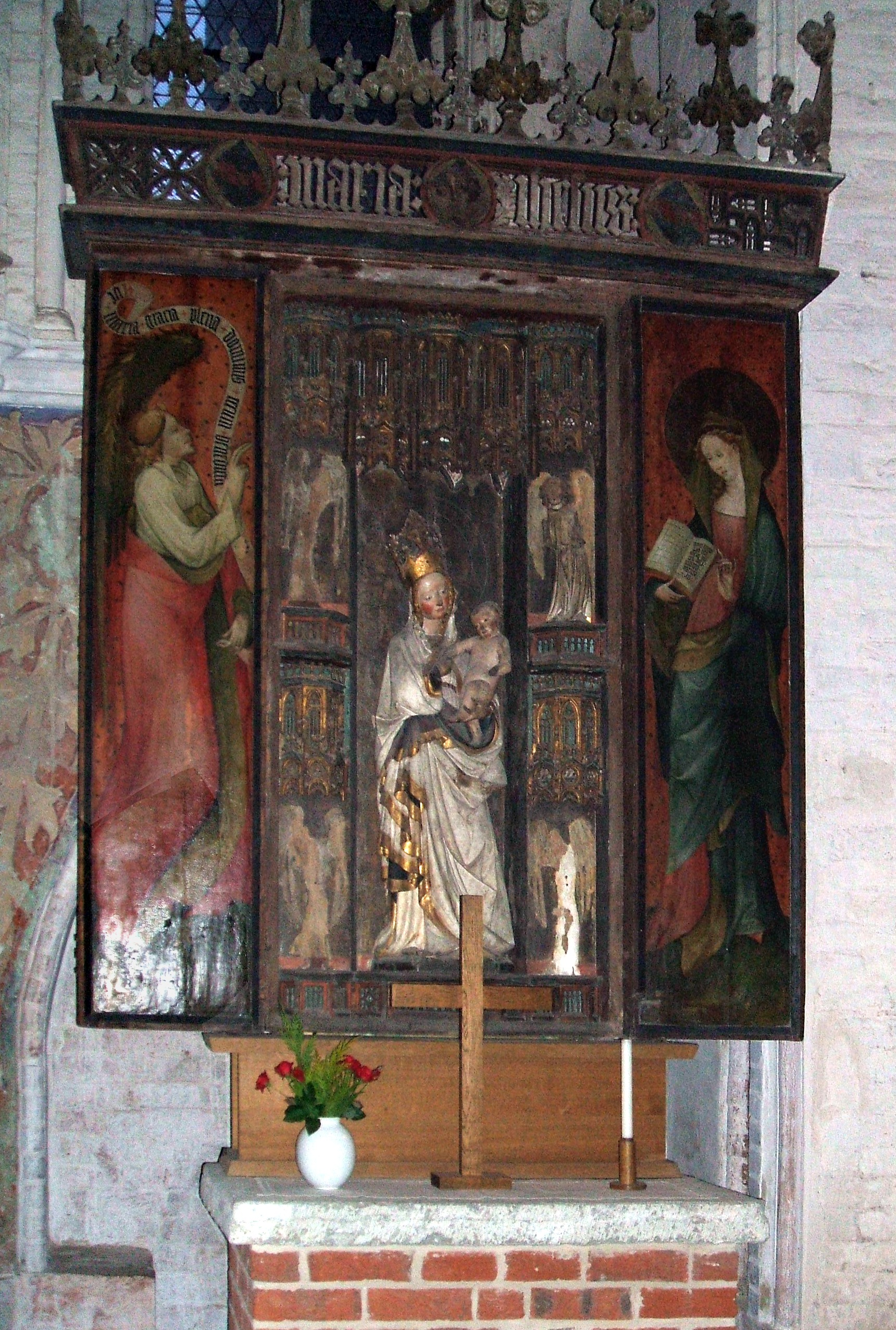
The altar of the Junge family

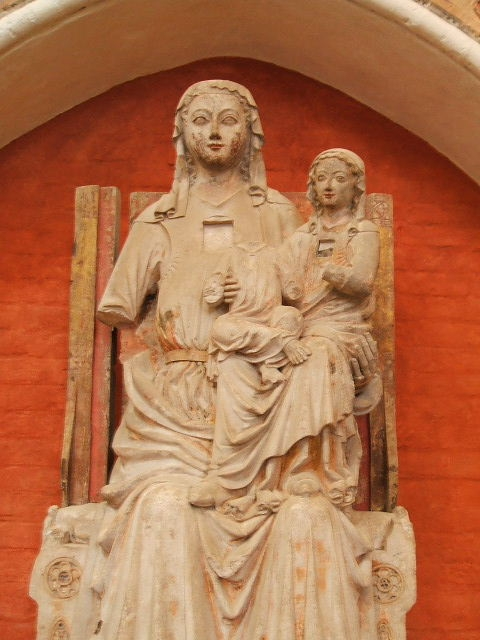
Sculpture of Virgin and Child with Saint Anne

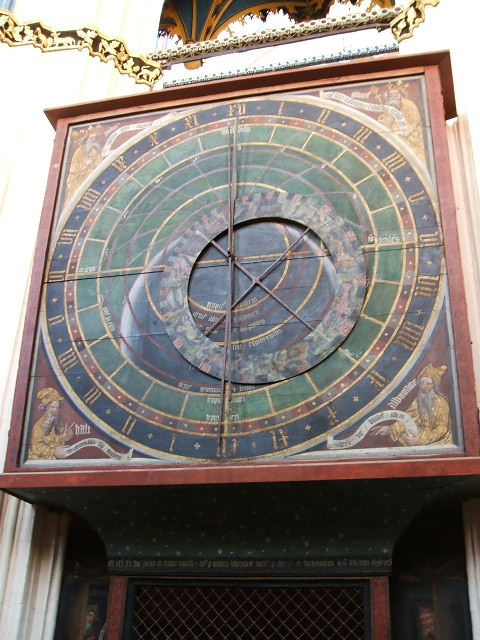
The astronomical clock of Nicholas Lilienfeld

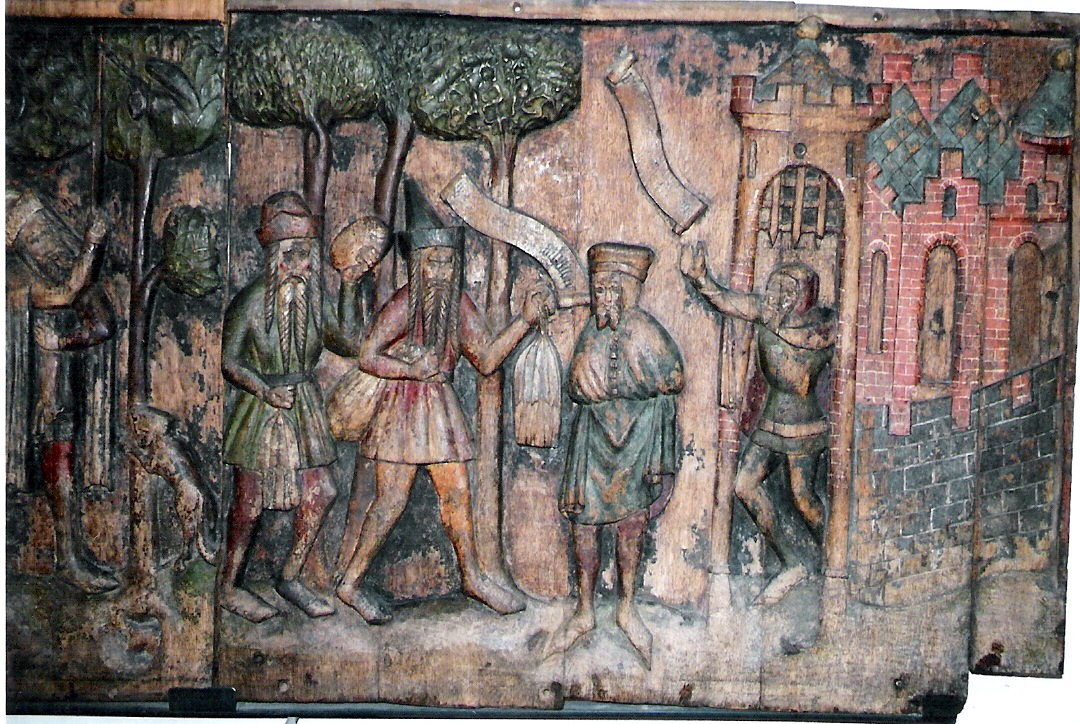
Right panel of the Riga traders' pew

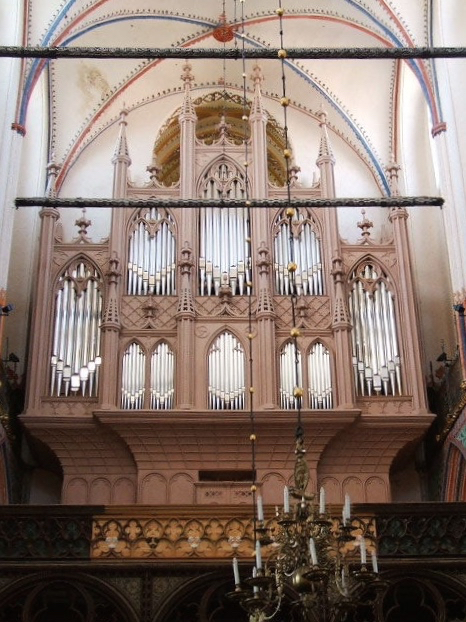
Buchholz organ

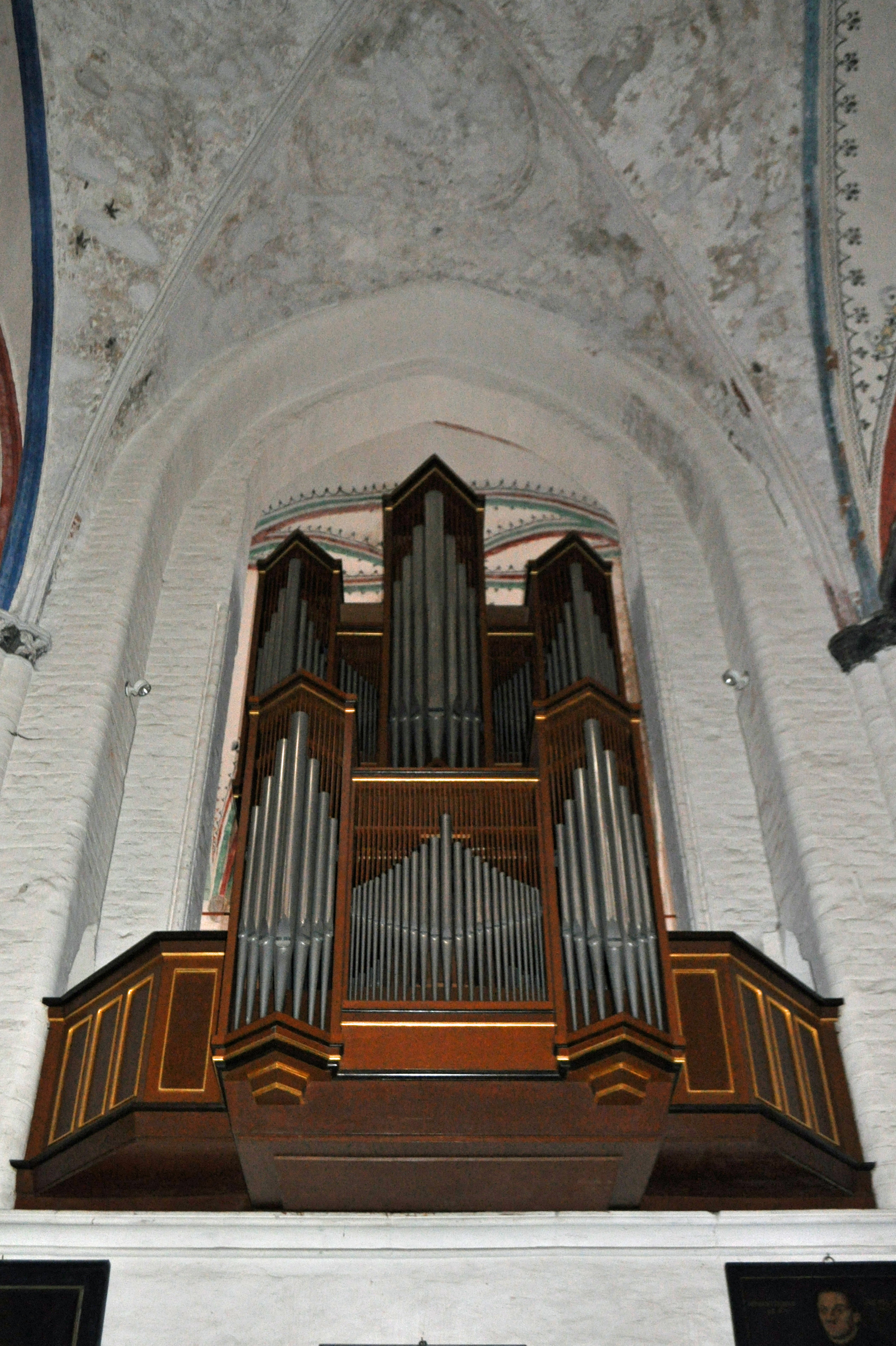
The Schuke organ next to the high altar

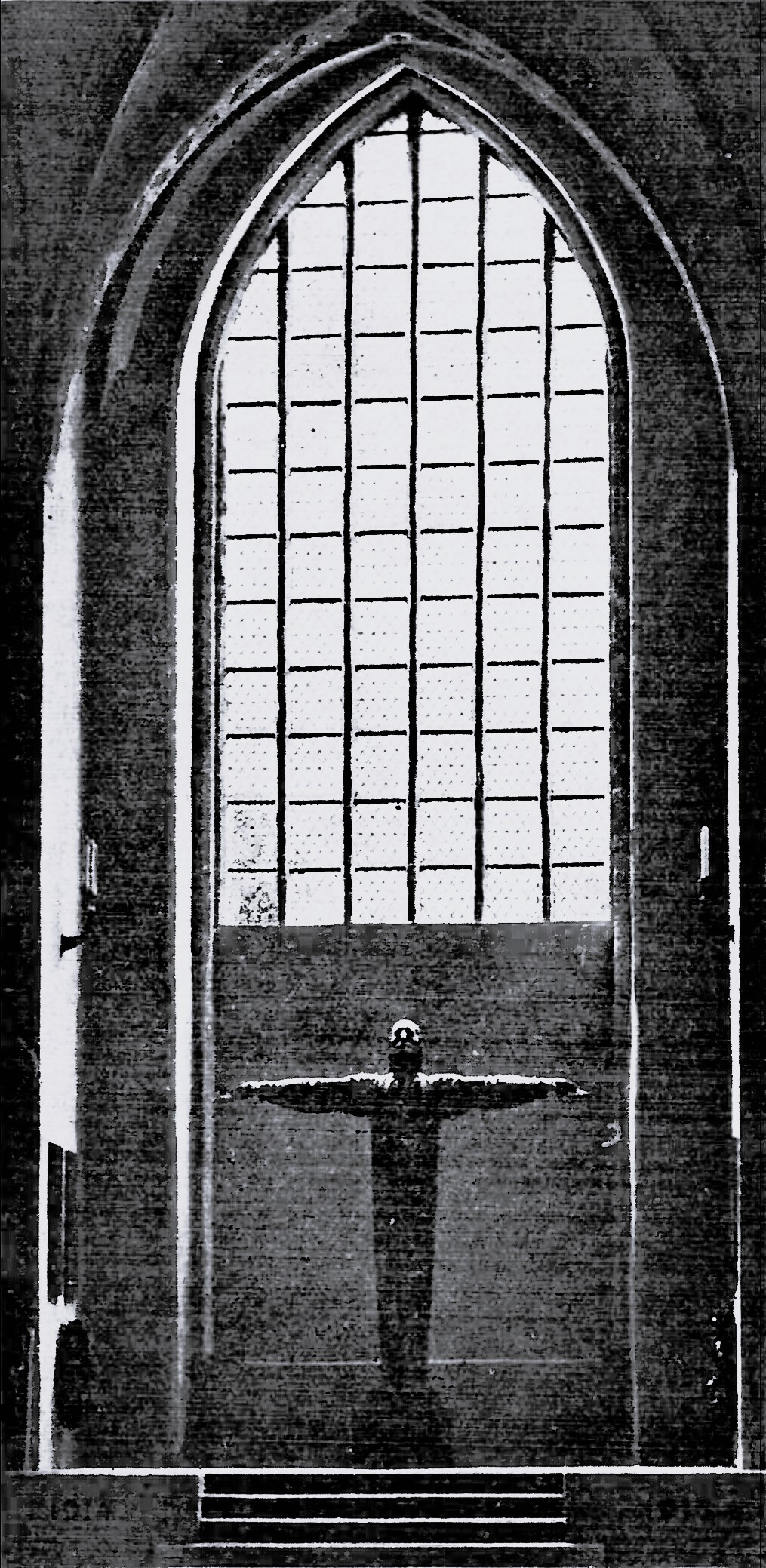
Memorial, Hans Schwegerle (1931)
