= Ryd Abbey =

Former Cistercian monastery in Schleswig-Holstein

Coordinates: 54°49′54″N 09°32′36″E

Ryd Abbey or Rüde Abbey (Danish: Ryd Kloster; German: Rüdekloster; Latin: Rus regis) was a Cistercian monastery in Munkbrarup that formerly occupied the present site of Glücksburg Castle in Glücksburg on the Flensburg Fjord in the Schleswig-Flensburg district of Schleswig-Holstein, Germany.

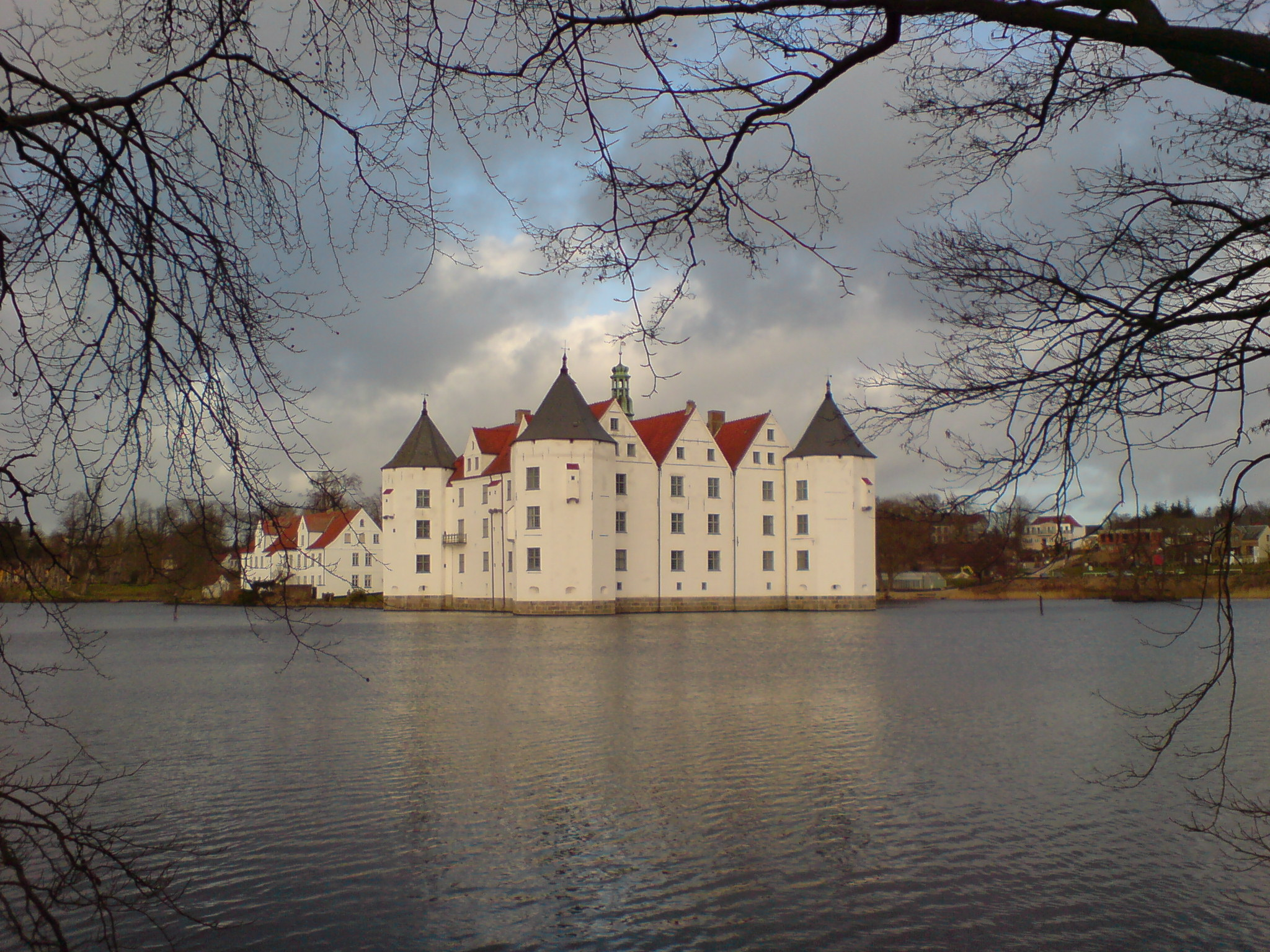
Glücksburg Castle, on the site of the former Ryd Abbey

== History ==
Ryd Abbey was settled by the Cistercians of Esrum Abbey in 1210. The monastic community originated however in St. Michael's Abbey in Schleswig, a Benedictine double monastery which had become disorderly, with a reputation for immorality and drunkenness. In 1192 Nicholas I, the de facto officiating Bishop of Schleswig, therefore moved the monks to a remote site, where they established Guldholm Abbey. This was not a success, and the monks were moved again to the site at Munkbrarup. This coincided with the arrival in Denmark of the then new and severe Cistercian order, to whom the bishop entrusted the new foundation, with a substantial endowment.

The monastery was thus at last placed on a stable footing and prospered under the more rigorous discipline of the Cistercians.

Later in the century however the abbey acquired unwelcome notoriety because of the abbot Arnfast, who was accused of murdering King Christopher I of Denmark by giving him poisoned communion wine on 29 May 1259 in Ribe Cathedral, in retaliation for the king's imprisonment and mistreatment of the Archbishop of Lund, Jacob Erlandsen. In the following year Archbishop Jacob named Arnfast bishop of Aarhus, but the pope made another appointment and Arnfast never assumed office. Arnfast was declared an enemy of the new king, Erik V, and fled to Øm Abbey. When the king came to hear of it, he accused the monks at Øm of harboring a criminal, but despite a search throughout Denmark's monastic houses, Arnfast could not be located.

In 1433 the abbey was granted the lucrative right to the income from the pilgrimage chapel at a miraculous hermitage nearby, the Klues.

At its greatest extent the monastery precinct measured 350 meters long and 200 meters wide. It consisted of a church and cemetery, hospital, guest house, farm and a wing for lay brothers, with kitchen and refectory.

== Annales Ryenses ==
The abbey is perhaps best known as the place of origin of the Annales Ryenses, or the Annals of Ryd (Danish: Rydårbogen), which chronicles the history of Denmark from the legendary king Dan to King Erik VI (Erik Menved). The chronicle was started not long after the Cistercians took over Ryd Abbey and ends in 1288. It is clear from the writing that the writers were southern Jutlanders and thus have a slightly different perspective from that of other contemporary chroniclers. The tone is distinctly anti-German. Along with Saxo's Gesta Danorum, the Annales Ryenses constitutes one of the main Danish sources for the history of the Middle Ages.

== Dissolution ==
The monastery was suppressed in 1538 after Denmark had become officially Lutheran on 30 October 1536. The monks were turned out of the monastery and scattered: some simply went to work on farms; others travelled south to seek shelter in other Cistercian monasteries in Germany.

== Glücksburg Castle ==
The abandoned buildings fell quickly into disrepair. In 1582 Duke John the Younger of Schleswig-Holstein-Sonderburg ordered the remains to be demolished, and had the stone reused for the construction of Glücksburg Castle, which still occupies the site.

== Archaeology ==
The site has been investigated archaeologically a number of times, most recently in 2005, when excavations under the drained castle lake found numerous artefacts, the foundations of the monastic buildings and church and the monastic cemetery.

== Sources and external links ==
- Historische Gesellschaft Glücksburg (Glücksburg Historical Society) (in German)
- Abendblatt.de: Report of site investigation 2005 (in German)
- Pictures of the site and of the drained pond at Schloss Glücksburg (in German)
- Klöster in Schleswig-Holstein (in German)
