= Liber daticus vetustior =

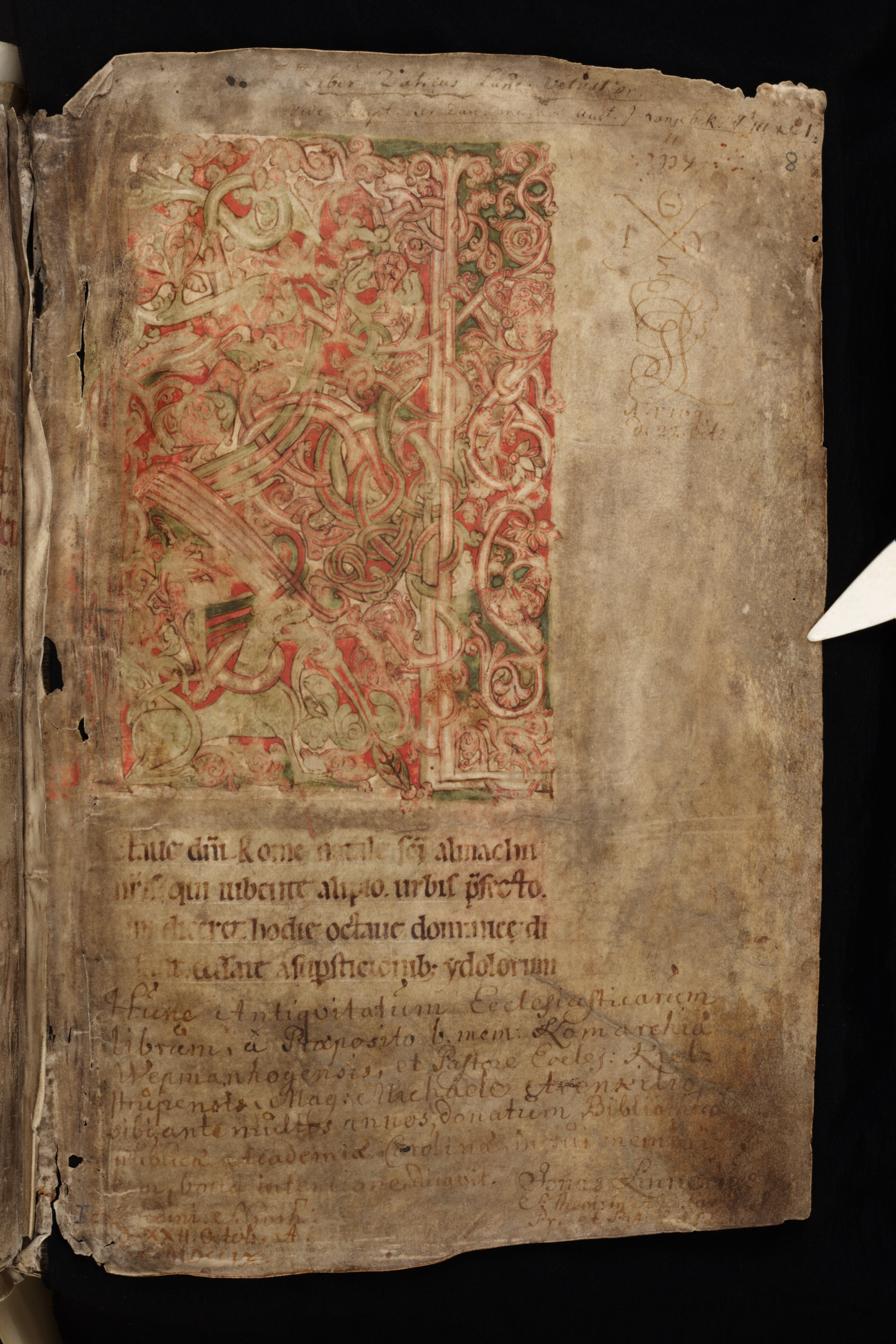
Folio 8 recto from Liber daticus vetustior, with a large, decorative KL-initial

Liber daticus vetustior (Latin: The earlier book of gifts; Lund, UB Mh 7) is a 12th-century illuminated manuscript probably made in Lund (then part of Denmark, today in Sweden). It was made to serve as the martyrology and obituary of the canons of Lund Cathedral.

== History ==
The book was written sometime between 1139 and 1146, and was designed as a combined martyrology and book of obituaries for deceased canons from Lund Cathedral. It is likely that it was made to be ready at the time of the consecration of the chancel of the cathedral in 1145. The book belonged to the cathedral until the early 15th century, but its whereabouts between then and 1709 are not known in detail. From 1709 it has been in the collections of the library of Lund University. It has been known by its Latin title Liber daticus vetustior since the 18th century, when it was first called so by Danish historian Jakob Langebek.

== Description ==
The martyrology is modeled after the Martyrology of Ado, composed in the 9th century, and updated with more recent saints such as Saint Olaf and Saint Rimbert. The list of saints also includes several bishops from Metz Cathedral in Lorraine, which has led researchers to assume that the text is a copy from a book from Metz.

In addition, the book also features a calendar that records the names of the cathedral's canons by their dates of death. A large number of these names have been copied from a somewhat earlier book from the cathedral, Necrologium Lundense, and new entries were made until c. 1410.

The book is bound in a half parchment binding from the 20th century (made in Lund) and measures 31.2 centimetres (12.3 in) by 21 centimetres (8.3 in). The text is decorated with twelve double initials (KL), one of which is much larger than the others. The initials were made at the same time as the oldest part of the text, in the 12th century. There are also 25 later decorative initials, made in the 13th century, as well as a few other decorative elements. The book is worn, showing traces of considerable use.

== Works cited ==
- Ekström, Per (1985). Lunds domkyrkas äldsta liturgiska böcker [The oldest liturgical books from Lund Cathedral]. Lund: Stundentlittaratur. ISBN 91-7874-004-5.
