= Guldholm Abbey =

Former Cistercian monastery

Coordinates: 54°34′24″N 9°33′20″E

Guldholm Abbey (German: Güldenholm) was a short-lived Cistercian monastery on the Langsee near Böklund, formerly in Denmark, now in Schleswig-Holstein in Germany. It was founded in 1191 and abandoned after less than twenty years; some of the community went on to establish Ryd Abbey.

== History ==
Guldholm was located on a peninsula of land in the Langsee lake (Danish: Langsø) near the Schlei (Danish: Slien) owned by Bishop Valdemar (1158-1236), an illegitimate son of King Canute V of Denmark, and Bishop of Schleswig from 1184 to 1191. When he received reports of immorality, drunkenness and disorderly conduct at St. Michael's Abbey in Schleswig, an ancient Benedictine double monastery, his solution was to remove the monks to a remote and less comfortable location, for which Guldholm seemed highly suitable. The monks were therefore apparently transferred there in 1191 to begin work on a new monastery which at the same time was put under the new and strict Cistercian reform, with its emphasis on manual labour.

Bishop Valdemar however was imprisoned in 1193 after a failed attempt to oust Duke Valdemar (later King Valdemar II) of Denmark.

Without his supervision the new foundation at Guldholm was abandoned after a few years. The remains of the community went north to the banks of the Flensborg Fjord near the hamlet of Ryd and began work on a new Cistercian monastery, Ryd Abbey ( Ryd Kloster) in 1210.
