= All Saints Abbey, Lund =

Former Benedictine monastery in Denmark

Coordinates: 55.70907°N 13.19735°E

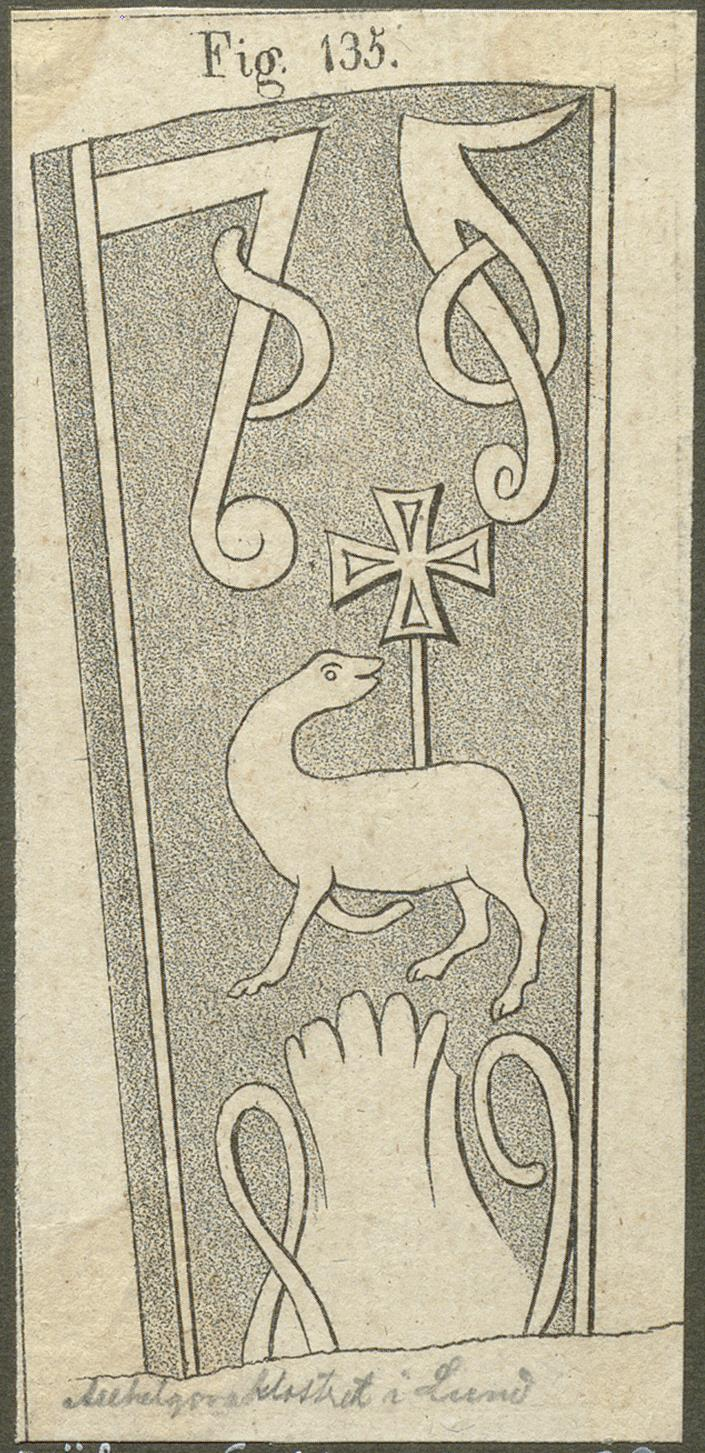

All Saints Abbey (Allhelgonaklostret) was a Benedictine monastery at Lund in Scania, Sweden. Located in what was once part of Denmark, it was one of earliest Danish religious houses. There are no remnants of the abbey remaining today.

== History ==
There is disagreement between scholars as to how long the Benedictines had a monastery at Lund. An important historic source of information about the abbey is the Necrologium Lundense, essentially an obituary book kept by monks. The data has been used by some scholars to indicate the dates of historic events including for the date of founding.

There was a monastic house in Lund perhaps as early as 1072 founded by Ricwald, Bishop of Lund (1072-1089) during the reign of King Sweyn Estridsson who imported German monks from Brauweiler Abbey near Cologne. Bishop Ricwalf is named as the founder of the abbey church sometime after 1072 in the 'Necrologium Lundense '. It may be that the church was constructed on one of the properties given to the Diocese of Lund by King Canute IV of Denmark in the first year of his reign. The small community of mostly German Benedictine monks at Lund apparently flourished. Abbot Hartwig from St. Pantaleon's Abbey in Cologne was named as the first abbot of the Benedictine house at Lund in 1123.

All Saints Abbey was constructed just outside the wall of Lund about 1138, the year Bishop Eskil was elevated to Archbishop of Lund by Pope Innocent II. The complex consisted of a three range set of buildings connected to the abbey church. Monks slept in the dormitory and ate in the refectory with large cellars located beneath. One wing was for the use of the lay brothers who did much of the work of the abbey. Another range contained the abbey's library and scriptorium, though not a single manuscript has survived.

In 1536, King Christian III of Denmark and the State Council (Riksråd) voted to accept the Lutheran Ordinances, thereby, making Denmark a Lutheran state. All religious houses and their income properties fell to the crown. Christian systematically closed the monasteries and superfluous churches most of which were torn down or put to other uses. Building materials from the demolition was used for construction of other structures throughout Scania. All Saints Abbey was demolished and most of its archive destroyed.

== Other Sources ==
- Blom, K. Arne; Wahlöö, Claes (1999) Medeltidens Lund (Lund : Wallin & Dalholm) ISBN 9197377007

== Related reading ==
- Grell, Ole Peter (1995) The Scandinavian Reformation. From evangelical movement to institutionalisation of reform (Cambridge University Press) ISBN 0-521-44162-5
