= Necrologium Lundense =

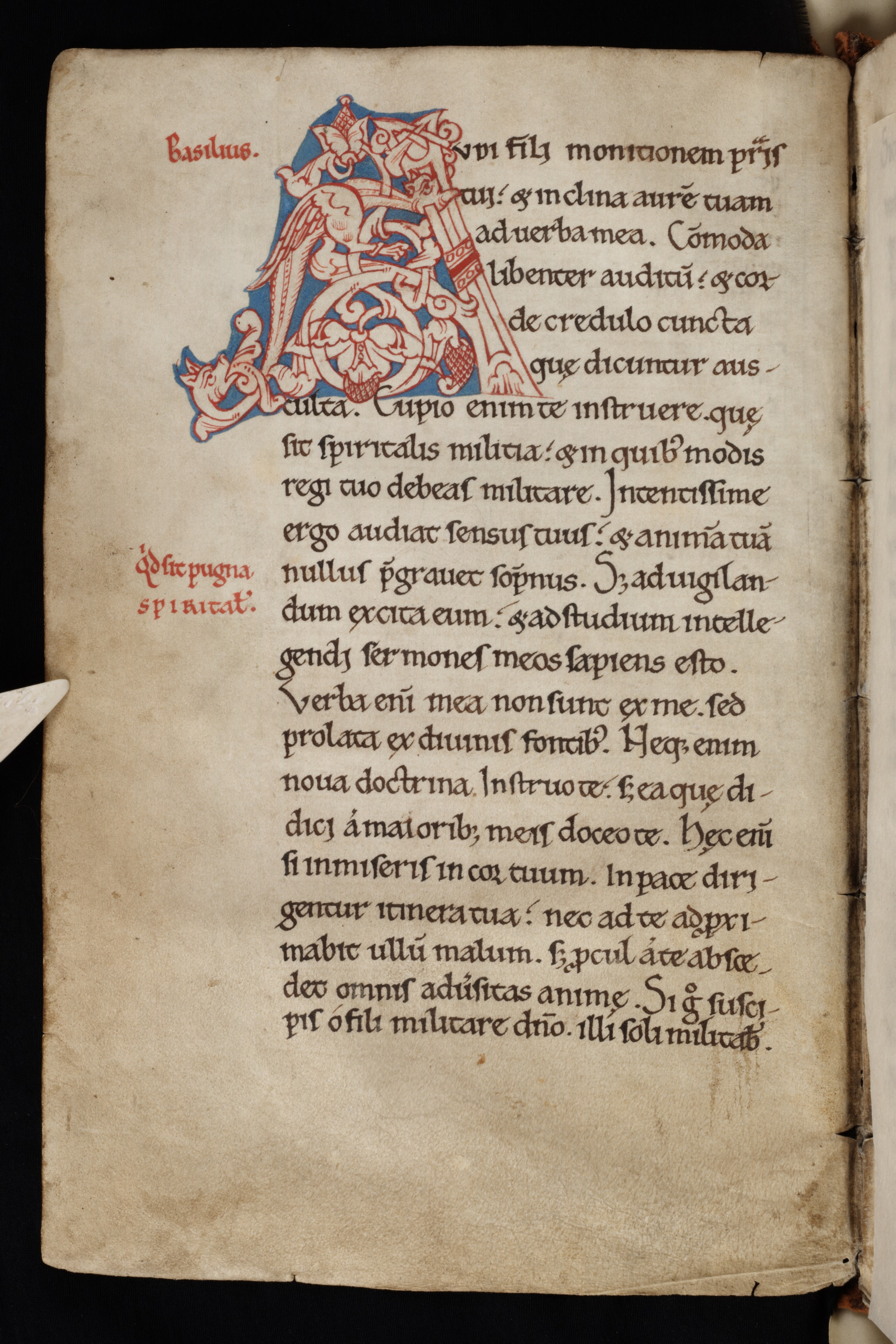
Folio 5 verso from Necrologium Lundense, one of two inhabited initials in the manuscript. It shows influences derived from Viking art.

Necrologium Lundense (Lund, UB Mh 6) is a 12th-century illuminated manuscript probably made in Lund (then part of Denmark, today part of Sweden) to serve as a book of rules for the canons of Lund Cathedral, with texts used by them in their daily life. Its oldest parts date from around 1123, and it is considered the oldest still intact manuscript written in Scandinavia. It is preserved in a late medieval binding and the text is partially adorned with decorated initials, including one which displays influences from Viking art. The book is today kept in the University Library of Lund University.

== History ==
Necrologium Lundense was written in Latin to serve the canons of Lund Cathedral in their daily life as a so-called capitulary book. The book consists of different parts which were written at slightly different times. The oldest part of the manuscript is also the main text: the Aachen Rule of canons. The rule regulates the lives of the canons of the cathedral, similarly to monastic rules such as the Rule of Saint Benedict. It was probably finished in time for the consecration of the crypt of the cathedral in 1123. Sometime later, perhaps in the 1130s, customary rules (Consuetudines canonice) for the canons of the cathedral were added; they are statutes for the community serving as a complement to the Rule of Aachen. The customary rules are furthermore complemented by a number of short texts in the same vein as the Rule of Aachen. The customary rules and the complementary texts appears to have been conceived as a manuscript of its own before being merged with the slightly older text. It may have been written by Hermann of Schleswig, a deposed bishop who ended his days as a canon, and possibly scribe, at Lund Cathedral. The customary rules from the Necrologium Lundense are the only preserved statutes for a religious community from the Early Middle Ages in Scandinavia. A third part of the book, though placed first in the manuscript, is a copy of a deed of gift from Canute IV of Denmark. Written in 1085, it details the donation of means for the construction of the cathedral as well as the establishment of the community of canons.

Apart from these texts regulating the lives of the canons, the book also contains a martyrology and a list of deceased canons from the cathedral and benefactors, listed according to the day on which they died. This is the second principal part of the book and sometimes referred to by its Latin description as Memoriale fratrum. Like the Rule of Aachen, it was finished by 1123 but is based on an earlier martyrology, now lost but probably written for the cathedral at the end of the 11th century. It also contains lists of kings, bishops and monasteries and religious communities which were connected to Lund, and has served as an important source for historians, etymologists and philologists.

The book is regarded as the oldest still intact manuscript written in Scandinavia. It has been known by its Latin name since the 18th century, when Danish historian Jakob Langebek first referred to the manuscript as Necrologium Lundense.

The canons of the cathedral used the book on a daily basis. Sections from it would be read when they gathered in their chapter house. A suitable part from the rules would be read aloud, and then the names of the martyrs, saints and deceased brethren relevant for that day would be announced as part of the preparations for the daily prayers. Necrologium Lundense was in use for a short period of time. The cathedral had been under construction since before the consecration of the crypt in 1123, but in 1145 the chancel was inaugurated and from then on the canons could start using it instead of the chapter house for their recitals. This coincided with a shift in liturgical practice, which meant that instead of the capitulary book, a new martyrology (Liber daticus vetustior) was used for their daily readings. For a while entries were still made in the Necrologium, but these were copied from the martyrology and eventually ceased altogether. It was owned by the chapter of the cathedral until 1671, when all its books were transferred to the newly established library of Lund University, where it has been kept since then.

== Description ==
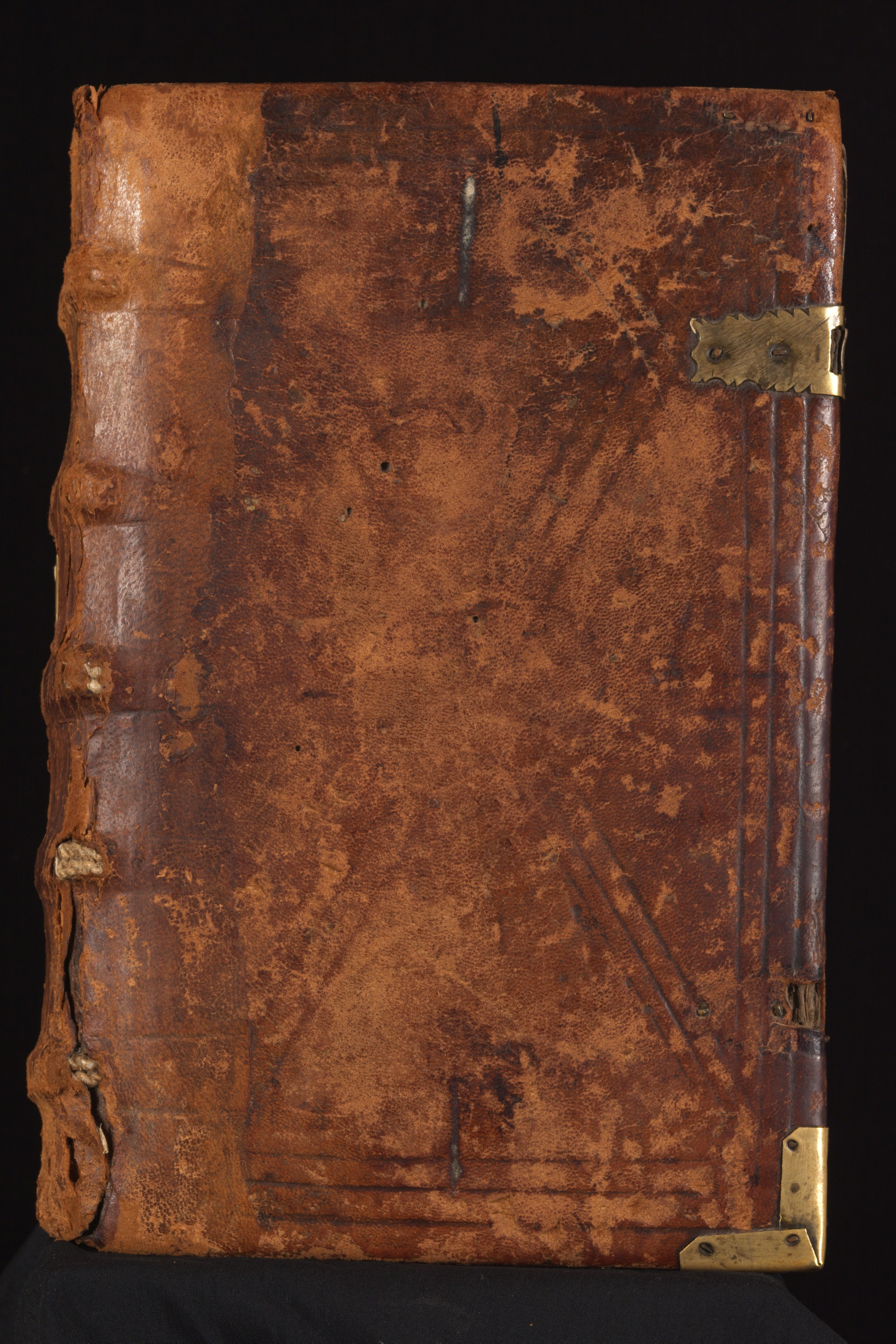
The book is bound in a late medieval brown goatskin binding

The size of the book is 24.8 centimetres (9.8 in) by 16.5 centimetres (6.5 in), and it contains 183 folios (leaves). It is bound in a later, probably 15th-century, medieval brown goatskin binding, decorated with blind tooling, partially preserved metal reinforcements at the corners and a clasp to keep the book tightly shut when closed (originally there were two). The binding was restored in the 19th century.

Many scribes have been involved in the production of the book, and there are added notes from as late as the 16th century. Three main types of scripts have been used: King Canute's deed of gift is written in protogothic documentary script (an early form of Gothic script), the Rule of Aachen is written in Carolingian minuscules and most of the rest of the book has been written with either minuscules with protogothic characteristics, or Scandinavian early protogothic script.

Some of the pages of the manuscript are decorated with inhabited or decorated initials. A large inhabited uncial initial A is on folio 5 verso, and on folio 58 verso there is another inhabited initial, a Q. The two initials appear to have been made by different artists; the A has several features typical for Scandinavian art, some derived from Viking art, while the Q is typically German Romanesque in style. There are also 15 smaller, decorated initials throughout the manuscript.

A facsimile edition was published in 1960.

== Works cited ==
- Andersen, Merete G. (2001). "The Consuetudines canonice of Lund". Scandia: Tidskrift för Historisk Forskning. 67 (1): 31–39.
- Ciardi, Anna Minara (2012). "Consuetudines Lundenses". In Borgehammar, Stephan; Mortensen, Lars Boje (eds.). Medieval Nordic Literature in Latin. A Website of Authors and Anonymous Works (ca 1100–1530).
- Ekström, Per (1985). Lunds domkyrkas äldsta liturgiska böcker [The oldest liturgical books from Lund Cathedral]. Lund: Stundentlittaratur. ISBN 91-7874-004-5.
- Weibull, Lauritz (1928). "Nekrologierna från Lund, Roskildekrönikan och Saxo. Grunddrag i Danmarks historia under det 12. århundradet" [The necrologies from Lund, the Chronicle of Roskilde and Saxo. Basic features of Danish history during the 12th century.]. Scandia: Tidskrift för Historisk Forskning (in Swedish). 1 (1): 84–112.
