= Valdemar of Denmark (bishop) =

Danish clergyman and statesman (1158–1236)

- Bishop of Schleswig; Prince-Archbishop of Bremen
- Church: Catholic Church
- See: Bremen, Schleswig

Orders
- Consecration: 1188

Personal details
- Born: Valdemar Knudsen; 1158
- Died: 18 July 1236 (aged 77–78) Cîteaux
- Denomination: Catholic
- Parents: Canute V of Denmark (mother unknown)

Valdemar Knudsen (also Waldemar, born in 1158; died 18 July 1236 in Cîteaux) was a Danish clergyman and statesman. Valdemar was Bishop of Schleswig from 1188 to 1208, officiated as Steward of the Duchy of Schleswig between 1184 and 1187, and served as Prince-Archbishop of Bremen from 1192 to 1194 and again between 1206 and 1217. He held the latter office on the grounds of the archdiocesan capitular election as archbishop elect and of the royal investiture with the princely regalia, but lacked the papal confirmation.

His mother, likely the wife of another man, gave birth to him as the posthumous illegitimate son of King Canute V of Denmark in early 1158. His father Canute V had been slain on 9 August 1157 by the co-regent Sweyn III. So Valdemar, like his half-brother, Saint Niels of Århus, claimed succession to the Danish throne.

Valdemar grew up at the court of his cousin, King Valdemar I of Denmark, the Great. Still in his youth his great ambitions and abilities crystallised, so that he was determined for the holy orders. Valdemar studied in Paris and Abbot Stephanus of the Abbey of Sainte-Geneviève noted that the Danish prince was mature and dignified like a bishop despite his youth, humble despite his noble descent, and spoke like a Frenchman despite his Danish tongue. After his studies his cousin promoted Valdemar's provision for the See in Sleswick (Danish: Slesvig, German: Schleswig) in 1179, although still too young to be consecrated bishop as successor of the late Frederick I.

== As bishop of Schleswig and steward of the Duchy of Schleswig ==
In memory of his late brother Niels he founded memorial endowments at the Abbeys of Ås (by 1192) and Vä (1182). From 1184 on Valdemar officiated as steward of the Duchy of Schleswig for Valdemar the Great's minor son Duke Valdemar (later King Valdemar II of Denmark). In 1187 King Canute VI Valdemarsen endowed the diocese of Schleswig with far reaching privileges. At Christmas 1187 Duke Valdemar took over the Duchy of Schleswig and soon later Valdemar Knudsen was consecrated bishop probably in the Cathedral of St. Peter's. After consecration in 1188 Bishop Valdemar levied the tithe, supported by his metropolitan Absalon, since before the tithes had hardly ever been levied in Danish dioceses.

In 1187 and 1188 Hartwig of Uthlede, Prince-Archbishop of Bremen, and his troops invaded the trans-Elbian free peasants republic of Ditmarsh, ecclesiastically belonging to the Archdiocese of Bremen, in order to subject Ditmarsh also to his secular princely overlordship. The free peasants promised to pay him dues, only to mock about him, once he and his soldiers had left. The Ditmarsians gained support by steward Valdemar, so that Hartwig could not dare another costly invasion. Bishop Valdemar and Duke Valdemar came into conflict with each other on Ditmarsh. Duke Valdemar curtailed diocesan estates of Schleswig and personal possessions of Bishop Valdemar. Cardinal legate Cinthius of San Lorenzo in Luscina failed to mediate in this dispute.

Bishop Valdemar learned about the abbot, monks, and nuns at the Benedictine Abbey of St. Michael's in the town of Schleswig, who had fallen into immoral behavior and had earned a reputation for drunkenness. Valdemar decided that the best way to reform the monks was to move them from the temptations in town, and establish a new convent, built in 1191, far enough away that the monks wouldn't cause more trouble. In 1192 the monks apparently were moved unwillingly to Güldenholm to begin the work on a new monastery. At some point, Güldenholm Abbey became Cistercian, with the monks working in the fields to earn their daily bread and meat. By 1193 Valdemar endowed Løgum Abbey with the tithe of Bjolderup (near Tinglev).

In 1190 Emperor Henry VI revoked Hartwig's princely regalia empowering his rule in the Prince-Archbishopric of Bremen, for his partisanship with the House of Welf. The Pope, however, did not depose Hartwig as archbishop, who fled first with the Guelphs to England and then to Lüneburg. In 1192 Duke Valdemar, then 22 years old, seriously disagreed about Bishop Valdemar's way of leading the diocese. In the same year the Bremian Chapter didn't wait any longer for a papal dismissal of Hartwig and unauthorisedly elected Valdemar as its new Prince-Archbishop, encouraged by Henry VI. Valdemar welcomed his election, hoping his new position could be helpful in his dispute with Duke Valdemar and his elder brother Canute VI. Before entering the Prince-Archbishopric he won the support of Ditmarsh. Moreover, the bishop conspired with Adolphus III of Holstein, perhaps also with his brothers-in-law Jaromar I of Rugia and Casimir II of Pomerania, and with Canute I of Sweden and Sverre of Norway. The Bremian mint in the city of Bremen issued coins showing Valdemar's portrait.

== Valdemar as Bremen's archbishop elect in Danish captivity (1193–1206) ==
Duke Valdemar realised the threat Prince-Archbishop Valdemar presented. In 1192 he invited the Prince-Archbishop to meet him in Åbenrå. Then the bishop fled to Swedish Norway to avoid an arrest. The following year he organised – supported by the Hohenstaufens – a fleet of 35 ships manned with Norwegian or Swedish mercenaries and harried the coasts of Denmark with an eye to overthrowing King Canute VI, claiming the Danish throne for himself, while Adolphus III crossed the Eider invading the duchy of Schleswig. On 8 July 1192 Canute VI captured Bishop Valdemar, before he could ever enter the Prince-Archbishopric of Bremen.

Despite the interventions by Pope Celestine III Bishop Valdemar stayed in captivity in Nordborg (1193–1198) and then in the tower at Søborg Castle on Zealand until 1206. So he in effect couldn't take the Bremian See. After pope (1198) and king (1202) had been replaced by their successors, Bishop Valdemar was released upon the initiative, launched in 1203, of the Danish Queen Dagmar and Pope Innocent III, after swearing never to interfere again in Danish affairs. Bishop Valdemar left Søborg for Rome. Duke Valdemar, meanwhile King Valdemar II, in return asked the pope the favour to confirm Nicholas as new bishop of Schleswig. Innocent III, however, refused, referencing to canon law precepts. King Valdemar II inflicted a series of lawsuits at the papal court against Bishop Valdemar, blaming him for apostasy, alienation of church estates, immorality, perjury and high treason against Denmark. But the bishop knew to successfully defend himself.

== Papally deposed as archbishop, but royally invested with princely regalia ==
When in 1207 Hartwig of Uthlede died, a majority of Bremian Capitulars – overlooking the votes of the absent constitutionally provided three representatives of the Hamburg Concathedral chapter – again elected Valdemar. A minority, led by Bremen's cathedral capitular provost Burchard of Stumpenhusen, who had opposed this election, fled to Hamburg, then under Danish occupation.

Valdemar, still asserting himself as Prince-Archbishop, could not hinder Iso of Wölpe, Prince-Bishop of Verden, to capture the Bremian castle in Ottersberg. Hamburg and the neighbouring County of Holstein, both part of the archdiocesan but not of the prince-archiepiscopal territory, were subject to Danish occupation under Valdemar II, since in 1202 he had confederated himself with Otto IV, rival king against the German King Philip. Philip recognised bishop Valdemar as the legitimate Prince-Archbishop of Bremen, investing him with the princely regalia, thus making the Prince-Archbishopric his ally against Valdemar II.

Valdemar II and the fled capitulars protested to Pope Innocent III, who first wanted to research the case. When bishop Valdemar left Rome for Bremen against Innocent's order to wait his decision, he banned Valdemar by an anathema and in 1208 finally dismissed him too as bishop of Schleswig. The fled capitulars and King Valdemar II of Denmark then gained the Hamburg chapter to elect Burchard as anti-archbishop in early 1208. Lacking papal and imperial support King Valdemar II himself, usurping imperial power, invested him as Prince-Archbishop Burchard I with the regalia, however, only accepted in the North Elbian archdiocesan territory.

Prince-Archbishop Valdemar confederated with the free peasants of Stedingen, a region within the Prince-Archbishopric whose inhabitants rejected to be subjected as serfs, sparing them from socage. Earlier Burchard, then still provost of the Bremian Chapter, had failed to subject the free peasants by military means. This weakness provoked his mother's cousin Count Maurice I of the neighbouring Oldenburg to subject them and annex Stedingen – also in vain. The free peasants of Stedingen agreed to provide Prince-Archbishop Valdemar with mercenaries, who in return retained any further attack on their freedom.

In 1208 Burchard invaded with Danish troops the prince-archiepiscopal territory south of the Elbe and conquered Stade. In August Prince-Archbishop Valdemar reconquered the city only to lose it soon after again to Valdemar II, who now built a bridge over the Elbe and fortified a forward post in Harburg upon Elbe.

In Bremen Prince-Archbishop Valdemar had been warmly welcomed and nobody cared about the anathema. After Philip's assassination in June 1208, Prince-Archbishop Valdemar as well as the burghers and the city of Bremen joined the party of the former rival king Otto IV, whom Innocent III crowned Emperor in 1209. Otto IV persuaded Valdemar II to withdraw into the north of the Elbe and urged anti-archbishop Burchard to resign. Bremen's cathedral chapter had fallen out with Valdemar and reconciled with Hamburg's concathedral chapter to elect a new archbishop, this time searching the papal consent. This made Valdemar search for the papal recognition as archbishop, in 1210 he pilgrimaged to Rome and craved Innocent's forgiving, and he pardoned him and lifted his ban against Valdemar. Innocent entitled Valdemar to serve as metropolitan of Bremen ecclesiastical province and archbishop and to ordain priests. Thus recognised by pope and emperor Valdemar departed for Bremen.

In November 1210 Innocent III fell out with Otto IV, since the emperor claimed papal territory as imperial fiefs and demanded King Frederick Roger of Sicily to render the newly crowned Otto IV homage as vassal for the Duchy of Apulia and Calabria, two imperial fiefs Fredrick Roger held in personal union. Bremen's capitular dean as well as its suffragans Albert of Bexhövede, Bishop of Livonia, and Prince-Bishop Dietrich I of Lübeck, then proposed Burchard's uncle Count Gerhard I of Oldenburg-Wildeshausen, already Prince-Bishop of Osnabrück, for Bremen. In late 1210 Innocent III approved their proposal and replaced Valdemar, being a Guelphic partisan, as archbishop by Gerhard I, before Valdemar had returned to Bremen.

However, in 1211 Duke Bernard III of the younger Duchy of Saxony escorted his brother-in-law Valdemar, the recently papally recognised, but newly papally deposed archbishop, into the city of Bremen, de facto regaining the See and enjoying the support of Otto IV. The Bremians rejected Gerhard's claim and favoured Valdemar. Innocent inflicted several bans on Valdemar for his inobedience. Bernard fought the forces of Prince-Bishop Gerhard I, aiming at taking over the Bremian see, while Valdemar alienated Bremian ecclesiastical estates to finance Bernard's warfare. As a reaction Valdemar II, now allied with Innocent against Otto IV, recaptured Stade, while in 1213 Otto's elder brother Henry V, conquered it for Prince-Archbishop Valdemar. In 1215 Henry repelled another Danish attack on Stade.

From 1212 to 1214 the mercenaries from Stedingen destroyed the castles at Beverstedt, Stotel (a part of today's Loxstedt), Riensberg and Seehausen (both a part of today's city of Bremen), all held by partisans of Valdemar's rival archbishop Gerhard I, whom the Stedingers clearly identified as a proponent of their subjection to serfdom. The Oldenburgers successfully defended the Burghagen Castle in Hagen im Bremischen against the Stedingers and Gerhard I mobilised the Count Henry I of Hoya to help, who inflicted the first defeat on the Stedingers in 1213.

But soon Otto IV's position was challenged, losing his uncle's, John Lackland, financial support after the English defeat in the Battle of Bouvines (1214), by Frederick II (Roger), in 1215 replacing Otto as accepted Emperor. Nevertheless, in the same year Henry V, his younger brother Otto IV, Margrave Albert II of Brandenburg, and Prince-Archbishop Valdemar and their troops, among them mercenaries from Stedingen, conquered Hamburg. In the winter of 1216 Valdemar II and his Danish troops, unable to take the city of Stade, ravaged the County of Stade and reconquered Hamburg.

In 1216 the mercenaries of Stedingen swung over to the party of Gerhard I, who promised to respect their freedom, and attacked the city of Bremen, loyal to Valdemar. Henry V rescued the city with his troops. In 1217 the city of Bremen deserted Valdemar's party. Now Henry V, Otto IV and their troops ravaged the Prince-Archbishopric (so-called Valdemarian Turmoils, 1217–1218). In 1218 Gerhard I and Valdemar II allied to expel Henry and Otto from the Prince-Archbishopric. Gerhard's troops approached the fortress of Vörde disguised as sick, lining up for a treatment by the faith healer and farmer Otbert. Once arrived they overthrew Henry's soldiers in the fortress. After the deaths of Otto in 1218 and Gerhard I in 1219, Henry V reached an agreement with the new Prince-Archbishop Gerhard II, to maintain the County of Stade as prince-archiepiscopal vassal.

== Valdemar as a monk ==
In 1217 Valdemar fled the Prince-Archbishopric towards his nephew Albert I, Duke of Saxony. Later Valdemar entered the Saxon Cistercian Loccum Abbey. The abbot thought he was sick unto death, dispended him for the time being from the bans and received him as a monk by 1219. After Valdemar had recovered, however, he had to do penance and went to Rome in 1220, where Pope Honorius III forgave him, lifted the anathema again, and reaccepted him in the Church's bosom, but forbade him to officiate as priest and sent him to the Cîteaux Abbey. The pope left it up to the abbots of the Cîteaux and Morimond Abbeys to determine Valdemar's future residence. Valdemar was sent to Loccum, as he wished for, living a decent monastic life.

After in the night between 6 and 7 May 1223 Henry I, Count of Schwerin had kidnapped King Valdemar II and his son Valdemar the Young, in order to blackmail the Danish withdrawal from Holstein, Valdemar Knudsen saw again his chance to gain the Danish throne. Valdemar escaped the Loccum Abbey and gathered a crowd of supporters and invaded Danish-occupied Holstein in 1224, but was repelled by the Danish military commander Albert II, Count of Weimar-Orlamünde. Valdemar Knudsen did not recover, he was overlooked as participant in the Battle of Bornhöved (1227), where the victorious Low Saxon alliance of princes stopped the then Danish expansionism. In 1232 Valdemar moved into Cîteaux Abbey again, where he died on 18 July 1236. He was buried at the Abbey.

== Notes ==
Valdemar of Denmark House of Estridsen Born: early 1158 Died: 18 July 1236 in Cîteaux
Catholic Church titles
Preceded by Frederick I	Bishop of Schleswig; 1188–1208; Already in 1179 provided as bishop before coming of canonical age; in Danish captivity from 1193 to 1206.	Succeeded by Nicholas I
Government offices
Preceded by Valdemar I as King of Denmark	Steward of the Duchy of Schleswig; 1182–1187	Succeeded by Valdemar II as Duke of Schleswig
Regnal titles
Catholic Church titles
Vacant Title last held by Hartwig II of Uthlede; 1185–1190; 1190–1192 rule by the Chapter	Prince-Archbishop of Bremen; 1192–1194 and again 1207–1217; Archbishop elect in 1192 and 1207, in Danish captivity (1193–1206), papally recognised mid-1210, late 1210 papally deposed, 1207–1213 invested as prince by the incumbent monarch of the Empire; With: Hartwig II (1194–1207 de facto reascended as rival, despite his dismissal by chapter and king in 1190); Burchard of Stumpenhusen (1208–1210 as Danish-invested rivalling archbishop in Hamburg and Holstein); Gerhard I (1210–1219 as papally appointed rivalling archbishop and since 1213 imperially invested as prince)	Succeeded by Gerhard I
