= Nicholas I (bishop of Schleswig) =

Danish bishop (died 1233)

- Bishop of Schleswig
- Church: Roman Catholic Church
- Archdiocese: Lund
- See: Diocese of Schleswig
- In office: 1209–1233
- Predecessor: Valdemar Knudsen
- Successor: Tuco

Personal details
- Born: unknown
- Died: 1233

Nicholas I (Latin: Nicolaus, Danish: Niels, German: Nikolaus) (died 1233) was Bishop of Schleswig between 1209 and 1233. Since 1192 he de facto, though not consecrated, officiated during the flight and following royal captivity of his predecessor Bishop Valdemar (1193–1206).

After Valdemar's papal deposition in 1208 Nicholas was finally consecrated as bishop in 1209. Since 1214 Nicholas also served as Chancellor of Denmark (i.e. about prime minister) until his death.

== Life ==
He was originally a canon at Lund Cathedral obviously highly esteemed by Archbishop Absalon.

After Bishop Valdemar Knudsen, also Prince-Archbishop elect of Bremen, son of the murdered King Canute V of Denmark and therefore claiming the Danish throne, had attempted to overthrow King Canute VI of Denmark, the latter captured Bishop Valdemar in 1193, who stayed in royal captivity until 1206. Canute VI then unilaterally appointed Nicholas as bishop of Schleswig, however Pope Celestine III refused to depose the imprisoned Valdemar.

In 1201 Nicholas participated - either as fellow traveller or even as leader - in a delegation to France, where in March they met the repudiated Ingeborg of Denmark, Queen consort of France during a council in Soissons, where the king, however only temporary, declared he readmitted her. Ingeborg gave him relics as a gift to bring to Denmark. A delegation sent to the new Pope Innocent III in order to get Nicholas' papal confirmation as bishop, returned with empty hands.

After in 1206 - at the instigation of Innocent III and Queen consort Dagmar of Bohemia - the new King Valdemar II had released his cousin Bishop Valdemar, the king in return asked the pope the favour to confirm Nicholas as bishop. Innocent III, however, refused again referencing to canon law precepts.

In the same year Nicholas followed King Valdemar II in his campaign to conquer the Estonian island Øsel (Saaremaa). From there, accompanied by Lund's Archbishop Anders Sunesen, Nicholas went to Riga and stayed there until 1207.

However, when Bishop Valdemar de facto ascended the Bremen see in 1208, against the papal command to await his papal confirmation, Innocent III deposed Bishop Valdemar as bishop of Schleswig and Nicholas was consecrated as new bishop of Schleswig in the following year. From the same year onwards he spruced up the prior reprobate Guldholm Abbey, which had become Cistercian as part of the reform. Nicholas wielded his episcopal office with diligence, also shown by his questions to Rome, which the pope replied (1213).

King Valdemar II had much confidence to Bishop Nicholas and made him Chancellor of Denmark (i.e. prime minister) in 1214, succeeding the late Chancellor Peder Sunesen, Bishop of Roskilde, brother of Archbishop Anders Sunesen. In 1219 Nicholas accompanied King Valdemar in another crusade in Estonia. Bishop Nicholas was probably among the Danish bishops, who have been captured in the Battle of Bornhöved in 1227. On his later years almost nothing is known. He kept the chancellorship until his death in 1233.

== Notes ==
Nicholas I Born: unknown Died: 1233
Catholic Church titles
Preceded by Valdemar of Denmark	Bishop of Schleswig; 1209–1233 (de facto, though not consecrated, already officiating during Valdemar's royal captivity since 1193.)	Succeeded by Tuco, Bishop of Schleswig
Political offices
Preceded by Peder Sunesen	Chancellor of Denmark; 1214–1233	Succeeded by Niels Stigsen
