= Gottschalk von Ahlefeldt =

Catholic Bishop of Schleswig

The Most Reverend Gottschalk von Ahlefeldt
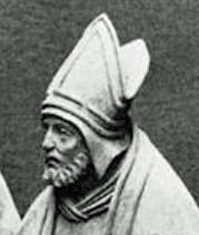
- Allegedly Gottschalk von Ahlefeldt (1475–1541) on the relief in the Bordesholm altarpiece.
- Church: Catholic Church
- Diocese: Schleswig
- Appointed: 21 May 1507
- Term ended: 25 January 1541
- Predecessor: Detlev von Pogwisch
- Successor: Tilemann von Hussen

Personal details
- Born: c. 1475
- Died: 25 January 1541 (aged approximately 65/66)
- Buried: Schleswig Cathedral
- Education: University of Rostock; University of Bologna
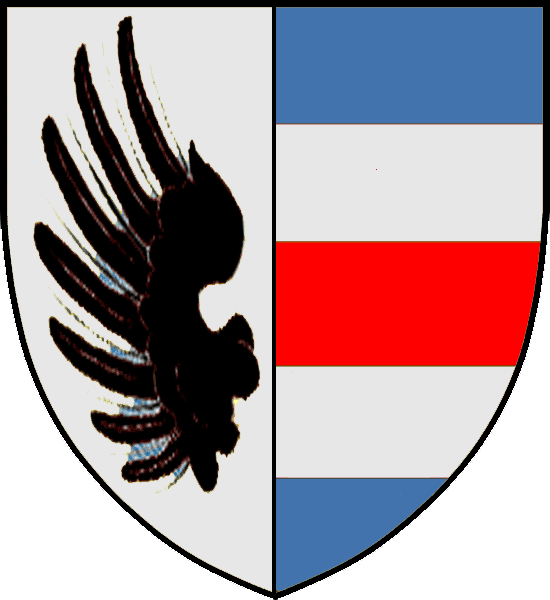
- Coat of arms

Gottschalk (Gosche) von Ahlefeldt (c. 1475 – 25 January 1541 in Bollingstedt) was the last Catholic Bishop of Schleswig.

== Life ==
Gottschalk von Ahlefeldt was born in 1475, the son of Claus von Ahlefeldt. At the age of 14, he was enrolled at the University of Rostock. There he studied canon law and became a canon and Thesaurarius in 1497. He then went to Italy to continue his studies and stayed in Rome for some time. In 1498 Gottschalk enrolled at the University of Bologna and returned to Schleswig in 1501 as a doctor of canon law.

Due to his education in Bologna and his descent from the Ahlefeldt family, he was employed as chancellor at the court of Duke Frederick I. In 1506, Gottschalk von Ahlefeldt took over the cathedral provostship at Schleswig Cathedral and became bishop on 21 May 1507, succeeding Detlev von Pogwisch elected in Schleswig. In him one suspects "the intellectual mind behind the works of Hans Brüggemann".

The Reformation began during his term. Since he did not oppose the Reformation, he remained in possession of the episcopal estates until his death on his Bollingstedt estate on 25 January 1541. Tilemann von Hussen was appointed the first evangelical bishop of Schleswig after Johannes Bugenhagen had rejected this office.

Gottschalk Ahlefeldt is buried in Schleswig Cathedral.

== Literature ==
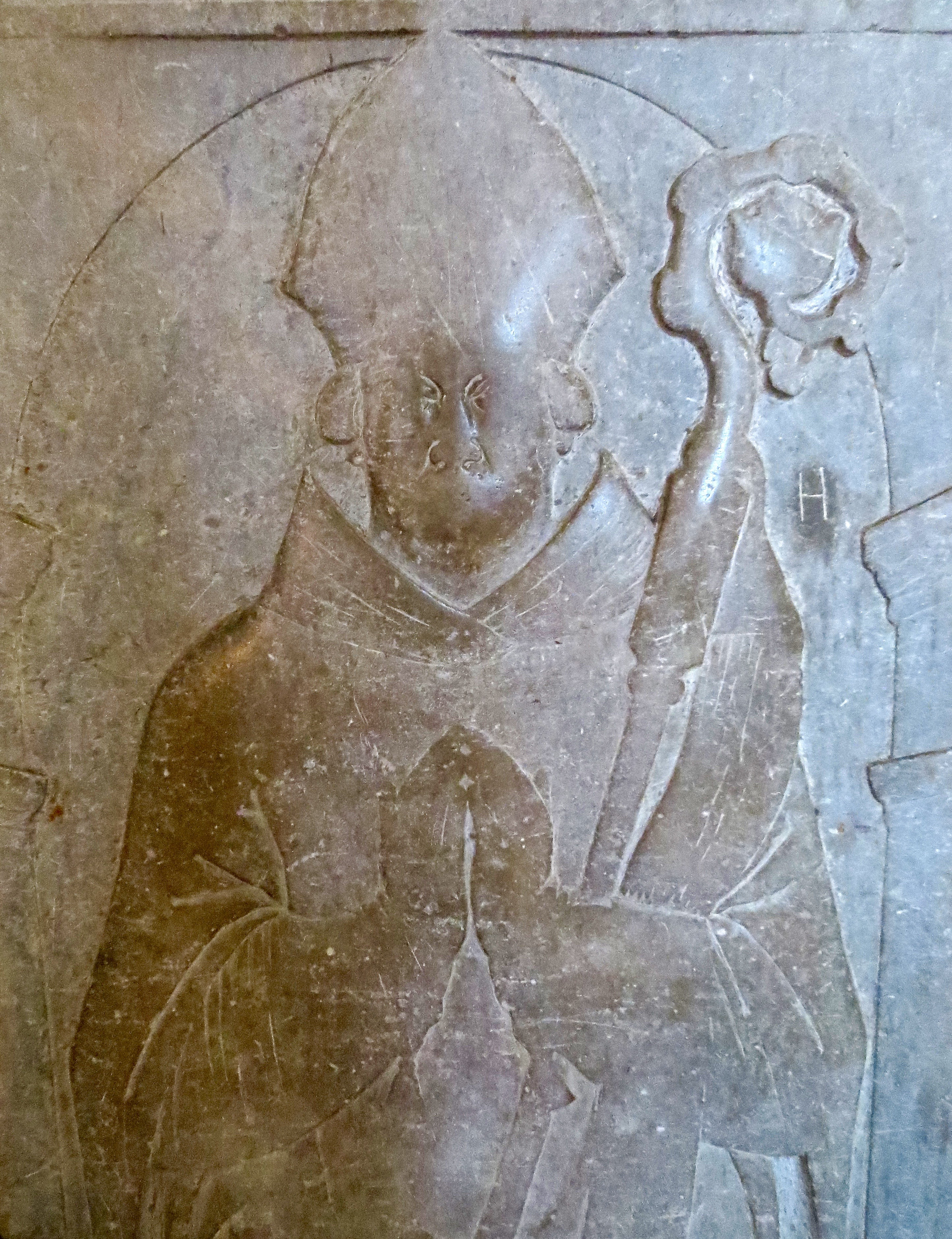
- Relief of Ahlefteldt from tombstone in Schleswig Cathedral
  Ernst Friedrich Mooyer: Zur Chronologie schleswigscher Bischöfe. In: Jahrbücher für die Landeskunde der Herzogthümer Schleswig. Band 2 (1859), S. 15 ff. (Digitalisat in der Google-Buchsuche).
- Louis von Ahlefeldt, Wulf August von Rumohr Drüllt: Die Schleswig-Holsteinische Ritterschaft. Ein Beitrag zur Adelsgeschichte Deutschlands und Dänemarks. Heft 1: Die Familie von Ahlefeldt. Heiberg, Schleswig 1869, S. 11 (Digitalisat).
- Wilhelm Jensen (1953). "Ahlefeldt, Gottschalk von". Neue Deutsche Biographie (in German). Vol. 1. Berlin: Duncker & Humblot. p. 109. (full text online).
- Leopold von Zedlitz-Neukirch: Neues preussisches Adels-Lexicon oder genealogische und diplomatische Nachrichten. Band 1 (1836), S. 87.
- Friedrich Wilhelm Bautz: von Ahlefeldt, Gottschalk. In: Biographisch-Bibliographisches Kirchenlexikon (BBKL). Band 1, Bautz, Hamm 1975. 2.,
- unveränderte Auflage Hamm 1990, ISBN 3-88309-013-1, Sp. 66.

Preceded by Detlev von Pogwisch	Bishop of Schleswig; 1507–1541	Succeeded by Tilemann von Hussen
