= Hermann of Schleswig =

Medieval Danish cleric

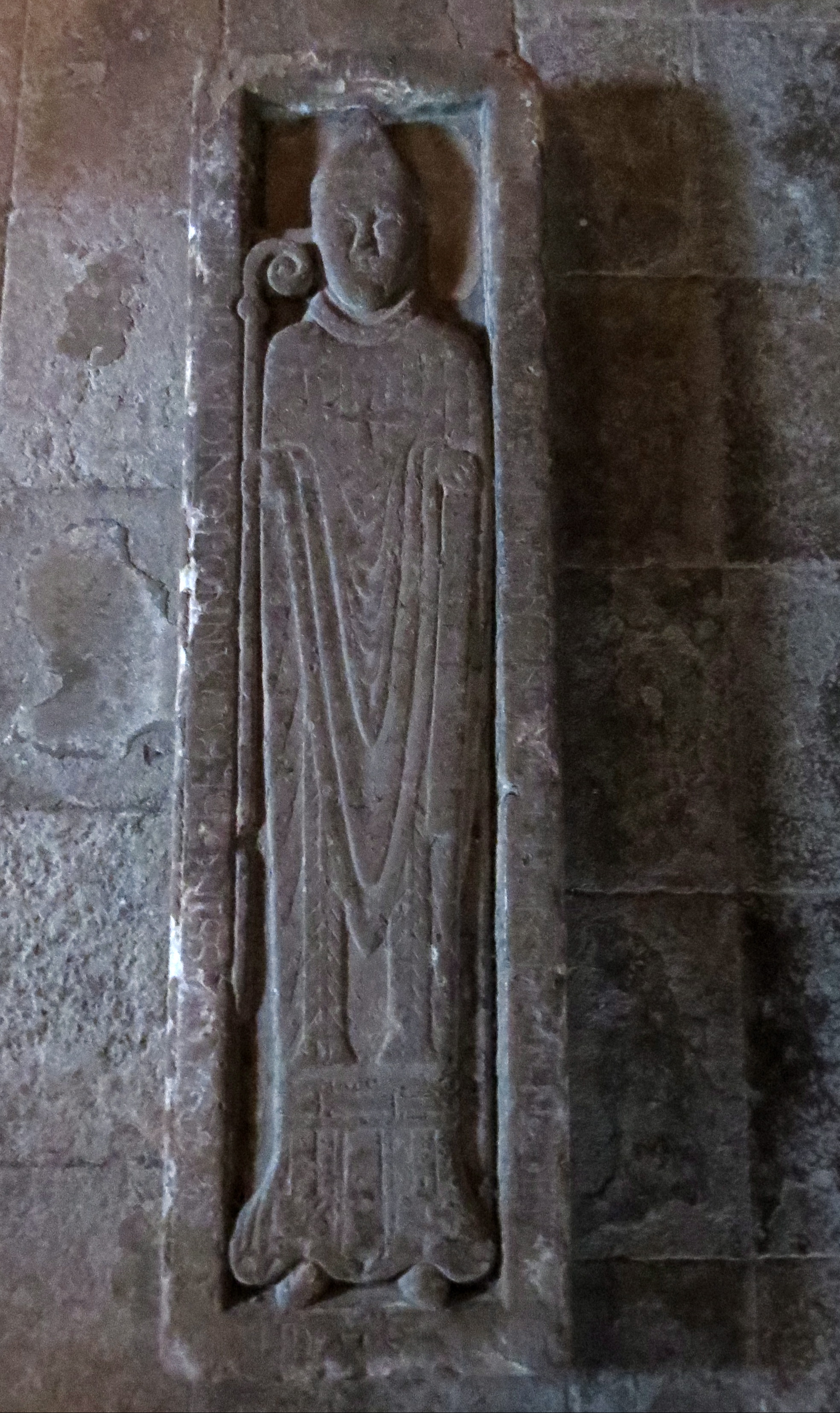
Grave of Hermann of Schleswig in Lund Cathedral

Hermann of Schleswig (died 16 January 1151), also known as Hermann of Klosterrath, was a titular bishop of Schleswig, canon and possibly also scribe at Lund Cathedral. He entered the monastery of Rolduc at an early age, and after failing to become abbot of the monastery eventually left for Lund (then part of Denmark, today in Sweden). He provided several services to the bishops of Lund and was appointed to become bishop of Schleswig, but the local clergy had elected Occo of Schleswig in 1137 as their bishop and refused to accept Hermann. He therefore remained in Lund, where he is buried in the crypt of Lund Cathedral.

== Monastic career ==
Hermann was the son of the duke of Saffenburg, Emmerik or Embrico, and his wife Adeleida. Hermann's date and place of birth are unknown, but as a young man (c. 1107) he entered the monastery of Rolduc (today in the south-eastern Netherlands), also known in German as Klosterrath. He later tried but failed to get elected as abbot of the monastery on two occasions (1124 and 1128) despite having the support of the younger monks, and soon thereafter left Rolduc. Supported by Archbishop Frederick of Cologne, he obtained the leadership of a community of canons at Dünewald in the vicinity of Cologne, but wasn't welcomed by the community and soon left again. He then moved to Lund in Denmark. He probably arrived in Denmark around 1130, and entered the service of Archbishop Asser of Lund. Upon his arrival in Denmark, Hermann probably introduced the cathedral chapter to the customary rules (statutes for the community of canons) recently formulated at Marbach Abbey and subsequently adopted by the chapter of Lund Cathedral.

In 1133, Asser (or Ascer) received a letter from the pope asking him to submit himself to the authority of the archdiocese of Hamburg-Bremen. Hermann was entrusted with the task of traveling to Rome to convince the pope to change his mind, which he succeeded in doing; the Diocese of Lund was confirmed as an archdiocese for the Nordic countries. It is also possible that Hermann worked as a scribe at the scriptorium of Lund Cathedral in the 1130s, penning parts of the illuminated manuscript Necrologium Lundense as well as other liturgical texts. Hermann also had close ties to Eskil, the nephew of Asser, and probably served as his chaplain during Eskil's time as bishop of Roskilde. On the death of Asser, Eskil succeeded him as archbishop in 1137, and Hermann was instrumental in obtaining a pallium for him in connection with the appointment. Hermann is also mentioned as serving as chaplain for King Eric III of Denmark.

== Schleswig dispute ==
Following Eskil's appointment as archbishop, subsequent changes among the heads of the Danish dioceses meant that the position of bishop of Schleswig also became vacant. Perhaps as a reward for his services to the archdiocese of Lund, Hermann was appointed. The local clergy of Schleswig had however in 1137 independently elected Occo of Schleswig as their bishop and refused to accept Hermann. Despite having the support of the king, Hermann had no choice but to return to Lund and would remain there for the rest of his life, serving as a canon at the cathedral. In 1139 he participated in a synod in Lund as titular bishop of Schleswig but by 1145 he had resigned his claims to the diocese. His tombstone in the crypt of Lund Cathedral nevertheless depicts him in the full dress of a bishop, with alb, dalmatic and chasuble. An inscription around the edge of the stone identifies him as bishop of Schleswig.

== Works cited ==
- Andersen, Merete G. (2001). "The Consuetudines canonice of Lund". Scandia: Tidskrift för Historisk Forskning. 67 (1): 31–39.
- Bricka, Carl Frederik, ed. (1893). Dansk biografisk lexikon (in Danish). Vol. 7. Copenhagen: Gyldendalske Boghandels Forlag (F. Hegel & Søn). OCLC 312939670.
- Nyberg, Tore (2018) [2000]. "Chapter Ten. The great period: civil war 2. Augustinian monasticism". Monasticism in North-Western Europe, 800–1200. Routledge. ISBN 978-1-315-19454-7.
- Rydbeck, Otto (1946). "Lunds domkyrka, byggnadens och dess inventariers historia enligt de nyaste forskningsresultaten" [Lund Cathedral, the history of the building and its furnishings according to the latest research]. In Newman, Ernst (ed.). Lunds domkyrkas historia 1145–1945 [History of Lund Cathedral 1145–1945] (in Swedish). Stockholm: Svenska kyrkans diakonistyrelses bokförlag.
- Wrangel, Ewert (1915). Konstverk i Lunds domkyrka [Art in Lund Cathedral] (in Swedish). Lund: C. W. K. Gleerup.
