= Occo of Schleswig =

Occo
- Bishop of Schleswig
- Church: Roman Catholic Church
- Archdiocese: Lund
- See: Diocese of Schleswig
- In office: 1141–1145, and again 1161–1167
- Predecessor: Hermann, and Esbern
- Successor: Esbern, and Frederick I

Personal details
- Born: unknown
- Died: 1167

Occo of Schleswig (also Aage, Aagge, Ogge) was the bishop of the Diocese of Schleswig between 1141 and 1145 and again from 1161 to 1167.

The chapter of Schleswig Cathedral elected Occo bishop in 1138, after Bishop Rike had been elected the new bishop of Roskilde. However, Eric III Lamb imposed his chaplain Hermann, who was born in the Holy Roman Empire. So Occo was hindered to ascend the see. The city of Schleswig and the diocesan clergy preferred the Bishop elect Occo and after unrest among the townsfolk Hermann resigned, and Occo ascended. Eric Lamb provided for Hermann with another position.

Occo sided – unlike his Archbishop Eskil of Lund – with Olaf Haraldsen who aimed at dethroning his cousin Eric Lamb, but failed. Occo then had to leave and went into French exile. Eskil then consecrated Esbern as new bishop of Schleswig. The royal steward (or stadholder) for Schleswig, Nicolaus, ravaged Esberns's possessions and his residence (Old Gottorp). So Esbern's relatives protected him and killed Nicolaus. Fearing the royal revenge Esbern fled to Saxony, where he died in 1161.

King Valdemar I the Great then reappointed Occo as bishop. This made Eskil inflicting the ban on Occo, but due to internal quarrels in the church the bishop of Schleswig managed to stay in office until his death. Starting in 1161 Occo built a new Gottorp Castle, replacing the destroyed one, however, on another site.

== Notes ==
Occo of Schleswig Died: 1167
Catholic Church titles
Preceded by Hermann	Bishop of Schleswig; 1141–1145	Succeeded by Esbern
Preceded by Esbern	Bishop of Schleswig; 1161–1167	Succeeded by Frederick I
