= Langsee (Schleswig) =

Lake in Schleswig-Holstein, Germany

- Langsø(en)
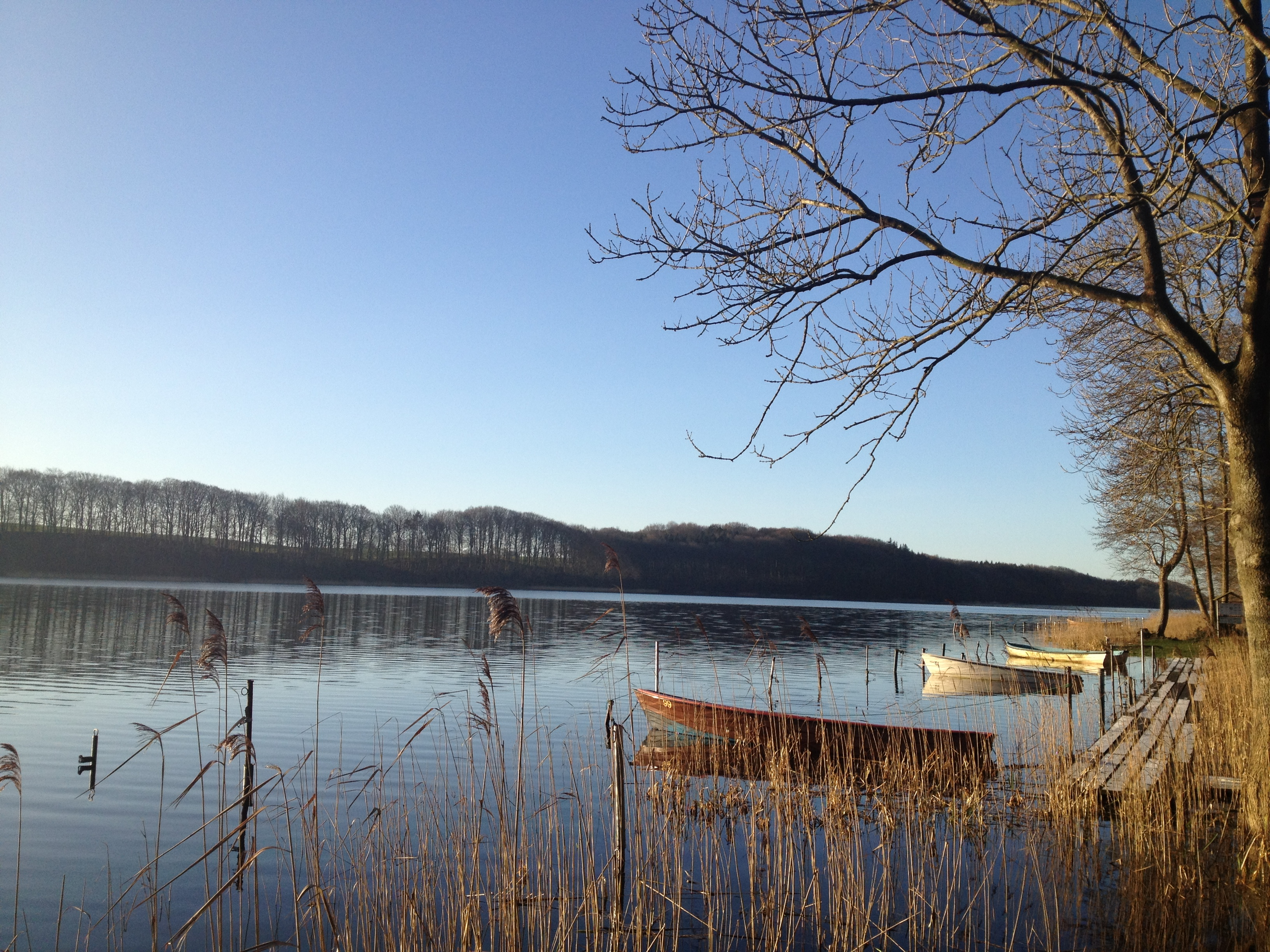
- Langsee, Süderfahrenstedter side

- Location within Schleswig-Holstein
- Location: Kreis Schleswig-Flensburg, Schleswig-Holstein
- Coordinates: 54°34′33″N 9°33′55.9″E
- Basin countries: Germany
- Surface area: 137.1 ha (339 acres)
- Max. depth: 13.3 m (43.6 ft)
- Surface elevation: 16.25 m (53.3 ft)

Langsee (Danish: Langsøen) is a lake in Angeln, in the district of Schleswig-Flensburg, Schleswig-Holstein, Germany. It lies near Süderfahrenstedt and has a surface area of about 137 ha.
