= List of bishops of Schleswig =

The List of the Bishops of Schleswig contains the names of the bishops of the see in Schleswig (Danish: Slesvig, English: Sleswick) in chronological order. Also Lutheran bishops, who officiated after 1542, superintendents and general superintendents are listed.

== Note ==
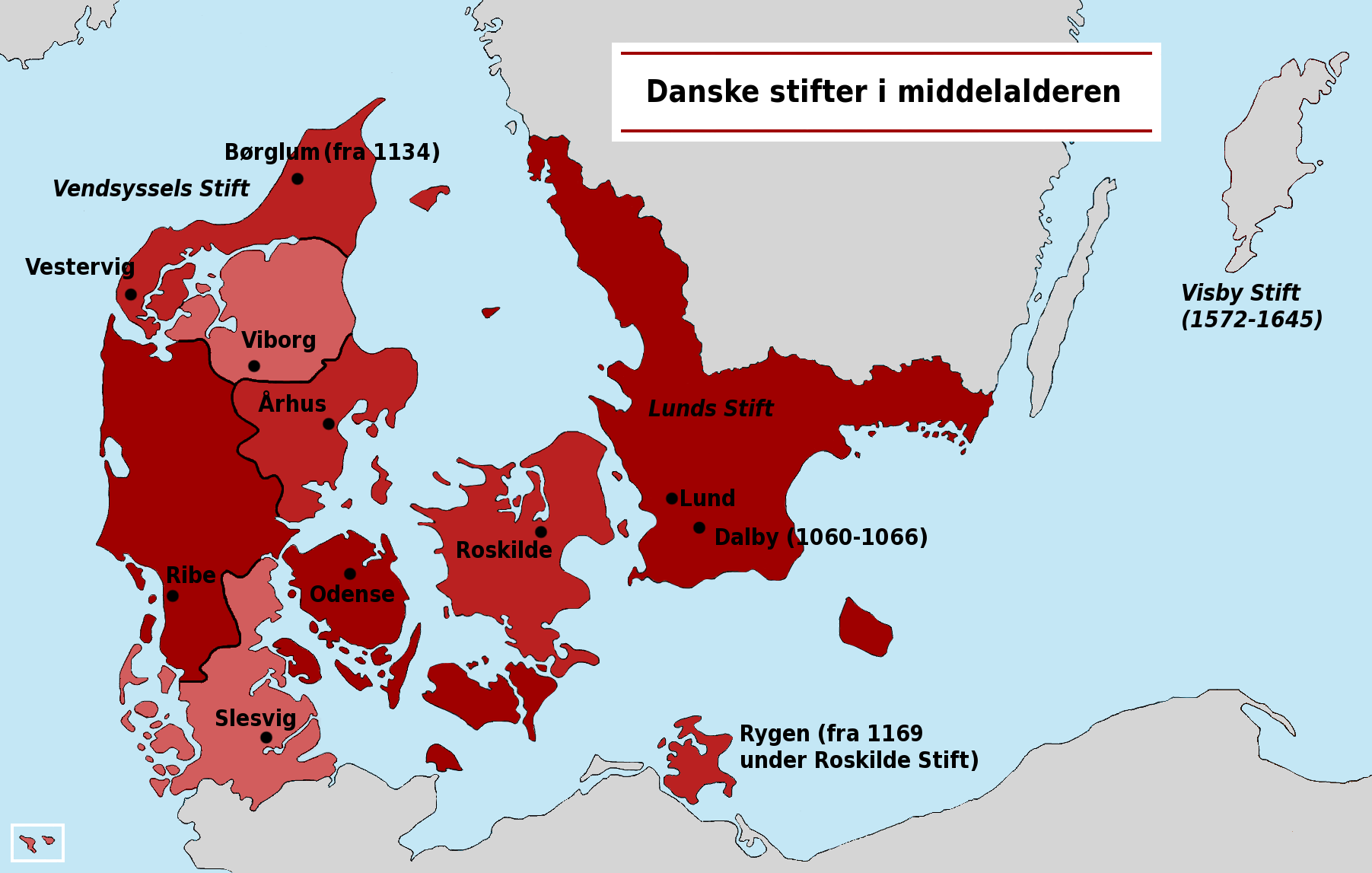
Danish dioceses in the Middle Ages

Between 947 and 948 Archbishop Adaldag of Hamburg-Bremen founded the three suffragan dioceses of Schleswig, Århus, and Ribe (Ripen). In 1104 the Schleswig see was redeployed in ecclesiastical hierarchy to become a suffragan to the Archdiocese of Lund.

Since 1542 the bishops were Lutherans, partially even lacking theological qualification but only collecting the prebends from the episcopal estates. Therefore, they were assisted by Lutheran (general) superintendents for the pastoral care. Most parishioners adopted Lutheranism too. After 1624 nobody was invested as Bishop of Schleswig any more. General superintendents fulfilled the pastoral functions as to Lutheran faithful. Between 1854 and 1864 the Lutheran church in the Duchy of Schleswig was reorganised as the Slesvig Stift led again by a cleric titled bishop.

In 1868, two years after the Prussian annexation of Holstein and Schleswig as the Province of Schleswig-Holstein the Lutheran churches in Holstein and Schleswig formed the Evangelical-Lutheran State Church of Schleswig-Holstein (Evangelisch-Lutherische Landeskirche Schleswig-Holsteins). By the separation of state and religion after 1918 the privilege of the Prussian monarch as summus episcopus (i.e. supreme governor/bishop of the church) was abolished.

Thus in 1925 Schleswig-Holstein's Lutheran church body assumed the title of bishop, one officiating for the Holstein area, seated in Kiel, and one for Southern Schleswig, seated in Schleswig. The new offices as bishops replaced the prior general superintendents and continued also after the Schleswig-Holstein church body merged with three neighbouring church bodies in the North Elbian Evangelical Lutheran Church in 1977. In 2008 a merger of the offices did away with the office Bishop of Schleswig. Northern Schleswig which returned to Denmark became the Diocese of Haderslev of the Church of Denmark. Their bishop also oversees the Danish Church in Southern Schleswig.

For the very few remaining, immigrating or converted Catholics pastoral functions were provided first by the Vicariate Apostolic of the Northern Missions (as of 1667; reduced by most South-Elbian regions renamed into the Vicariate Apostolic of the North in 1709), and later by the Prefecture Apostolic of Schleswig-Holstein (as of 1868). After 1920 Northern Schleswig became part of the Vicariate Apostolic of Denmark, which transformed into the Roman Catholic Diocese of Copenhagen on 29 April 1953. In Southern Schleswig the rest of the Prefecture Apostolic of Schleswig-Holstein was assigned to the Diocese of Osnabrück in 1929, which had to cede this extension again in favour of the new founded Archdiocese of Hamburg in 1994.

== Catholic bishops and administrator ==
- 947: Hored (also Oredo, Horath)
- 948–968: Marco
- 995–?: Poppo (d. ca. 1000)
- ?: Folkbert
- 999–1026: Ekkehard (also Ezico) of Oldenburg
- 1026–1034: Rodolphus (also Rudolf)
- 1043–1085: Ratolf
- 1085: Sigvard
- 1106: Gunnar (also Gunner)
- 1120–1135: Albert (also Adelbert)
- 1135–1139: Ricco (also Rike; d. ca. 1142), later also Bishop of Roskilde (1137–1138/1139)
- 1140–1141: Hermann of Schleswig (titular, never acceded his post)
- 1141–1145: Occo of Schleswig
- 1145–1161: Esbern, expelled by the Danish stadholder in Schleswig, died in Saxon exile
- 1161–1167: Occo of Schleswig, second term
- 1167–1179: Frederick I
- 1179–1208: Valdemar of Denmark (1157 or 1158–1235 or 1236, Cîteaux), also Prince-Archbishop of Bremen (1192 elect, 1206–1218 de facto).
- 1209–1233: Nicholas I, already per pro after Valdemar's imprisonment in 1192, consecrated as bishop after Valdemar's papal deposition
- 1234–1238: Tuco (also Tyge)
- 1240-1244: John I (Johannes/Jens)
- 1244–1255: Eskil
- 1255–1265: Nicholas II
- 1265–1282: Bonde (sold the episcopal residence of Gottorp to Eric II, Duke of Schleswig and moved his residence to Schwabstedt in 1268)
- 1282–1287: James (Jakob)
- 1287–1307: Berthold
- 1308–1331: John II of Bokholt
- 1331–1342: Hellembert of Fischbeck (Helmbrecht of Visbeke/Vischbeck)
- 1343–1351: Henry I of Warendorp
- 1351–1354: Dietrich Kagelwit (also Dietrich of Kugelweit, or Dietrich of Portitz; ca. 1300–1367), before auxiliary bishop of Brandenburg (1346–1347) and of Olomouc (1347–1351), later Prince-Bishop of Minden (1353–1361) and Prince-Archbishop of Magdeburg (1361–1367).
- 1354–1369: Nicholas III Brun
- 1370–1374: Henry II
- 1375–1421: John III Skondelev
- 1421–1428: Henry III vom See, resigned
- 1429–1474: Nicholas IV Wulf
- 1474–1488: Helrich von der Wisch
- 1488–1499: Eggert Dürkop
  - 1488: Enevold Sövenbröder (aka Enwald Sövenbroder, Enwaldus Soevenbroder; d. 14 August 1504), bishop elect, elected by the chapter, but not confirmed by the pope, he resigned in favour of the papally preferred Eggert Dürkop
- 1499–1502: sede vacante
  - Administrator Apostolic John IV (Juan) de Castro (Valencia, 1431–1506, Rome), simultaneously Bishop of Girgenti (1479–1506), Cardinal Priest of Santa Prisca (1496–1506), later also Bishop of Malta (1504–1506).
- 1502–1507: Detlef Pogwisch
- 1507–1542: Gottschalk von Ahlefeldt (also Godske Ahlefeldt; last Catholic bishop)

== Lutheran bishops and superintendents ==
- 1542–1551: Tilemann von Hussen (also van Hussen; Duchy of Cleves, 1497–1551, Schleswig), simultaneously general superintendent of the Lutheran Church in the Duchy of Schleswig
- 1551–1556: Frederick II, Prince of Denmark (1532–1556; son of King Frederick I of Denmark), simultaneously Prince-Bishop of Hildesheim
- 1556–1586: Adolf of Holstein-Gottorp (Flensburg, 1526–1586, Gottorp), simultaneously Duke of Holstein and Duke of Schleswig (1544–1586), assisted by Superintendent (-General as of 1564) Paul von Eitzen since 1562
- 1586–1602: sede vacante
  - 1586–1593 Paul von Eitzen (Hamburg, 1521–1598, Schleswig), superintendent of the Lutheran church of the Gottorp share of Holstein and Schleswig (as of 1562), general superintendent of the Lutheran church in the entire Duchies of Holstein and Schleswig (as of 1564); before Superintendent of Hamburg (1555–1562)
  - 1593–1602: Jacob Fabricius the Elder (superintendent)
- 1602–1624: Ulrik of Denmark (1578–1624, Rühn; titular duke of Holstein and Schleswig, son of Frederick II of Denmark and Sophie of Mecklenburg-Güstrow), simultaneously as Ulrich II Administrator of the Prince-Bishopric of Schwerin (1603–1624), married with Lady Catherine Hahn-Hinrichshagen

After Ulrik's death no more Bishop of Schleswig was invested until 1854.

== General superintendents for the royal shares of the Holstein and Schleswig duchies ==
The general superintendents were then first seated in Flensburg, since 1693 in Rendsburg. There were also general superintendents for the Duchies of Holstein (ducal share) and of Schleswig (ducal share).

- 1636–1668: Stephan Clotzius (also Klotz; Lippstadt, 13 September 1606 – 13 May 1668, Flensburg), first general superintendent for the Duchies of Holstein and of Schleswig (royal shares)
- 1668–1673: Bonaventura Rehefeld (also von Rehfeld; Kitzscher, 24 September 1610 – 7 July 1673, Schleswig), only competent for Schleswig, before court preacher in Bremervörde for Administrator Frederick II of the Prince-Archbishopric of Bremen (1643–1645)
- 1673–1678: Johan(n) Hudemann (Wewelsfleth, 12 October 1606 – 24 March 1678), he succeeded Rehefeld as general superintendent for Schleswig and served in the same function for Holstein royal share already since 1668
- 1678–1684: Christian von Stökken (also Støcken, Stöcken, and Stöken; Rendsburg, 15 August 1633 – 4 September 1684, ibidem)
- 1684–1709: Josua Schwartz (also Schwarz; Waldau in Pomerania, now Wałdowo a part of today's Sępólno Krajeńskie, 5 February 1632 – 6 January 1709, Rendsburg), he first served as general superintendent only for Schleswig royal share, but succeeded in 1689 also Just(us) Valentin Stemann as general superintendent for Holstein royal share too. Schwartz moved the united general superintendency to Rendsburg in 1693
- 1709–1721: Theodor Dassov (also Dassau, Dassow, Theodorus Dassovius; Hamburg, 27 February 1648 – 6 January 1721, Rendsburg), his ambit also included the formerly ducal Schleswig share, before served by general superintendent Heinrich Muhlius, who continued to officiate in Holstein ducal share
- 1721–1724: Thomas Clausen (also Claussen; Flensburg, 29 April 1677 – 23 April 1724, Hamburg)
- 1724–1728: Andreas Hojer (also Hoyer; Karlum, 16 May 1654 – 10 July 1728, Rendsburg), uncle of the homonymous Danish historian, served already as viceprovost for Schwartz since 1694
- 1728–1747: Georg Johannes Conradi (Riga, 27 February 1679 – 7 September 1747, Rendsburg), prior royal court preacher in Copenhagen (1720–1728)
- 1747–1757: Jeremias Friedrich Reuß (Horrheim, a part of today's Vaihingen upon Enz, 8 December 1700 – 6 March 1777, Tübingen), resigned in favour of a professorship at Eberhard Karls University of Tübingen, becoming also its chancellor
- 1757–1760: vacancy?
- 1760–1791: Adam Struensee (Neuruppin, 8 September 1708 – 20 May 1791, Rendsburg), in 1781, after general superintendent Hasselmann of Holstein (ducal share) had died, his ambit also included the formerly ducal Holstein share

== General provosts in Duke John's share of the Holstein and Schleswig duchies ==
- 1545–1553: Vincentius Alberti (died 1553), general provost, simultaneously visitator in Nordstrand, since 1549 also pastor and provost in Tondern
- 1554–1560: Johannes Vorstius, general provost, simultaneously provost of Haderslev, resigned in favour of the office as general provost for Holstein royal share, there also pastor in Itzehoe and provost of the Münsterdorf Consistory
- 1560–1569: Georgius Boëthius Agricola, general provost, simultaneously provost of Haderslev, since 1553 provost of Nordstrand
- 1569–1573: vacancy, unsuccessful touting for Lucas Bacmeister (1530–1608)
  - Peter Boëthius, pastor in Königsbüll, and H. Tast, pastor in Bupsee, served as vice-provosts per pro
- 1573–1580: Georgius Schröder, general provost, pastor in Haderslev, simultaneously provost of Haderslev and of Nordstrand
- After John's death his share was divided between his brothers Adolphus and Christian.

== General superintendents for the ducal shares of the Holstein and Schleswig duchies ==
The general superintendents were seated in Kiel. Their competence comprised until 1713 the ducal shares of the Duchies of Holstein and Schleswig. The Danish king as liege lord of the dukes of Schleswig deposed them in 1713 (confirmed in 1720), thereafter ducal co-rule was restricted to the Duchy of Holstein.

- 1549–1563: Volquard Jonas
- 1562–1593: Paul von Eitzen
- 1593–1610: Jacob Fabricius the Elder
- 1610–1616: Philipp Caesar
- 1616–1640: Jacob Fabricius the Elder
- 1640–1645: Jacob Fabricius the Younger
- 1645–1673: Johann Reinboth
- 1674–1684: Sebastian Niemann
- 1684/88–1697: Caspar Hermann Sandhagen
- 1698–1713: Heinrich Muhlius

Then Theodor Dassov, who had served earlier already in Schleswig royal share, and his successors took on.

== Bishop and general superintendents for Schleswig ==
- 1792–1834: Gen. Supt. Christian Adler (Arnis, 8 December 1756 – 22 August 1834, Giekau), simultaneously general superintendent for Holstein since 1806
- 1835–1848: Gen. Supt. Christian Friedrich Callisen (Glückstadt, 20 February 1777 – 3 October 1861, Schleswig)
- 1848–1850: Gen. Supt. Nicolaus Nielsen (Rendsburg, 19 April 1806 – 26 January 1888, Oldenburg) as general superintendent for the German-speaking parishes, deposed and exiled by the Danish government in 1850
- 1848–1850: Gen. Supt. Johannes Andreas Rehhoff (Tønder, 28 August 1800 – 9 January 1883, Hamburg) as general superintendent for the Danish-speaking parishes, deposed and exiled by the Danish government in 1850; afterwards Senior of Hamburg (1870–1879) for the Evangelical Lutheran Church in the State of Hamburg
  - 1850–1854: Supt. Christoph Karl Julius Asschenfeldt (Kiel, 5 March 1792 – 1 September 1856, Flensburg), he was appointed superintendent serving per pro the vacant general superintendency, he resigned in 1854
- 1854–1864: Bishop Ulrich Sechmann Boesen (Faaborg, 22 July 1797 – 11 February 1867, Vejle), after Hans Lassen Martensen refused the Schleswig see, on 11 April 1854 Boesen received it, officiating in Flensburg, Boesen was deposed by the Prussian occupants on 8 March 1864. He left for Vejle after Godt was appointed his successor, titled general superintendent. The title bishop was used again since 1925.
- 1864–1885: Gen. Supt. Bertel Petersen Godt (Rinkenæs, 17 September 1814 – 12 June 1885, Schleswig), during his term the Evangelical-Lutheran State Church of Schleswig-Holstein was formed (1867) from the previous Lutheran dioceses (Stifter) of Holstein and of Schleswig
- 1886–1917: Gen. Supt. Theodor Kaftan (Løjt near Åbenrå, 18 March 1847 – 26 November 1932, Baden-Baden)
- 1917–1925: Gen. Supt. Friedrich Petersen (1856–1930), in 1920 his ambit was reduced by North Schleswig, in whose western part he was succeeded by Gabriel Koch (1858–1922), Bishop of Ribe, and in whose eastern part by Valdemar Ammundsen (1875–1936), Bishop of Haderslev

== Lutheran bishops of Schleswig within the Evangelical-Lutheran State Church of Schleswig-Holstein ==
- 1925–1933: Eduard Völkel (Eckernförde, 1878–1957, Bordesholm), deposed by the Nazi-submissive majority of proponents of the Faith Movement of German Christians among the synodals
- 1933–1947: vacancy, until 1945 a partisan of the German Christians officiated as state bishop for all of Schleswig-Holstein
- 1947–1967: Reinhard Wester (Elberfeld, 2 June 1902 – 16 June 1975, Eutin)
- 1967–1978: D. Alfred Petersen (Altona, 13 November 1909 – 11 May 2004, Schleswig)

== Lutheran bishops of Schleswig within the North Elbian Evangelical Lutheran Church ==
- 1967-1978: Alfred Petersen
- 1979-1990: Karlheinz Stoll (Dörfel, a part of today's Schlettau, 12 June 1927 – 25 January 1992, Lübeck)
- 1991-2008: Hans Christian Knuth (b. 6 September 1940, in Greiz)

In 2008 the offices of bishop of Holstein and of Schleswig were merged as Bishop of Schleswig and Holstein.
