= Jakob Langebek =

Danish historian & linguist (1710–1775)

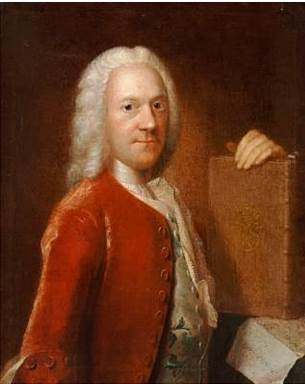
- Portrait attributed to Johan Hörner

Jakob Langebek (23 January 1710 - 16 August 1775) was a Danish historian, linguist, lexicographer, and archivist.

== Biography ==
He was born at Skjoldborg Parish in Thisted Municipality, Denmark. His father was a parish priest.

He obtained his education at the University of Copenhagen Langebek became a theology candidate in 1732. He was a favored student of historian Hans Gram. He studied Danish history, and it was by critical articles on contemporary writers in this field that he attracted attention. In 1737, he was employed at the Danish Royal Library and in 1748 he became an archivist.

In 1745 he founded a society for the study of the language and history of Denmark, Det kongelige danske Selskab for Fædrelandets Historie og Sprog (Royal Danish Society for Fatherland History and Language), and was its perpetual archivist. He edited the society's journal Danske Magazin (1745–53). His works consist of valuable contributions on his favorite subject to the journals, and to the Danske Magazin, which he edited and nearly all of which he wrote himself. His most important work was a collection of Danish historical documents from the Middle Ages, titled Scriptores Rerum Danicarum Medii Œvi (1772–1774). He was unable to finish its publication, and the work was completed by Peter Frederik Suhm and others from original papers (1778). He also collected material for a Danish dictionary. A collection of his letters was published in 1794.

Langebek was elected a foreign member of the Royal Swedish Academy of Sciences in 1753. He died at Copenhagen during 1775.
