= Österlen =

Region of Scania, Sweden

Coordinates: 55.626445°N 14.184723°E

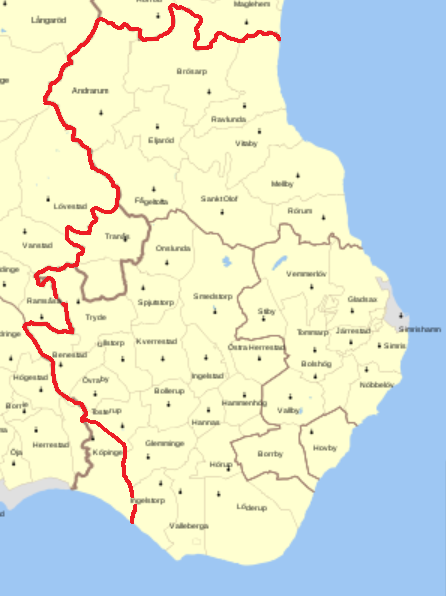
Historic map of Österlen

Unofficial flag of Österlen in popular use

Österlen (Swedish pronunciation: [œstɛˈɭeːn])) is a region in the southeast of the Swedish province of Scania (Skåne). Historically, the region was shared between the counties of Kristianstad and Malmöhus for a small part in the southwest, until Skåne County was created in 1997. Österlen includes the municipalities of Simrishamn and Tomelilla and a rural part of Ystad.

The towns of Simrishamn and Tomelilla are of very similar sizes, but the Simrishamn municipal population is somewhat larger. Österlen has approximately in between 35,000 and 40,000 permanent inhabitants but plenty of seasonal vacation homes means that the population soars during summer months.

The area is a tourist destination known for its natural environment, historic buildings, fishing hamlets, small towns and farmland.

== Geography ==
=== Municipalities ===
- Simrishamn
- Tomelilla
- Ystad (part)

=== Coastal settlements ===
- Baskemölla
- Brantevik
- Simrishamn (municipal seat)
- Skillinge
- Kivik

=== Inland settlements ===
- Borrby
- Brösarp
- Glemmingebro
- Gärsnäs
- Hammenhög
- Löderup
- Onslunda
- Sankt Olof
- Tomelilla (municipal seat)

== History ==
The name derives from its location 'the way eastwards' (ancient route from Ystad, heading north-east); (len is short for leden, i.e. route). In the past, the area west of Ystad was called "Västerlen" (the way westwards) but that term is no longer in use. In the 17th century, when Österlen and the whole of Scania (Skåne) were Danish, the Österlen area was called 'Östreslätt', which means 'the eastern plains' and comprised the area from Ystad to Simrishamn and probably the lands northwards until the woodland belt began. We have no 17th-century evidence of the usage of the word 'Österlen' as of today. The descriptive term Österlen is associated with the writings of Nils Lovén (1796–1858) who was a clergyman and university professor as well as an author and the ethnologist Nils Gustaf Bruzelius who claimed that it was a well-known fact that people from Österlen and people from Västerlen were always at loggerheads and were of very different natures. Bruzelius also considered the usage of the term "Österlen" as "ancient.".

Use of the term Österlen was popularized during the 1920s by author Fritiof Nilsson Piraten (1895–1972), poet Pehr Theodor Tufvesson (1884–1947) and newspaper journalist John Oskar Osterman (1871–1942). Many songs and poems have been written about Österlen. One of the most popular songs is Om himlen och Österlen, composed by Scanian singer-songwriter Michael Saxell.

Österlen was defined in 1929 as including Albo härad, Ingelstad härad and Järrestad härad in the southeastern part of the Scania. Today the term is associated with Tomelilla Municipality, Ystad Municipality and Simrishamn Municipality. Österlen encompasses the cities of Simrishamn and Tomelilla as well as including Stenshuvud National Park. The map that is published here is not historically correct in that Ingelstad härad/hundred included all the territory to the city of Ystad itself. There were temporary redrawings of this and other borders but from the beginning of the hundred system, Ingelstad went to the city of Ystad, and locations like Nybro and Köpinge are included in our first descriptions of Österlen.

== Climate ==
Österlen has a maritime climate with a moderate coastline and a slightly warmer interior during summers. There is a weather station in Skillinge 10 kilometres (6.2 mi) south of Simrishamn and until 2021 there was a station in Bollerup just south of Tomelilla. Österlen has a drier climate than elsewhere in Southern Sweden, although it has no active weather station measuring sunshine. Even so, the cool temperatures of the Baltic Sea keeps the immediate coastline on average a couple of degrees cooler during July days than in places further north in the country. This is due to the dominance of water in the surroundings, whereas the Mälar valley around Stockholm is surrounded by more land.

Especially during summer, seasonal lag is strong on the local coastline. This means that August averages the warmest summer nights and that September is a lot warmer than May as the sea water gradually warms. During winter, this maritime proximity of Österlen reverses the climate patterns and leads to average highs above 3 °C (37 °F) on the coastline and frosts usually being weak even while frequent. Records for Skillinge began in 1995 and as such do not contain likely historical extremes, whereas Bollerup had the station open from 1945 to 2021.

Climate data for Skillinge (2002–2021 averages, extremes since 1995)
Month	Jan	Feb	Mar	Apr	May	Jun	Jul	Aug	Sep	Oct	Nov	Dec	Year
Record high °C (°F)	11.2 (52.2)	13.4 (56.1)	19.5 (67.1)	21.9 (71.4)	25.6 (78.1)	31.1 (88.0)	30.5 (86.9)	32.0 (89.6)	26.9 (80.4)	20.9 (69.6)	16.8 (62.2)	12.0 (53.6)	32.0 (89.6)
Mean maximum °C (°F)	7.7 (45.9)	8.0 (46.4)	12.3 (54.1)	16.7 (62.1)	21.4 (70.5)	25.7 (78.3)	26.4 (79.5)	25.8 (78.4)	22.6 (72.7)	16.9 (62.4)	12.4 (54.3)	9.0 (48.2)	28.3 (82.9)
Mean daily maximum °C (°F)	3.3 (37.9)	3.3 (37.9)	5.8 (42.4)	9.7 (49.5)	14.3 (57.7)	19.1 (66.4)	21.5 (70.7)	21.0 (69.8)	17.6 (63.7)	12.4 (54.3)	8.3 (46.9)	5.1 (41.2)	11.8 (53.2)
Daily mean °C (°F)	1.3 (34.3)	1.2 (34.2)	3.1 (37.6)	6.4 (43.5)	10.6 (51.1)	15.0 (59.0)	17.5 (63.5)	17.5 (63.5)	14.4 (57.9)	9.9 (49.8)	6.3 (43.3)	3.1 (37.6)	8.9 (47.9)
Mean daily minimum °C (°F)	−0.8 (30.6)	−0.9 (30.4)	0.3 (32.5)	3.0 (37.4)	6.9 (44.4)	10.9 (51.6)	13.5 (56.3)	14.0 (57.2)	11.1 (52.0)	7.3 (45.1)	4.2 (39.6)	1.0 (33.8)	5.9 (42.6)
Mean minimum °C (°F)	−9.6 (14.7)	−7.1 (19.2)	−5.7 (21.7)	−2.0 (28.4)	0.9 (33.6)	5.7 (42.3)	9.0 (48.2)	8.5 (47.3)	5.4 (41.7)	0.3 (32.5)	−3.0 (26.6)	−6.3 (20.7)	−11.1 (12.0)
Record low °C (°F)	−16.8 (1.8)	−14.6 (5.7)	−16.1 (3.0)	−4.8 (23.4)	−1.5 (29.3)	2.1 (35.8)	7.0 (44.6)	6.0 (42.8)	2.9 (37.2)	−5.9 (21.4)	−7.1 (19.2)	−17.7 (0.1)	−17.7 (0.1)
Average precipitation mm (inches)	52.4 (2.06)	33.5 (1.32)	31.2 (1.23)	22.8 (0.90)	36.0 (1.42)	43.8 (1.72)	57.1 (2.25)	61.0 (2.40)	42.3 (1.67)	67.1 (2.64)	59.3 (2.33)	52.9 (2.08)	559.4 (22.02)
Source 1: SMHI Open Data for Skillinge A, precipitation
Source 2: SMHI Open Data for Skillinge A, temperature

Climate data for Bollerup; (2002–2020 averages; extremes since 1948)
Month	Jan	Feb	Mar	Apr	May	Jun	Jul	Aug	Sep	Oct	Nov	Dec	Year
Record high °C (°F)	9.9 (49.8)	13.5 (56.3)	19.0 (66.2)	25.1 (77.2)	28.0 (82.4)	31.2 (88.2)	32.1 (89.8)	33.1 (91.6)	26.7 (80.1)	22.3 (72.1)	15.5 (59.9)	10.9 (51.6)	33.1 (91.6)
Mean maximum °C (°F)	7.0 (44.6)	7.7 (45.9)	12.9 (55.2)	18.7 (65.7)	23.4 (74.1)	26.9 (80.4)	28.3 (82.9)	28.0 (82.4)	23.3 (73.9)	17.3 (63.1)	12.1 (53.8)	8.3 (46.9)	29.5 (85.1)
Mean daily maximum °C (°F)	2.6 (36.7)	3.0 (37.4)	6.3 (43.3)	11.8 (53.2)	16.9 (62.4)	20.7 (69.3)	23.1 (73.6)	22.5 (72.5)	18.5 (65.3)	12.4 (54.3)	7.8 (46.0)	4.5 (40.1)	12.5 (54.5)
Daily mean °C (°F)	0.5 (32.9)	0.7 (33.3)	3.0 (37.4)	7.2 (45.0)	11.8 (53.2)	15.5 (59.9)	17.9 (64.2)	17.8 (64.0)	14.3 (57.7)	8.4 (47.1)	5.6 (42.1)	2.5 (36.5)	8.8 (47.8)
Mean daily minimum °C (°F)	−1.6 (29.1)	−1.6 (29.1)	−0.4 (31.3)	2.6 (36.7)	6.7 (44.1)	10.2 (50.4)	12.7 (54.9)	13.1 (55.6)	10.1 (50.2)	6.3 (43.3)	3.4 (38.1)	0.5 (32.9)	5.2 (41.3)
Mean minimum °C (°F)	−10.8 (12.6)	−8.5 (16.7)	−6.6 (20.1)	−2.4 (27.7)	1.0 (33.8)	5.3 (41.5)	8.1 (46.6)	7.9 (46.2)	4.3 (39.7)	−1.3 (29.7)	−3.8 (25.2)	−7.2 (19.0)	−13.0 (8.6)
Record low °C (°F)	−19.2 (−2.6)	−18.8 (−1.8)	−17.1 (1.2)	−8.6 (16.5)	−2.0 (28.4)	1.2 (34.2)	0.2 (32.4)	0.4 (32.7)	−1.1 (30.0)	−6.0 (21.2)	−10.0 (14.0)	−20.1 (−4.2)	−20.1 (−4.2)
Average precipitation mm (inches)	65.2 (2.57)	47.6 (1.87)	37.5 (1.48)	27.7 (1.09)	38.7 (1.52)	54.7 (2.15)	59.0 (2.32)	70.3 (2.77)	50.0 (1.97)	83.9 (3.30)	70.1 (2.76)	69.0 (2.72)	673.7 (26.52)
Source 1: SMHI Open Data
Source 2: SMHI Open Data

== Historical buildings and places ==
Historical buildings in Österlen include the medieval castle Glimmingehus, St. Nicholas Church in Simrishamn, known since the 12th century, and the medieval St. Olof Church. Ale's Stones near Kåseberga on the south coast and The King's Grave in Kivik are ancient historical monuments.

== Cultural events and festivals ==
Cultural events and festivals such as the arts exhibition Konstrundan and the apple market in Kivik are arranged every year.

== Gallery ==
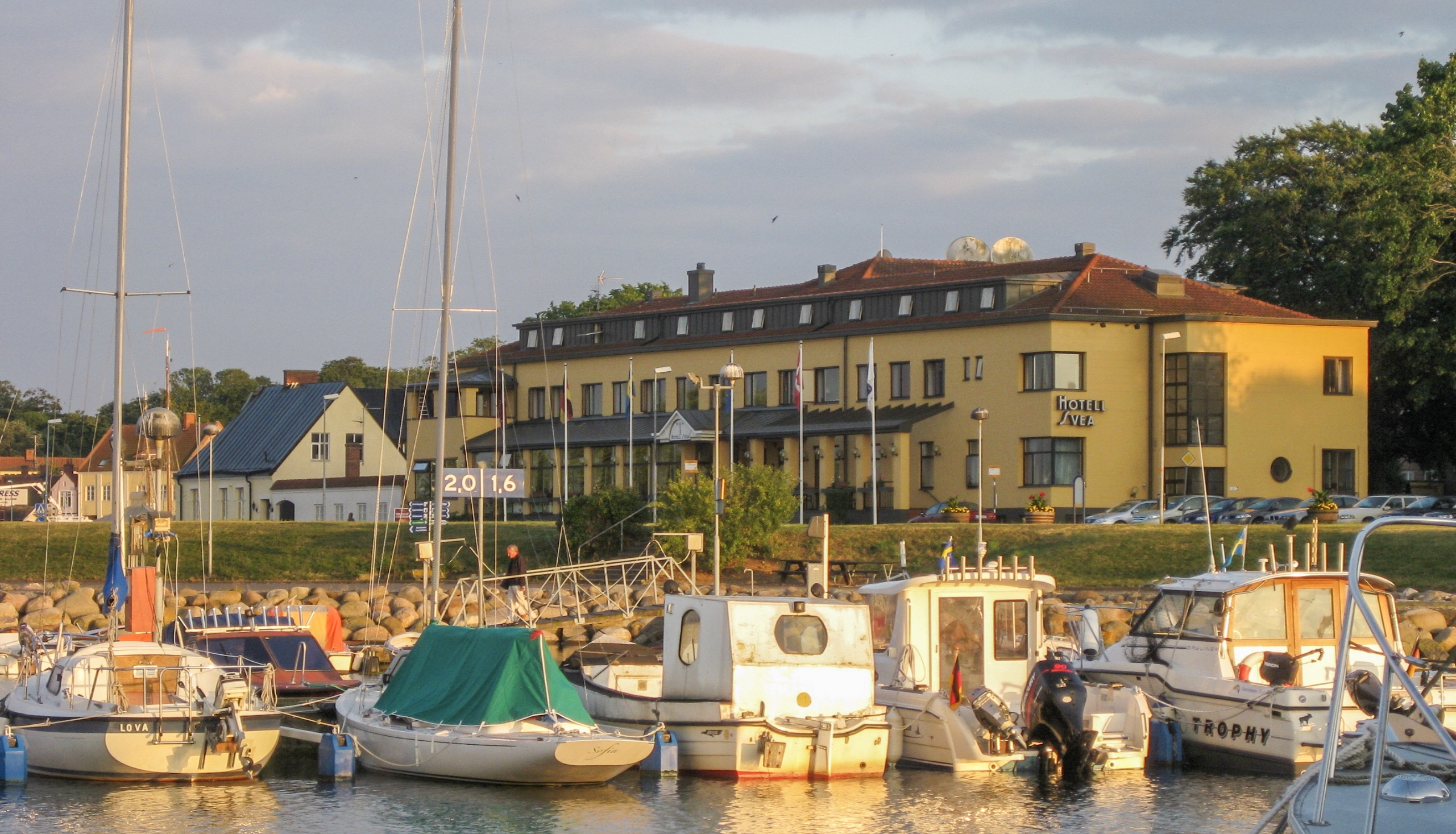
Hotell Svea

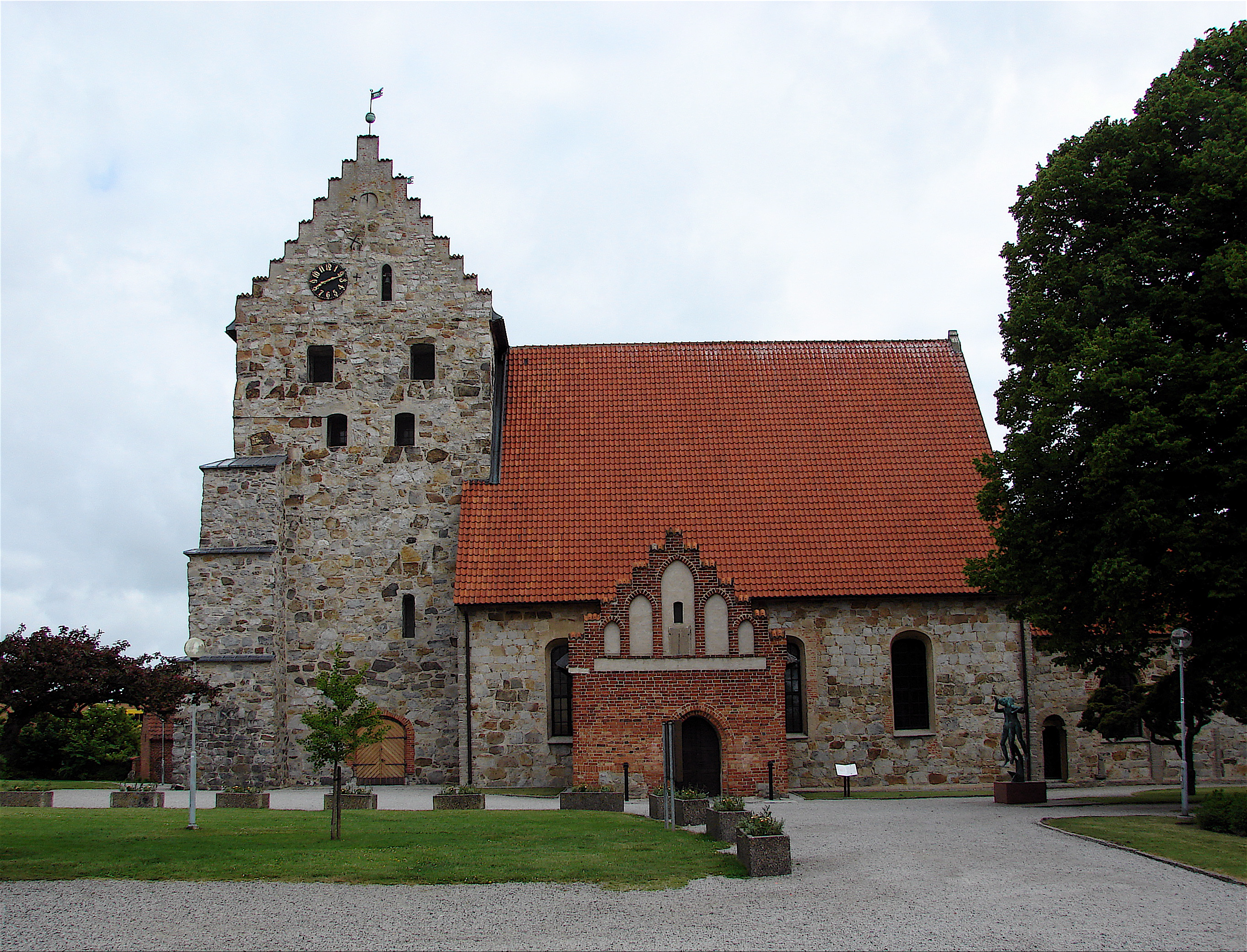
Sankt Nicolai kyrka in Simrishamn

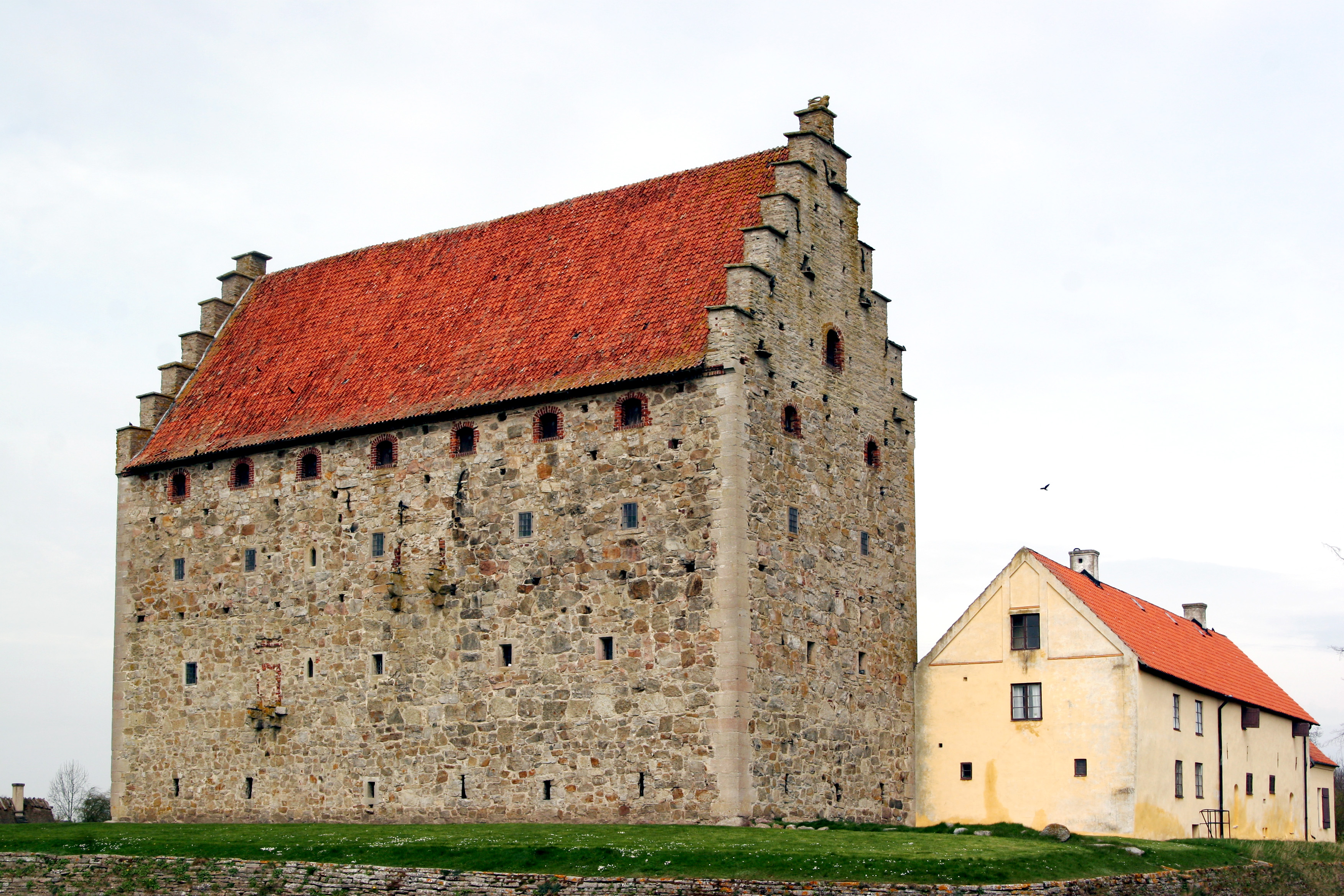
Glimmingehus

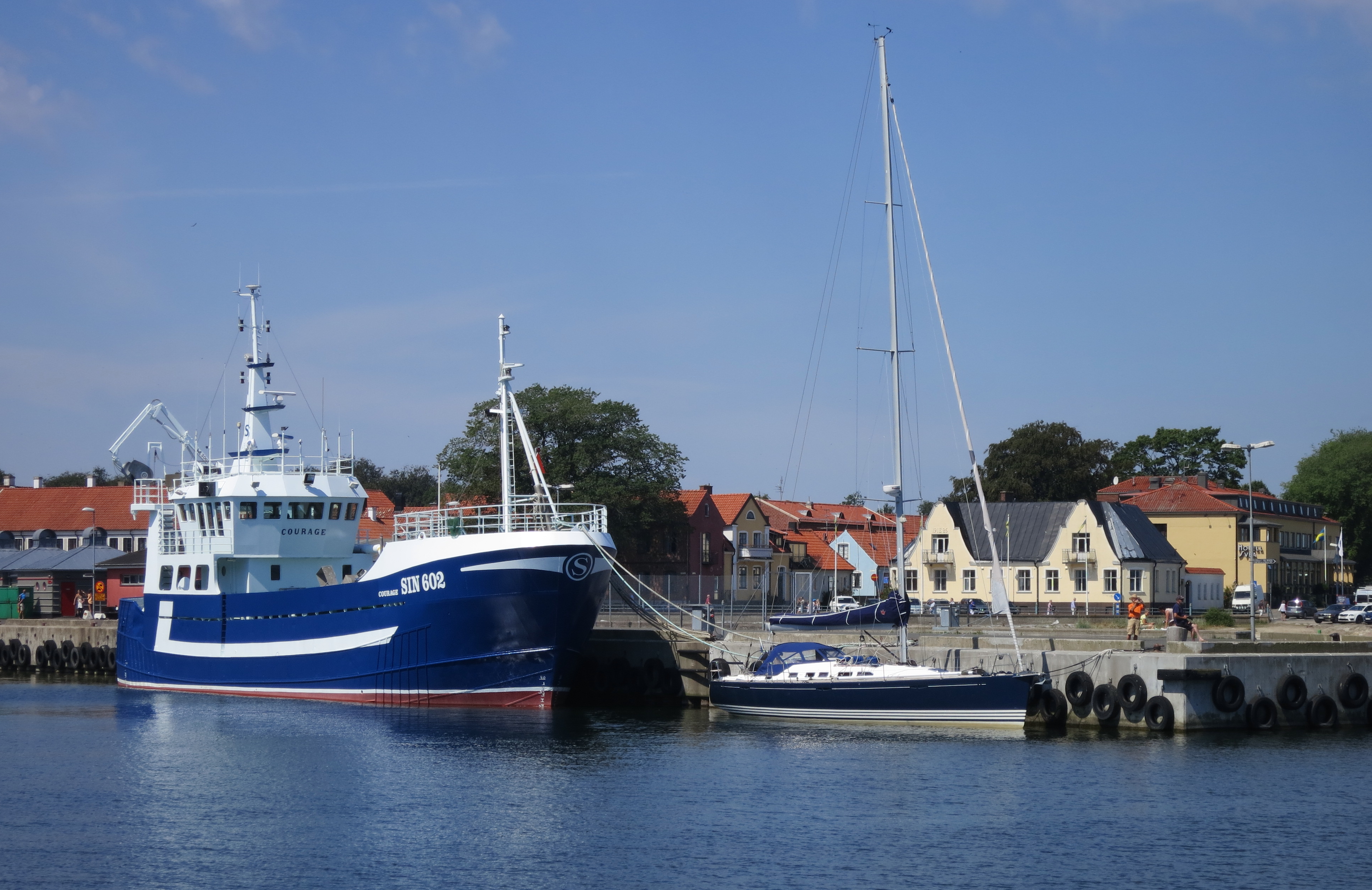
Simrishamn harbour

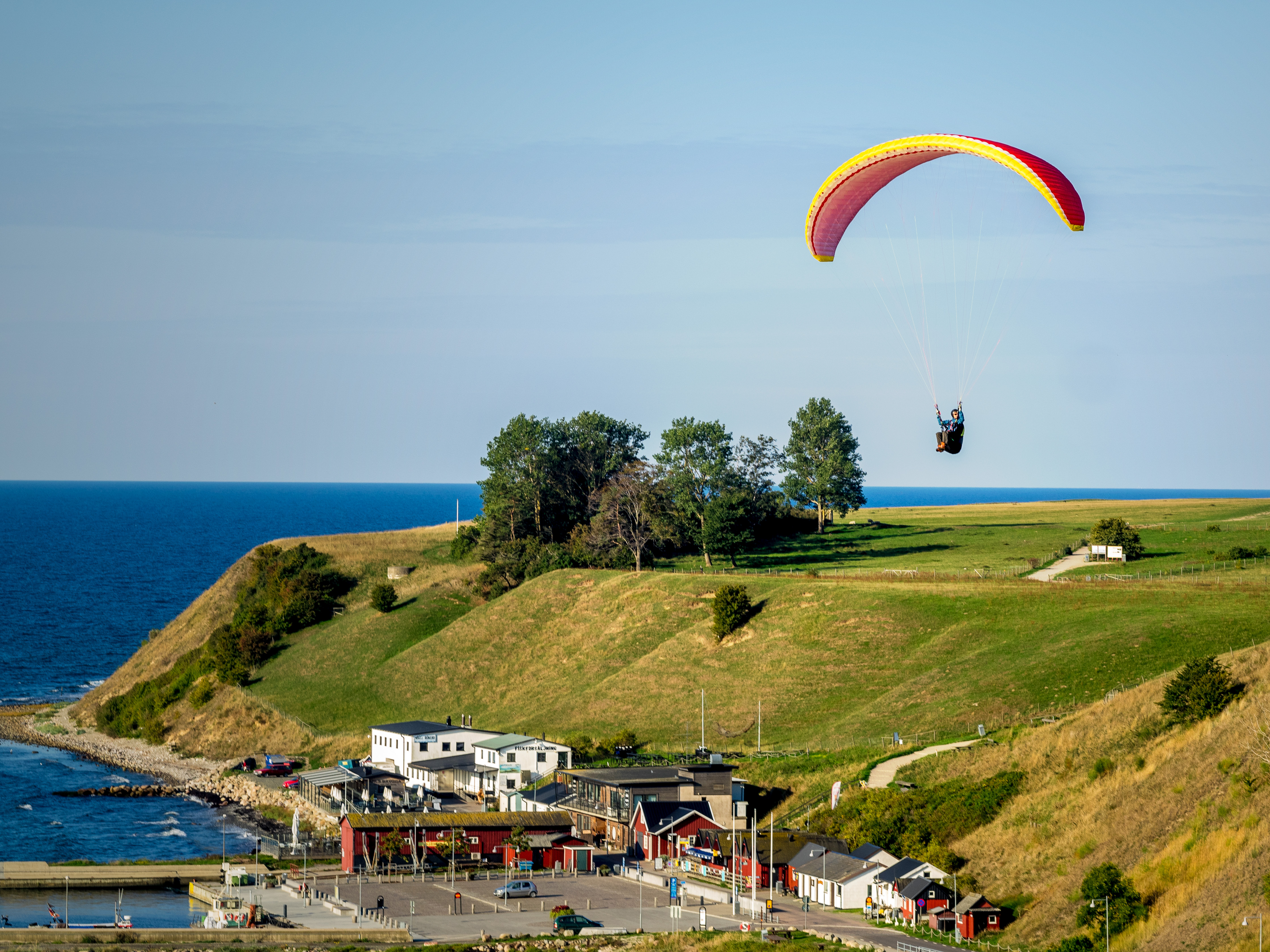
Kåseberga harbour

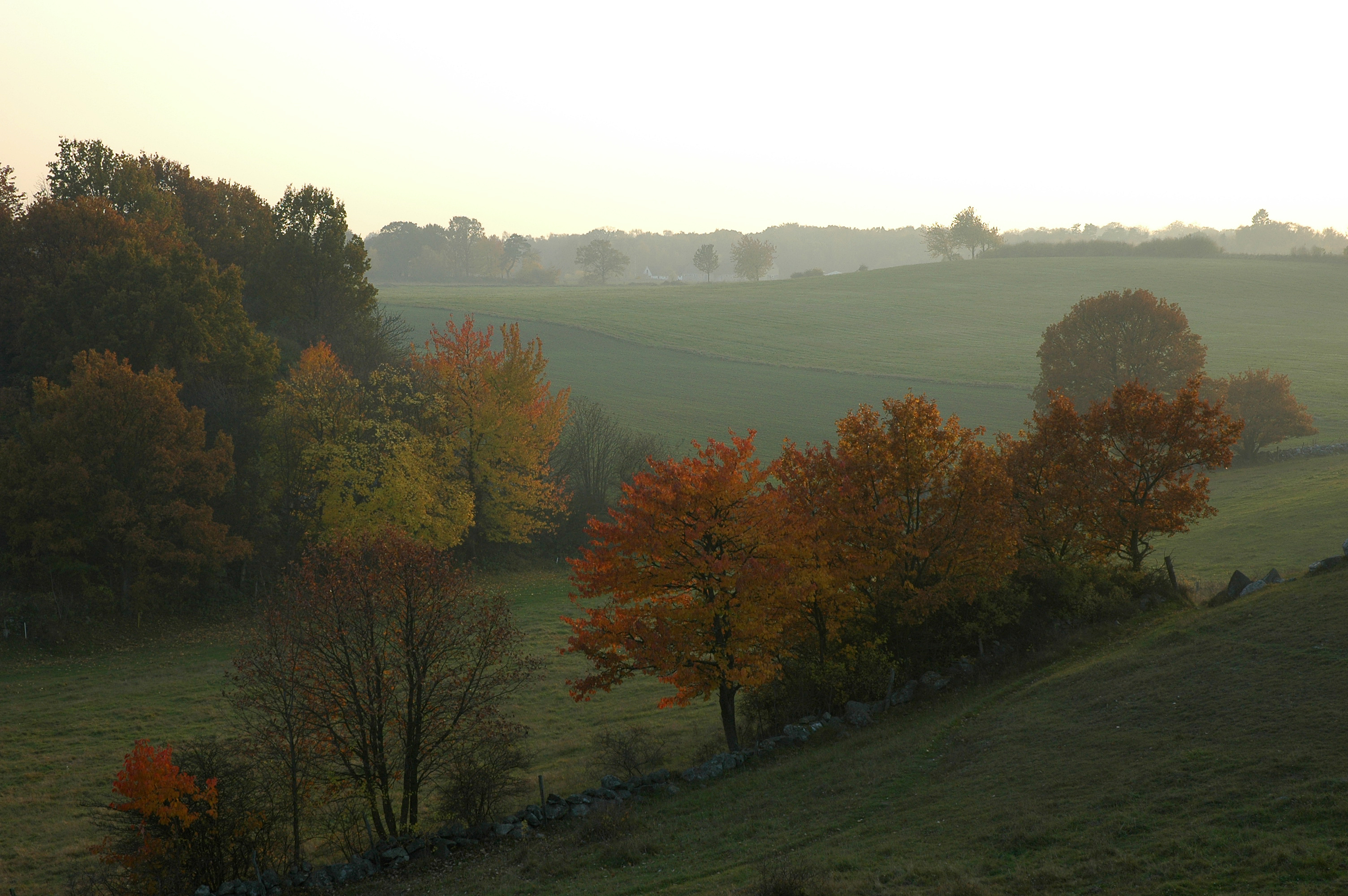
Brösarps backar

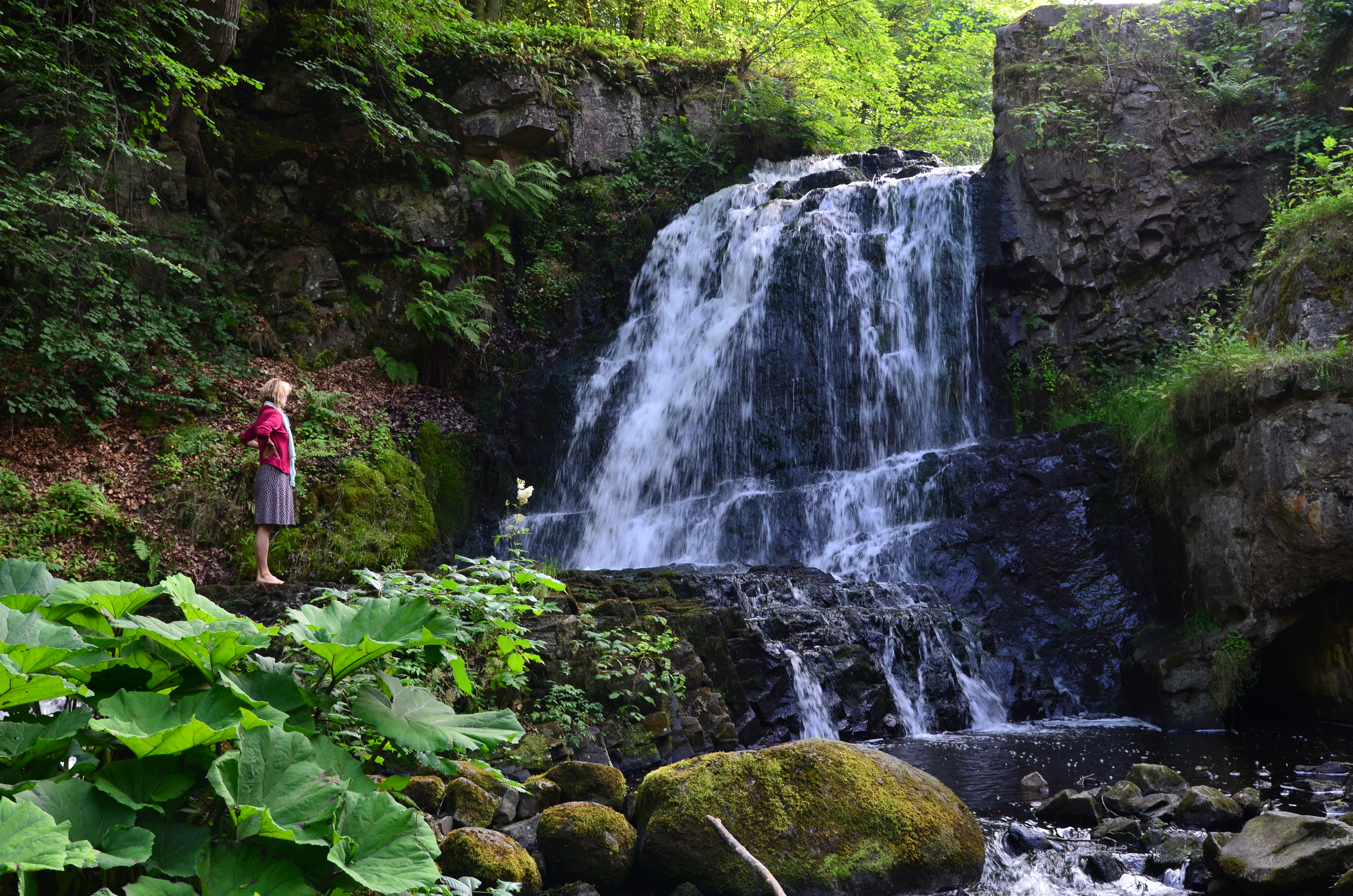
Forsemölla near Rörum

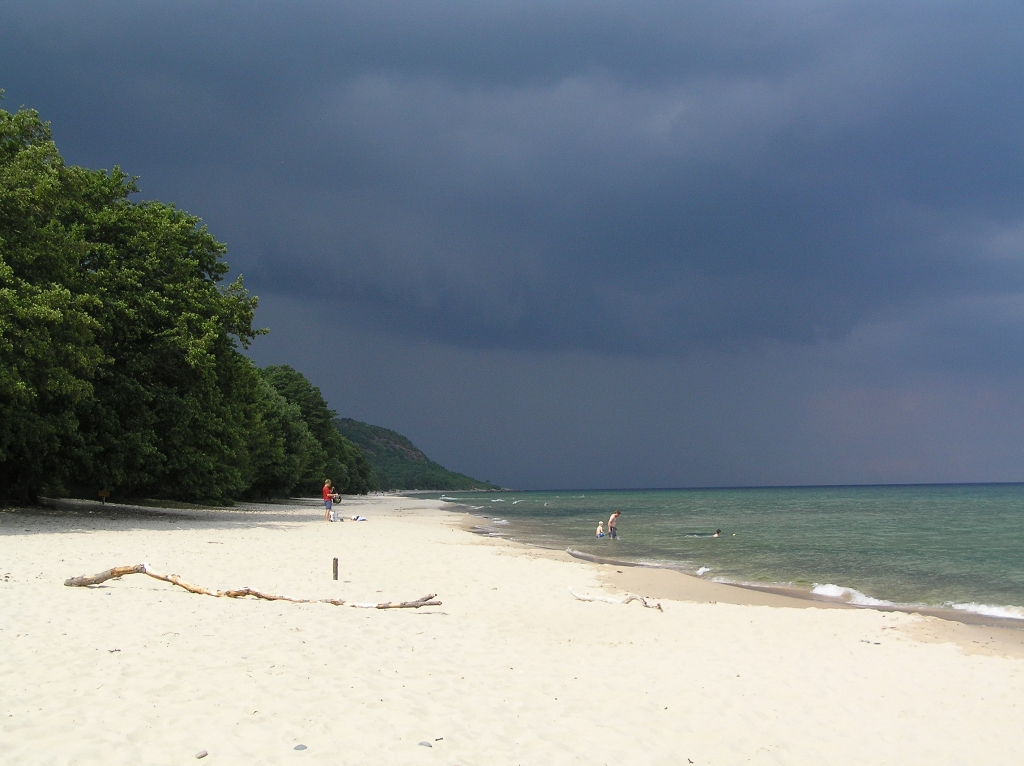
East coast beach

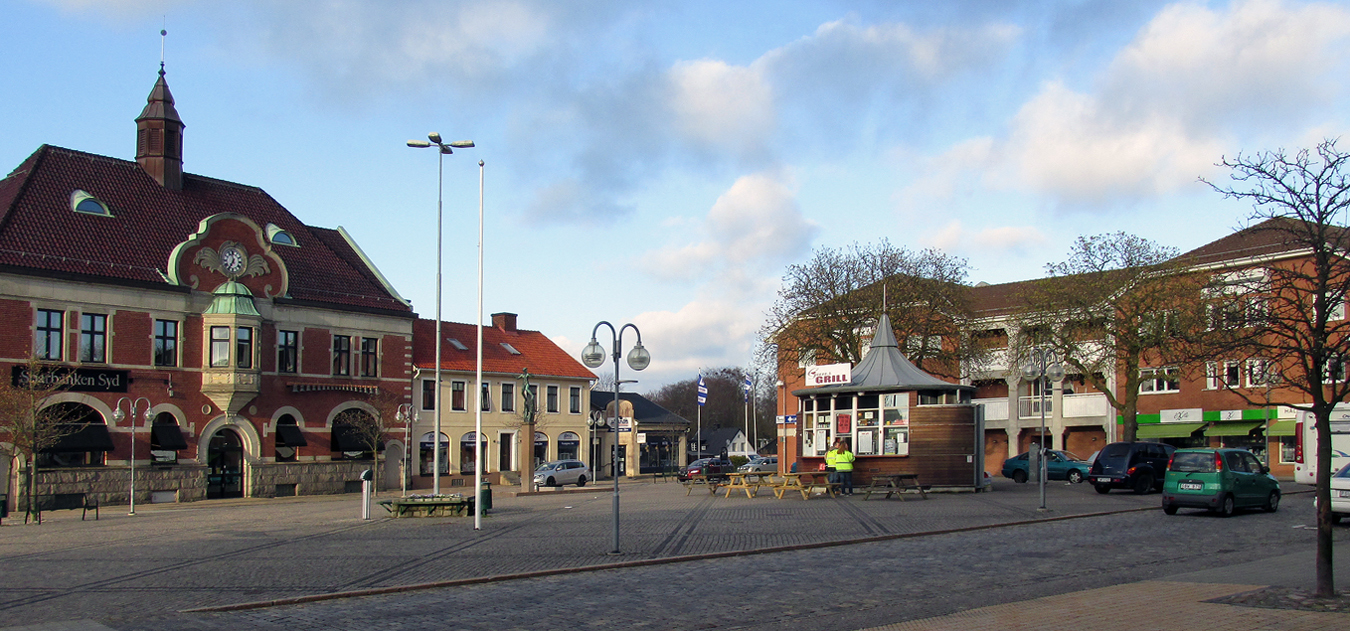
Stortorget in Tomelilla
