= Vitaby =

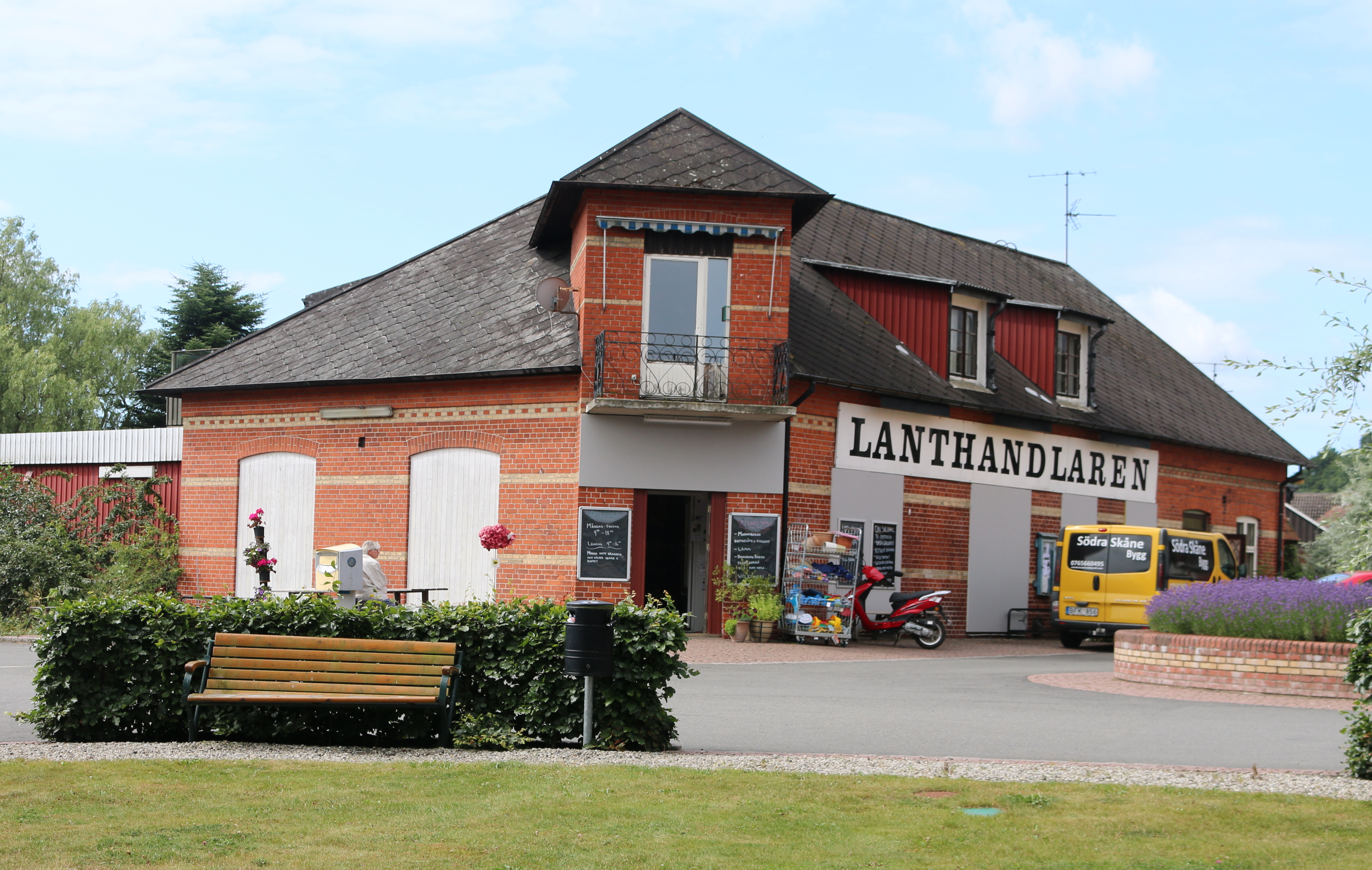

- Location within Skåne Location within Sweden
- Coordinates: 55°42′N 14°10′E
- Country: Sweden
- Province: Skåne
- County: Skåne County
- Municipality: Simrishamn Municipality

Area
  - Total: 0.37 km^{2} (0.14 sq mi)

Population (31 December 2010)
  - Total: 278
  - Density: 747/km^{2} (1,930/sq mi)
- Time zone: UTC+1 (CET)
  - Summer (DST): UTC+2 (CEST)

Vitaby is a locality situated in Simrishamn Municipality, Skåne County, Sweden with 278 inhabitants in 2010.
