= Simrishamn Municipality =

Simrishamn Municipality Simrishamns kommun
- Municipality
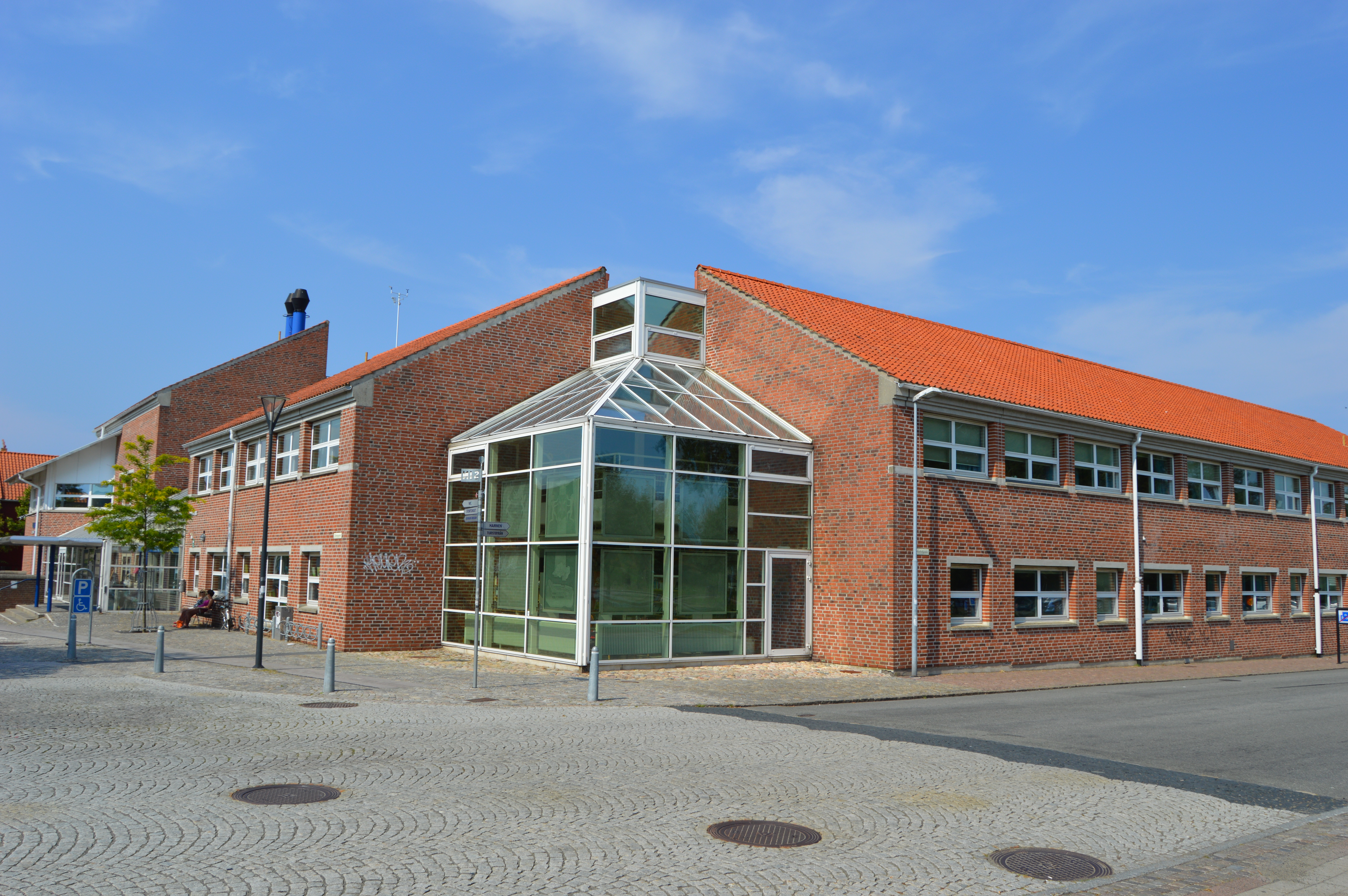
- Simrishamn Library

- Coat of arms

- Coordinates: 55°33′N 14°21′E
- Country: Sweden
- County: Skåne County
- Seat: Simrishamn

Area
  - Total: 1,261.15 km^{2} (486.93 sq mi)
  - Land: 391.36 km^{2} (151.10 sq mi)
  - Water: 869.79 km^{2} (335.83 sq mi)
- Area as of 1 January 2014.

Population (30 June 2025)
  - Total: 18,844
  - Density: 48.150/km^{2} (124.71/sq mi)
- Time zone: UTC+01:00 (CET)
  - Summer (DST): UTC+02:00 (CEST)
- ISO 3166 code: SE
- Province: Scania
- Municipal code: 1291
- Website: www.simrishamn.se

Simrishamn Municipality (Swedish: Simrishamns kommun) is a municipality in Skåne County in southern Sweden. Its seat is located in the city Simrishamn.

The creation of the present municipality took place during the last of the two nationwide municipal reforms carried out in Sweden during the second half of the 20th century. In 1969 a number of surrounding rural municipalities were merged with the City of Simrishamn. The enlarged city became a municipality of unitary type in 1971 and in 1974 more territory was added. The number of original entities (pre-1952) is twenty.

== Geography ==
The landscape south and west of Simrishamn is mainly open and flat farmland. To the north of Simrishamn the landscape is broken up by small forests and gently sloping hills. The coastline directly south and north of Simrishamn is stony. Stenshuvud National Park is located by the shore, within the municipal borders. Simrishamn is located in the Österlen area.

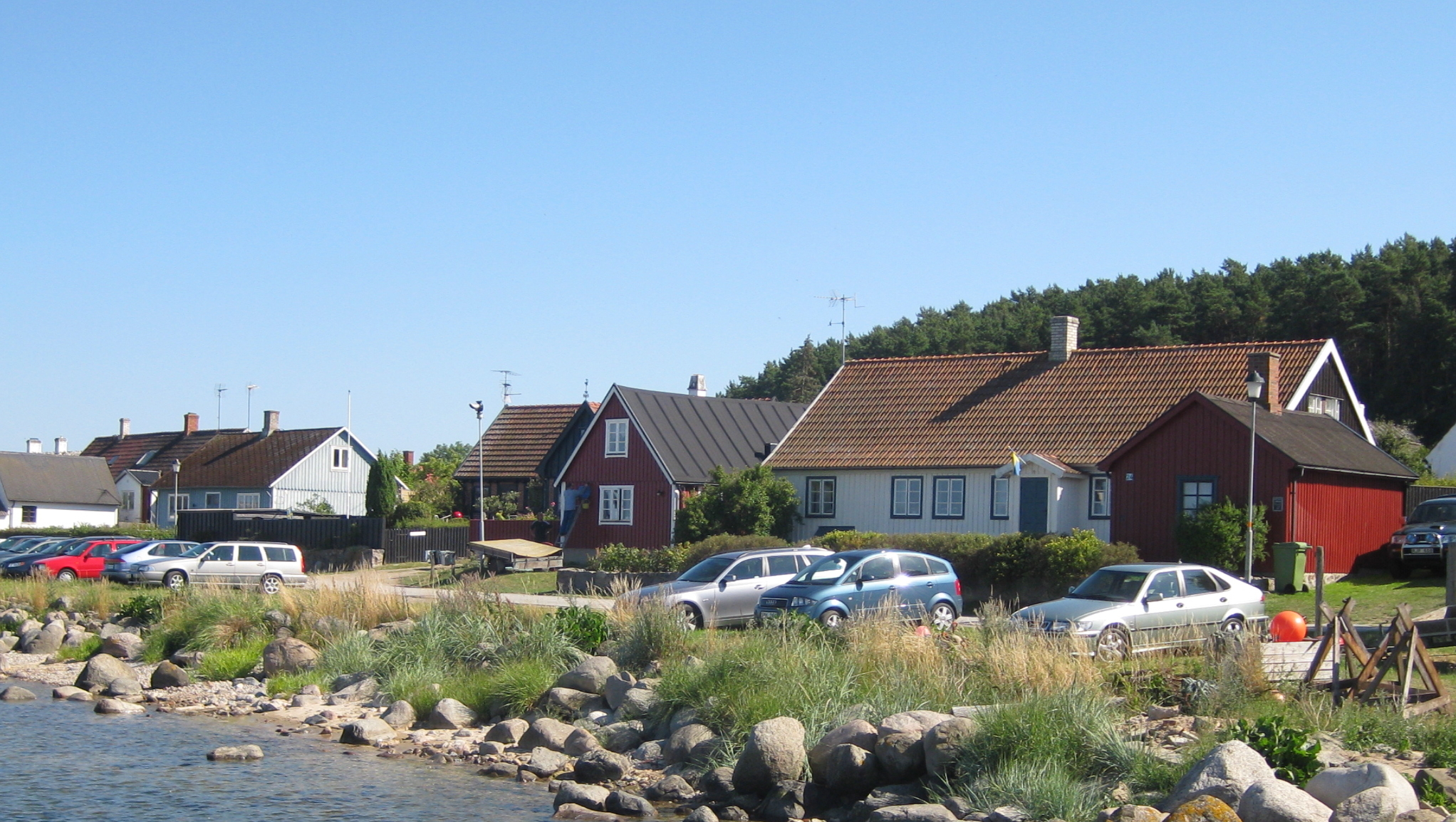
Vitemölla, Simrishamn municipality

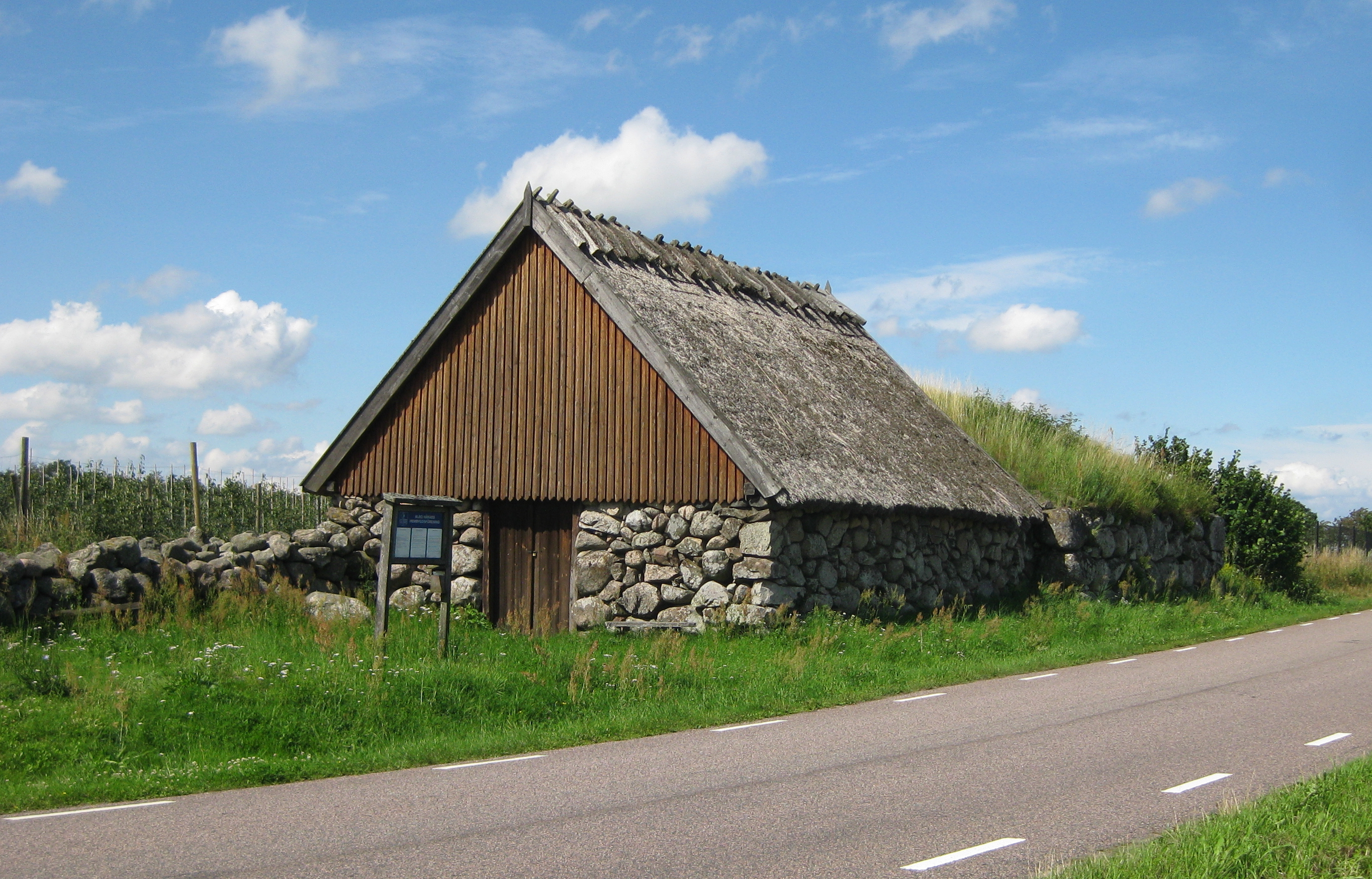
Åkarps brydestua is a barn for flax drying from the 18th century in Simrishamn municipality

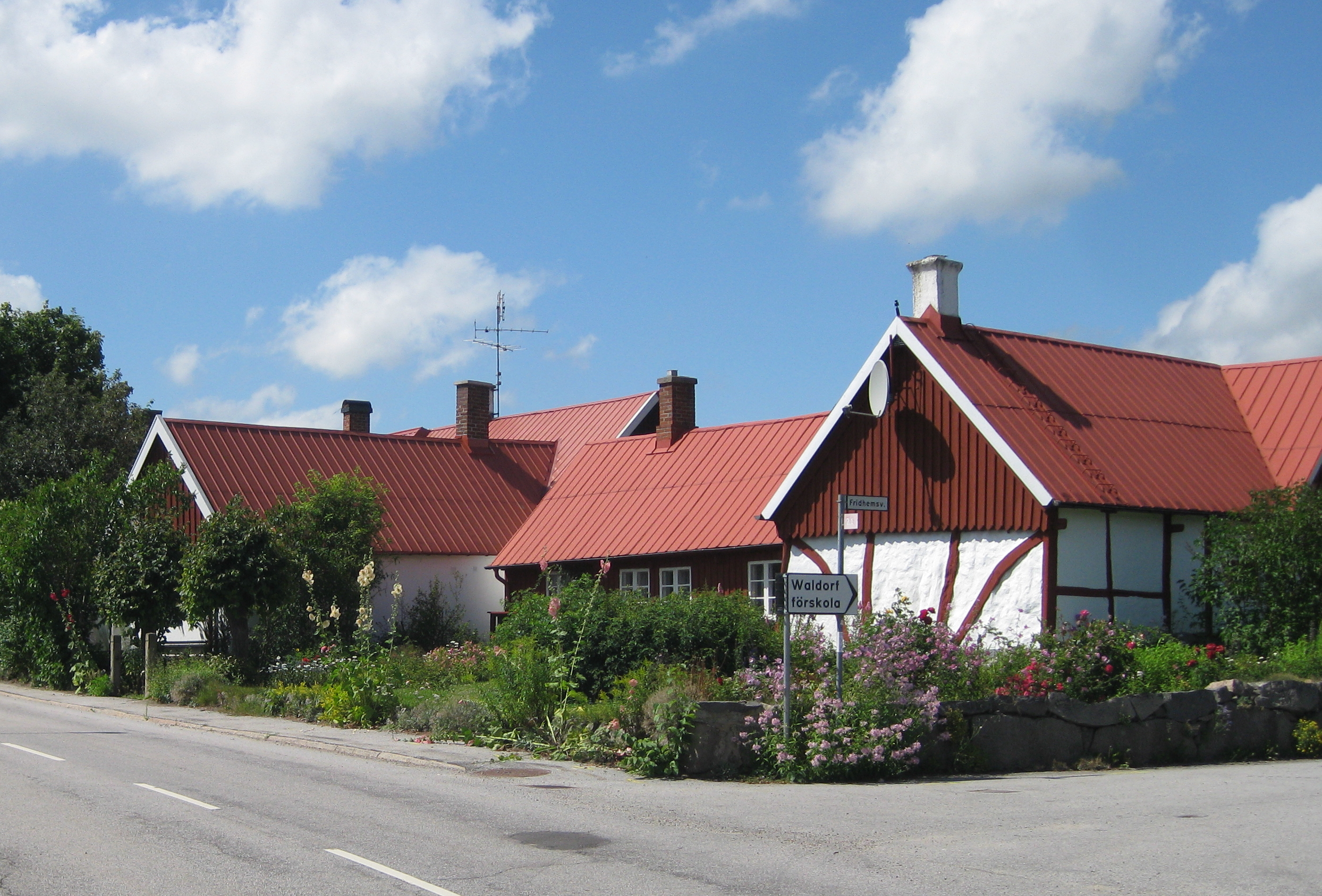
Farm in Rörum, Simrishamn municipality

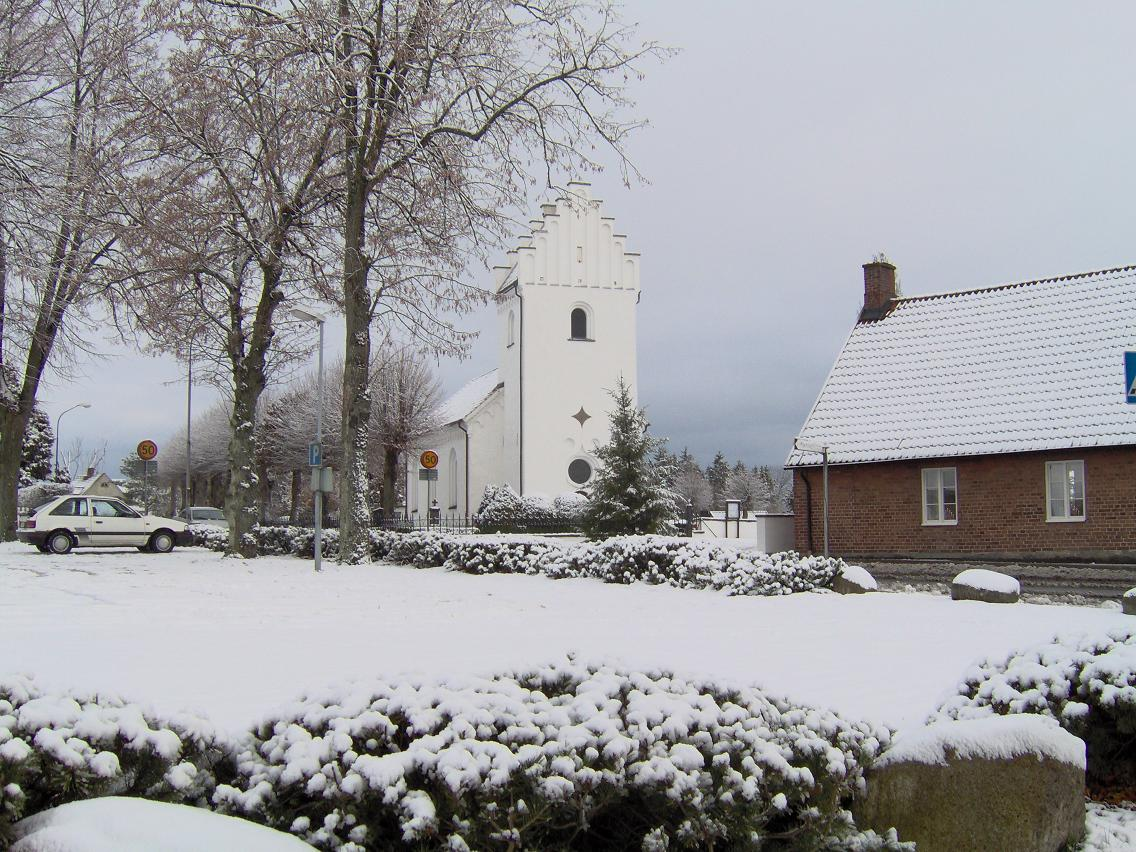
Hammenhögs Kyrka in Hammenhög, Simrishamn Municipality

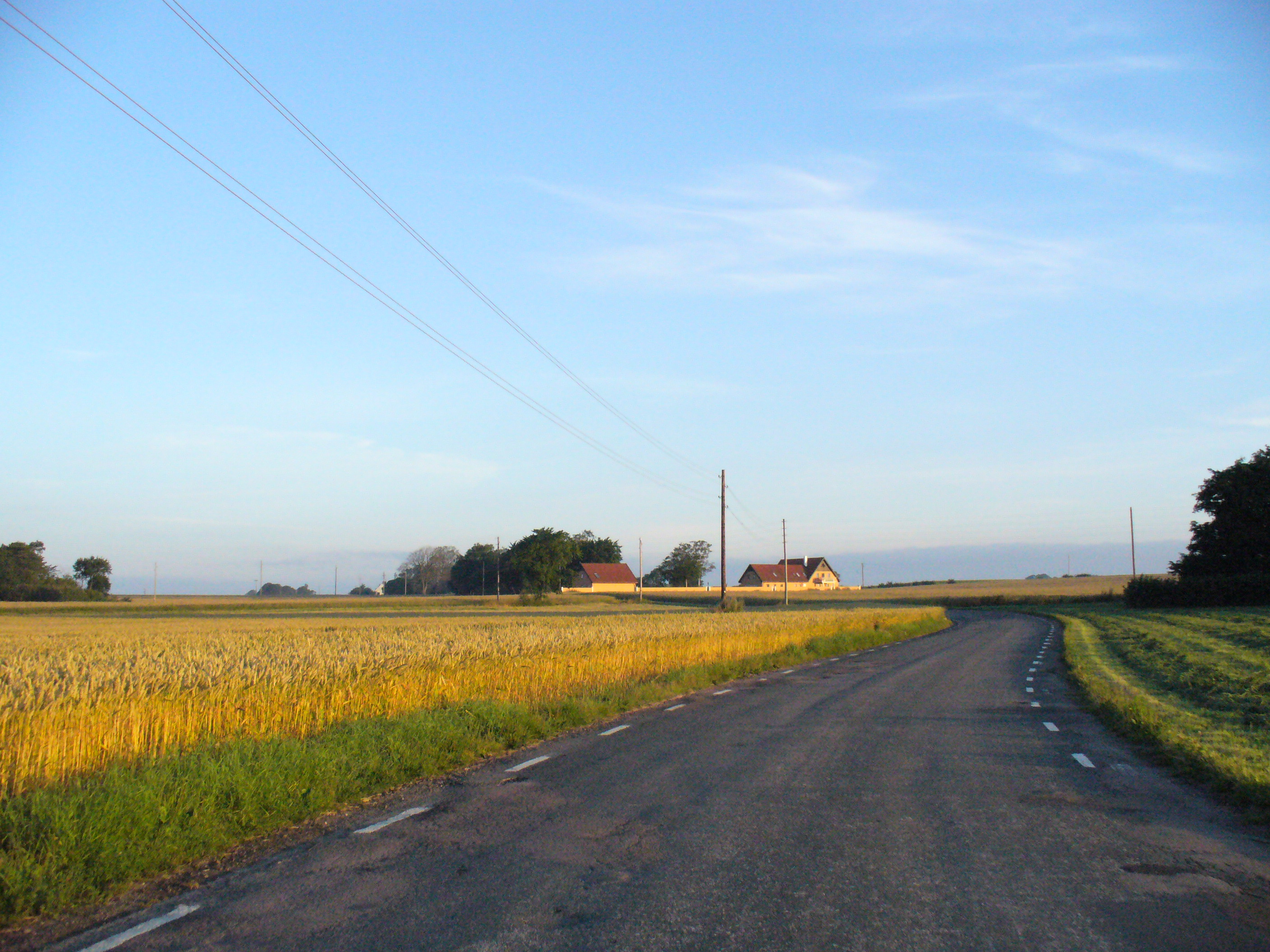
Malarhusen, Simrishamn Municipality

=== Localities ===
There are 13 urban areas (also called tätorter or localities) in Simrishamn Municipality. In the table they are listed according to the size of the population as of December 31, 2005. The municipal seat is in bold characters.

#	Locality	Population
1	**Simrishamn**	6546
2	Kivik	1013
3	Skillinge	1005
4	Gärsnäs	955
5	Borrby	947
6	Hammenhög	908
7	Sankt Olof	640
8	Brantevik	451
9	Östra Tommarp	279
10	Vik	264
11	Vitaby	255
12	Baskemölla	238
13	Simris	235

=== Minor localities ===
There are 14 minor localities (also called småorter) in Simrishamn Municipality. In the table they are listed according to the size of the population as of December 31, 2005.

#	Minor locality	Population
14	Östra Vemmerlöv	194
15	Gröstorp	190
16	Järrestad	170
17	Gladsax	128
18	Ravlunda	111
19	Sandby	105
20	Vitemölla	100
21	Södra Mellby	92
22	Örnahusen	87
23	Gyllebo	69
24	Vallby	67
25	Skräddaröd	58
26	Östra Hoby	55
27	Raskarum + Ljunglyckorna*	54

* Counted together

== Demographics ==
This is a demographic table based on Simrishamn Municipality's electoral districts in the 2022 Swedish general election sourced from SVT's election platform, in turn taken from SCB official statistics.

In total there were 19,250 residents, including 15,679 Swedish citizens of voting age. 42.5% voted for the left coalition and 55.9% for the right coalition. Indicators are in percentage points except population totals and income.

Location	Residents	Citizen adults	Left vote	Right vote	Employed	Swedish parents	Foreign heritage	Income SEK	Degree
Location			%	%					
Borrby	1,356	1,102	37.8	60.7	74	84	16	21,800	32
Gladsax	1,152	964	42.4	55.8	82	91	9	25,764	40
Gärsnäs	2,595	2,075	37.9	61.0	80	88	12	23,170	31
Hammenhög	1,599	1,212	37.3	60.4	80	85	15	24,855	29
Kivik	992	867	45.2	53.5	79	89	11	23,935	49
Rörum	683	551	51.0	48.2	83	91	9	25,642	57
S:t Olof	1,151	881	41.7	56.5	84	87	13	22,367	34
Simris	1,709	1,398	42.6	56.5	82	87	13	25,250	36
Simrishamn C	1,672	1,412	48.5	50.0	74	73	27	19,960	31
Simrishamn N	2,110	1,742	44.5	54.3	79	84	16	22,799	38
Simrishamn S	2,012	1,531	42.9	53.9	68	74	26	19,605	30
Skillinge	1,100	978	37.8	61.3	78	92	8	23,596	43
Vitaby	1,119	966	47.9	50.8	78	89	11	23,103	46
Source: SVT

== Politics ==
The 2018 municipal election resulted in the following composition of the municipal council:

Party	Seats
Moderate Party	12
Social Democratic Party	11
Sweden Democrats	8
Centre Party	4
Liberals	3
Feminist Initiative	3
Green Party	2
Left Party	2
Christian Democrats	2
Österlen Party	2
Total	49

== International relations ==
=== Twin towns — Sister cities ===
The municipality is twinned with:

- (Germany) Barth
- (Denmark) Bornholm
- (Poland) Kołobrzeg
- (Lithuania) Palanga
