= Kivik =

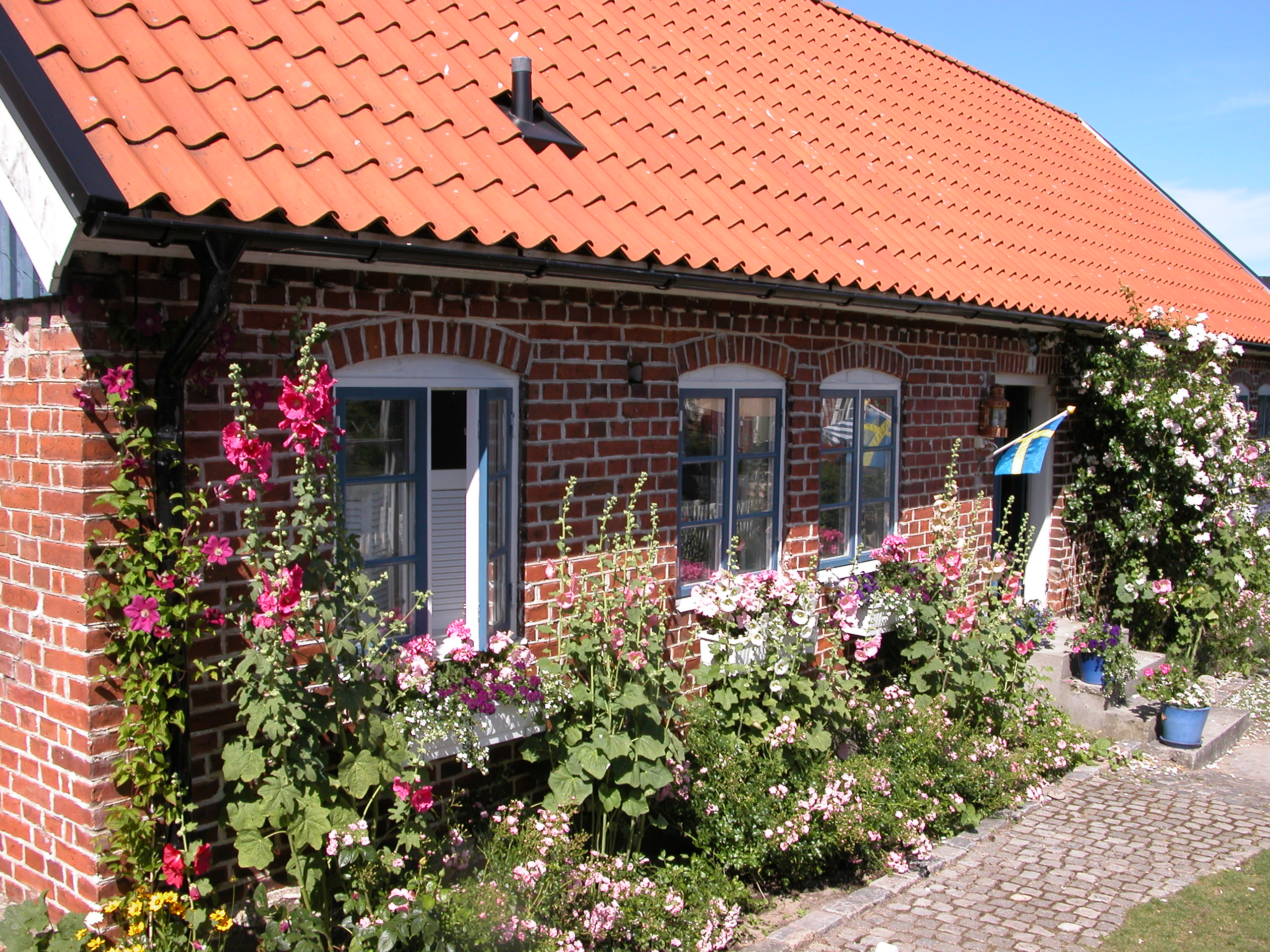
- A classic Kivik cottage

- Location within Skåne Location within Sweden
- Coordinates: 55°41′N 14°14′E
- Country: Sweden
- Province: Skåne
- County: Skåne County
- Municipality: Simrishamn Municipality

Area
  - Total: 1.25 km^{2} (0.48 sq mi)

Population (31 December 2010)
  - Total: 960
  - Density: 766/km^{2} (1,980/sq mi)
- Time zone: UTC+1 (CET)
  - Summer (DST): UTC+2 (CEST)

Kivik (Swedish pronunciation: [ˈɕǐːvɪk]) is a locality in Simrishamn Municipality, Skåne County, Sweden with 960 inhabitants in 2010. It is in a part of Scania (Skåne) called Österlen.

Kivik is known for its annual market, usually taking place on the third Monday through Wednesday of July each year. It's also known for its abundant production of herring, apples and apple cider, usually sold in large quantities at the market.

Kivik is the site of The King's Grave, a Bronze Age circular burial site, at 75 metres in diameter the largest in Sweden.

The national park of Stenshuvud is to the south of the village.

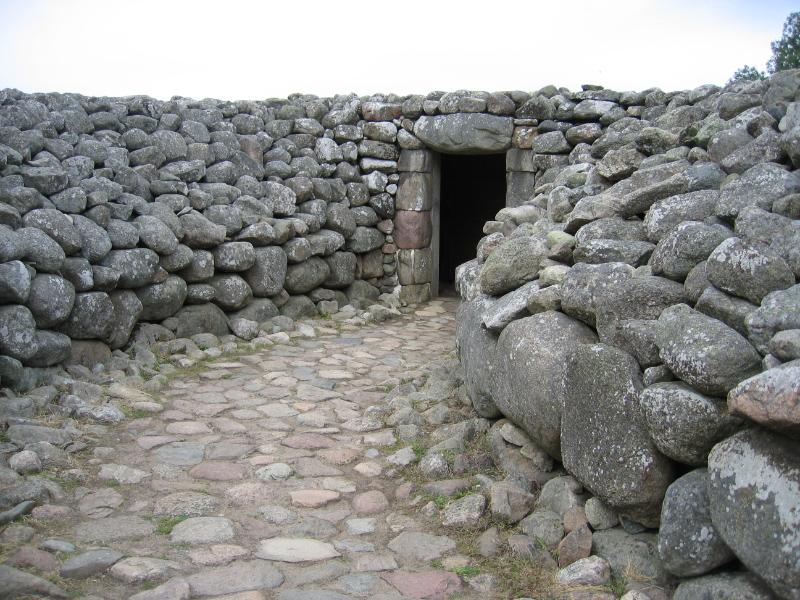
Kungagraven in Kivik
