= Östra Tommarp =

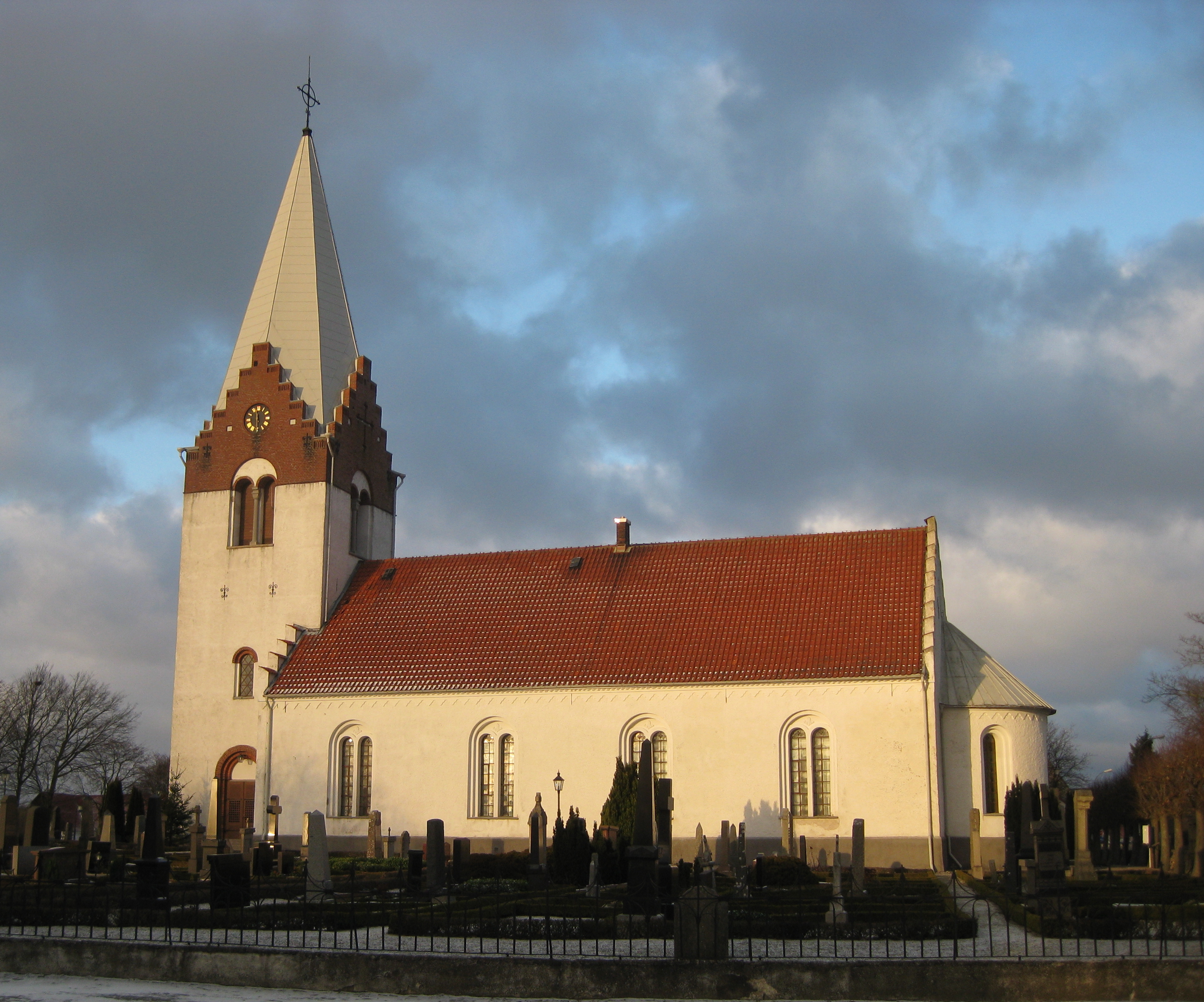
- Östra Tommarp church

- Location within Skåne Location within Sweden
- Coordinates: 55°32′N 14°14′E
- Country: Sweden
- Province: Skåne
- County: Skåne County
- Municipality: Simrishamn Municipality

Area
  - Total: 0.49 km^{2} (0.19 sq mi)

Population (31 December 2010)
  - Total: 284
  - Density: 575/km^{2} (1,490/sq mi)
- Time zone: UTC+1 (CET)
  - Summer (DST): UTC+2 (CEST)

Östra Tommarp (Swedish pronunciation: [ˈœ̌sːtra ˈtʊ̂mːarp]) is a locality situated in Simrishamn Municipality, Skåne County, Sweden with 284 inhabitants in 2010.
