= Vik, Sweden =

Vik
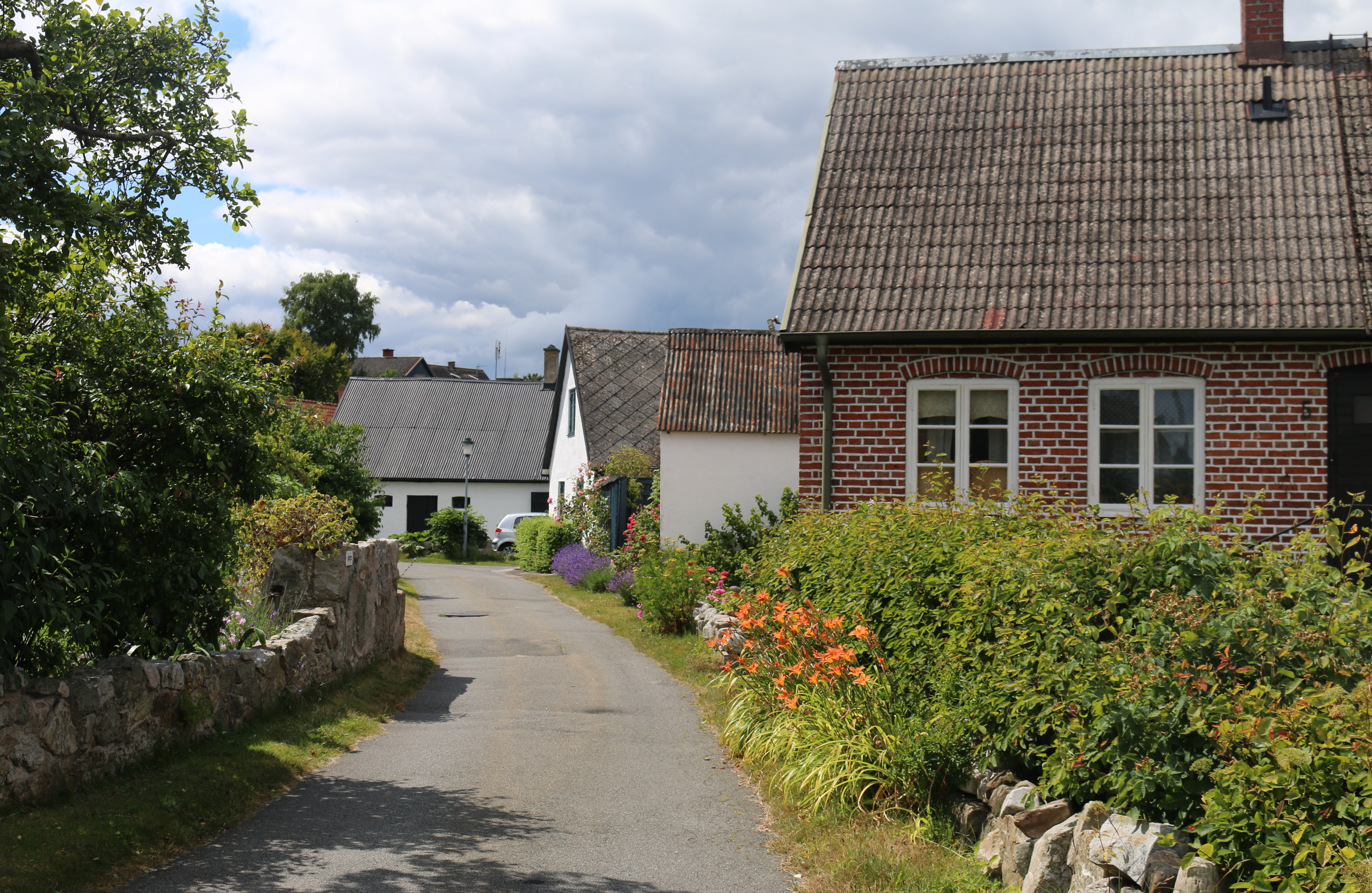

- Location within Skåne Location within Sweden
- Coordinates: 55°37′N 14°17′E
- Country: Sweden
- Province: Skåne
- County: Skåne County
- Municipality: Simrishamn Municipality

Area
  - Total: 0.61 km^{2} (0.24 sq mi)

Population (31 December 2010)
  - Total: 322
  - Density: 526/km^{2} (1,360/sq mi)
- Time zone: UTC+1 (CET)
  - Summer (DST): UTC+2 (CEST)

Vik is a locality situated in Simrishamn Municipality, Skåne County, Sweden with 322 inhabitants in 2010.
