= Simrishamn =

Place in Skåne, Sweden

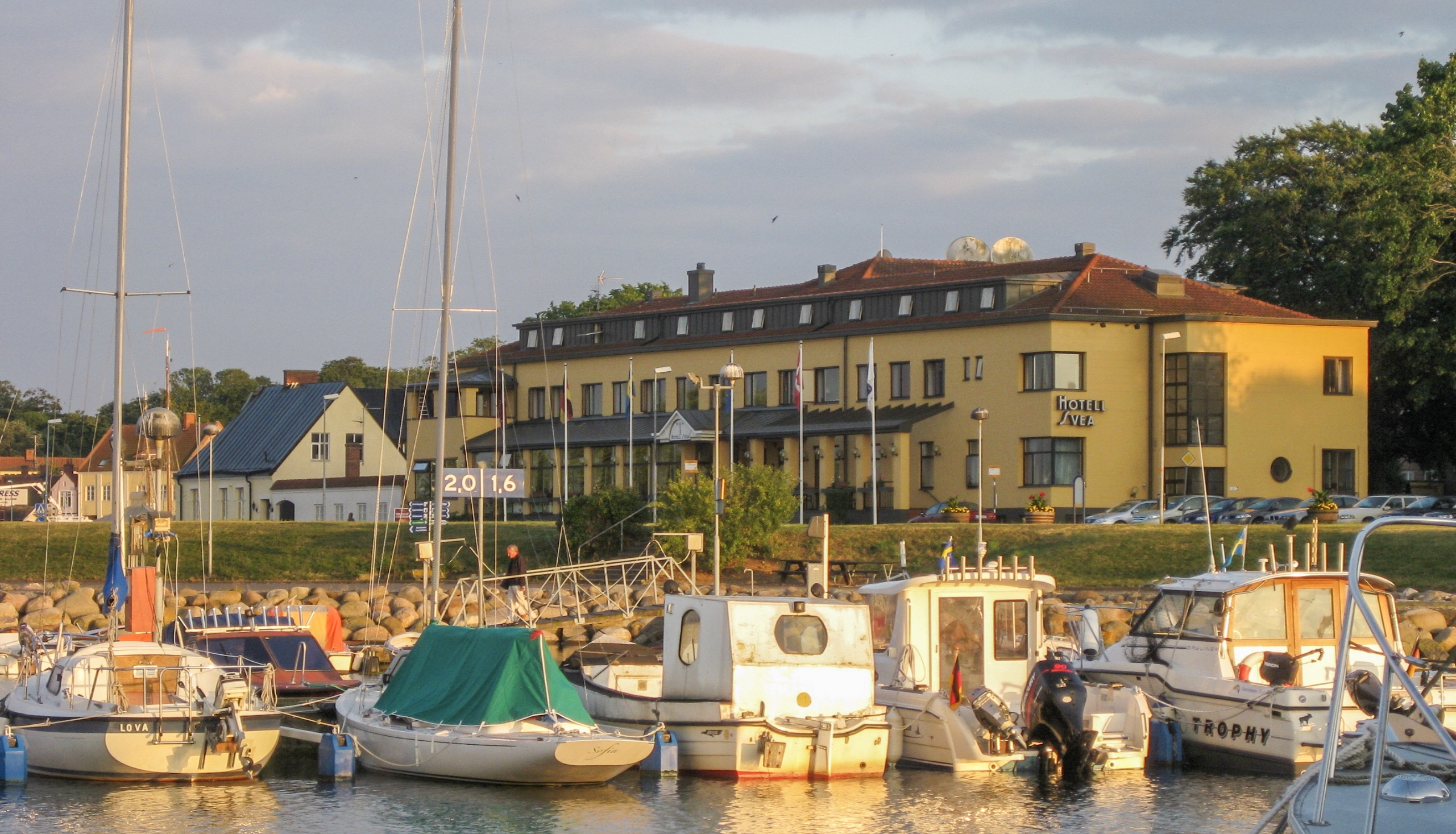
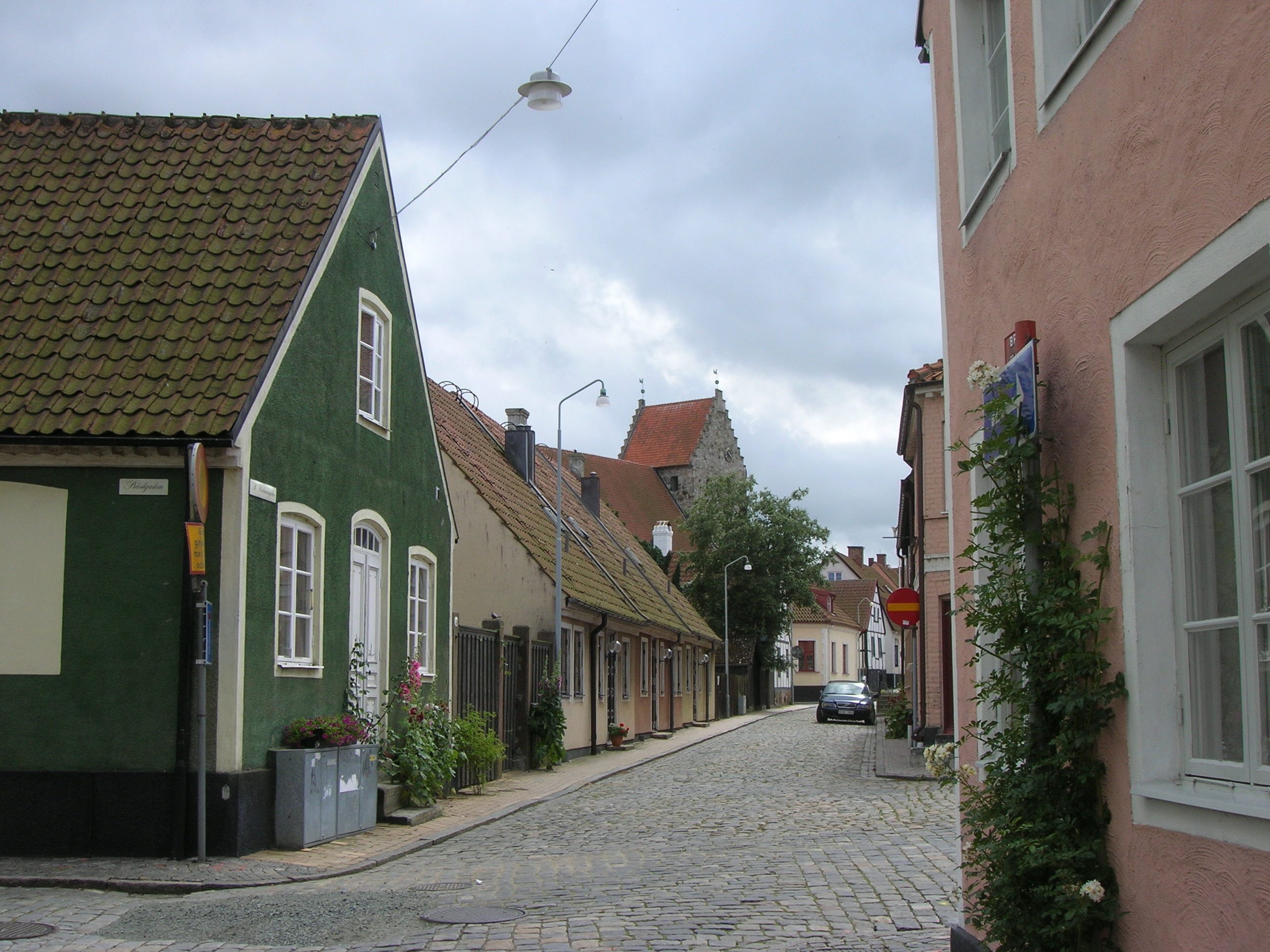
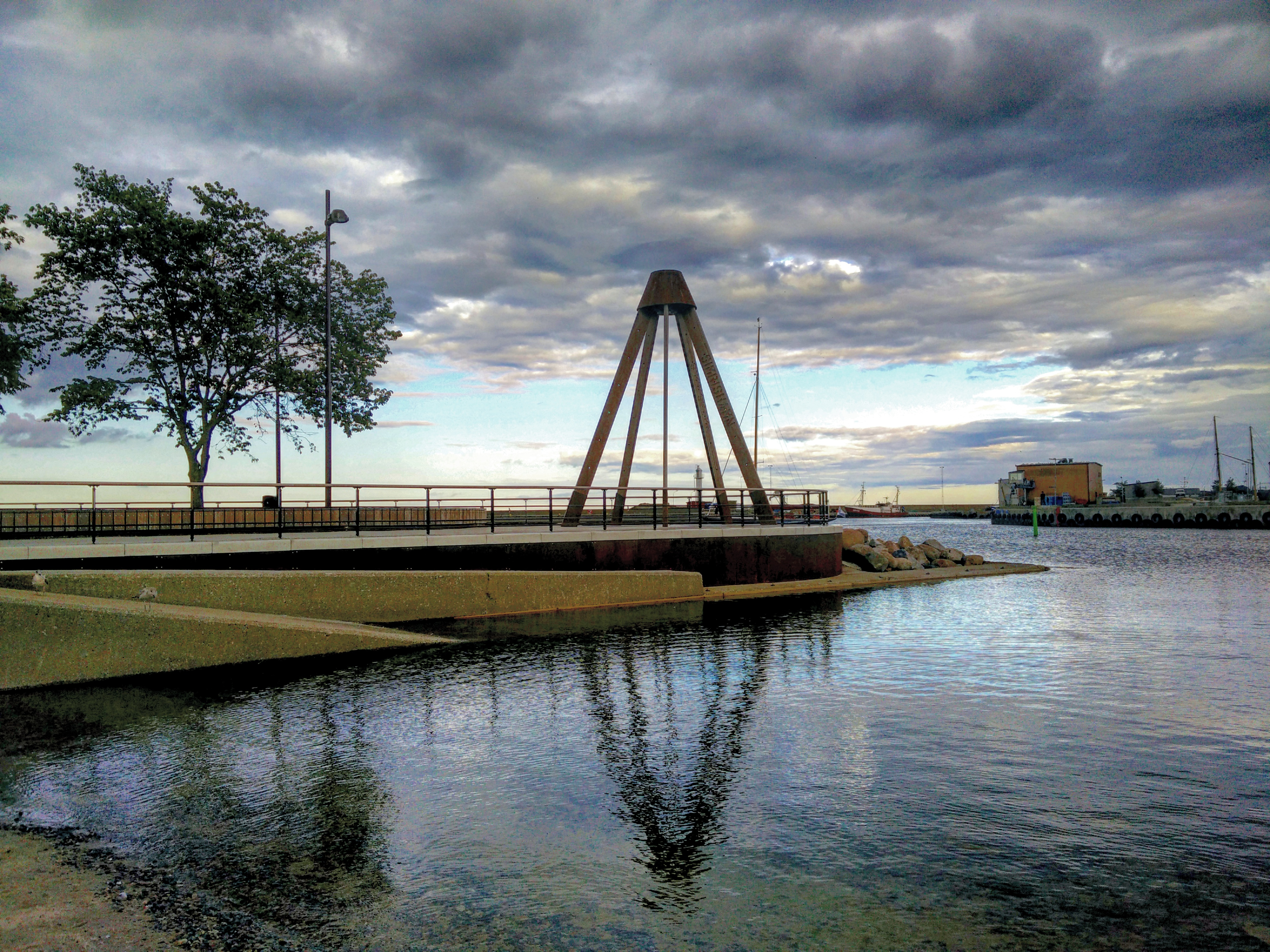

- Coat of arms

- Location within Skåne Location within Sweden
- Coordinates: 55°33′N 14°21′E
- Country: Sweden
- Province: Skåne
- County: Skåne County
- Municipality: Simrishamn Municipality

Area
  - Total: 4.49 km^{2} (1.73 sq mi)

Population (31 December 2010)
  - Total: 6,527
  - Density: 1,453/km^{2} (3,760/sq mi)
- Time zone: UTC+01:00 (CET)
  - Summer (DST): UTC+02:00 (CEST)

Simrishamn is a locality and the seat of Simrishamn Municipality, Skåne County, Sweden with 6,527 inhabitants in 2010. Despite its small population, Simrishamn is, for historical reasons, usually still referred to as a city.

Simrishamn is a picturesque coastal town, built around the main street (Storgatan) that passes the market square, itself being the centre of the town. The climate of Simrishamn is mild, because it is warmed by the Gulf Stream and the Baltic Sea, and the hardiness zone of Simrishamn is 8a, comparable to Paris, France.

== History ==
Simrishamn is first mentioned (as Symbrishafn) in 1161 and as a town in 1361. Simris has been interpreted as "at the mouth of the slow-flowing (river)" and hamn as "port or harbour", meaning present-day Tommarpsån. It has been speculated that the name has something to do with the Cimbri, a Germanic tribe, as the name also has been "Cimbrishavn". In 1658, when Scania under the Treaty of Roskilde was permanently transferred from Denmark to Sweden, the town had a population of about 200 people. The growth was relatively small until about 1810 when it reached 700 inhabitants, growing to 1,365 in 1850 and 1,966 in 1890. The local government reform of 1971 made Simrishamn the seat of Simrishamn Municipality with about 20,000 inhabitants.

Simrishamn received its railway station with the opening of the Simrishamn-Tomelilla Line in 1892. This line connected Simrishamn to the Ystad-Eslöv Line at Tomelilla. In 1997, the Skåne Commuter Rail was extended to Simrishamn, further integrating the town into the regional rail network

== Climate ==
The nearest station to Simrishamn is in Skillinge 10 kilometres (6.2 mi) further down the coastline, also on the open sea. Skillinge has a maritime climate with a moderated coastline and a slightly warmer interior during summers. Österlen has a drier climate than elsewhere in Southern Sweden, although it has no active weather station measuring sunshine. Even so, the cool temperatures of the Baltic Sea keeps the immediate coastline on average a couple of degrees cooler during July days than in places further north in the country or the western part of Skåne. This is due to the dominance of water in the surroundings, whereas the Mälar valley around Stockholm is surrounded by more land.

Especially during summer, seasonal lag is strong on the local coastline. This means that August averages the warmest summer nights and that September is a lot warmer than May as the sea water gradually warms. During winter, this maritime proximity of Österlen reverses the climate patterns and leads to average highs above 3 °C (37 °F) on the coastline and frosts usually being weak even while frequent. Records for Skillinge began in 1995 and as such do not contain likely historical extremes. Simrishamn had an active weather station from 1951 that closed in 1996.

Climate data for Skillinge; 10 kilometres (6.2 mi) south of Simrishamn (2002–2021 averages, extremes since 1995)
Month	Jan	Feb	Mar	Apr	May	Jun	Jul	Aug	Sep	Oct	Nov	Dec	Year
Record high °C (°F)	11.2 (52.2)	13.4 (56.1)	19.5 (67.1)	21.9 (71.4)	25.6 (78.1)	31.1 (88.0)	30.5 (86.9)	32.0 (89.6)	26.9 (80.4)	20.9 (69.6)	16.8 (62.2)	12.0 (53.6)	32.0 (89.6)
Mean maximum °C (°F)	7.7 (45.9)	8.0 (46.4)	12.3 (54.1)	16.7 (62.1)	21.4 (70.5)	25.7 (78.3)	26.4 (79.5)	25.8 (78.4)	22.6 (72.7)	16.9 (62.4)	12.4 (54.3)	9.0 (48.2)	28.3 (82.9)
Mean daily maximum °C (°F)	3.3 (37.9)	3.3 (37.9)	5.8 (42.4)	9.7 (49.5)	14.3 (57.7)	19.1 (66.4)	21.5 (70.7)	21.0 (69.8)	17.6 (63.7)	12.4 (54.3)	8.3 (46.9)	5.1 (41.2)	11.8 (53.2)
Daily mean °C (°F)	1.3 (34.3)	1.2 (34.2)	3.1 (37.6)	6.4 (43.5)	10.6 (51.1)	15.0 (59.0)	17.5 (63.5)	17.5 (63.5)	14.4 (57.9)	9.9 (49.8)	6.3 (43.3)	3.1 (37.6)	8.9 (47.9)
Mean daily minimum °C (°F)	−0.8 (30.6)	−0.9 (30.4)	0.3 (32.5)	3.0 (37.4)	6.9 (44.4)	10.9 (51.6)	13.5 (56.3)	14.0 (57.2)	11.1 (52.0)	7.3 (45.1)	4.2 (39.6)	1.0 (33.8)	5.9 (42.6)
Mean minimum °C (°F)	−9.6 (14.7)	−7.1 (19.2)	−5.7 (21.7)	−2.0 (28.4)	0.9 (33.6)	5.7 (42.3)	9.0 (48.2)	8.5 (47.3)	5.4 (41.7)	0.3 (32.5)	−3.0 (26.6)	−6.3 (20.7)	−11.1 (12.0)
Record low °C (°F)	−16.8 (1.8)	−14.6 (5.7)	−16.1 (3.0)	−4.8 (23.4)	−1.5 (29.3)	2.1 (35.8)	7.0 (44.6)	6.0 (42.8)	2.9 (37.2)	−5.9 (21.4)	−7.1 (19.2)	−17.7 (0.1)	−17.7 (0.1)
Average precipitation mm (inches)	52.4 (2.06)	33.5 (1.32)	31.2 (1.23)	22.8 (0.90)	36.0 (1.42)	43.8 (1.72)	57.1 (2.25)	61.0 (2.40)	42.3 (1.67)	67.1 (2.64)	59.3 (2.33)	52.9 (2.08)	559.4 (22.02)
Source 1: SMHI Open Data for Skillinge A, precipitation
Source 2: SMHI Open Data for Skillinge A, temperature

== Gallery ==
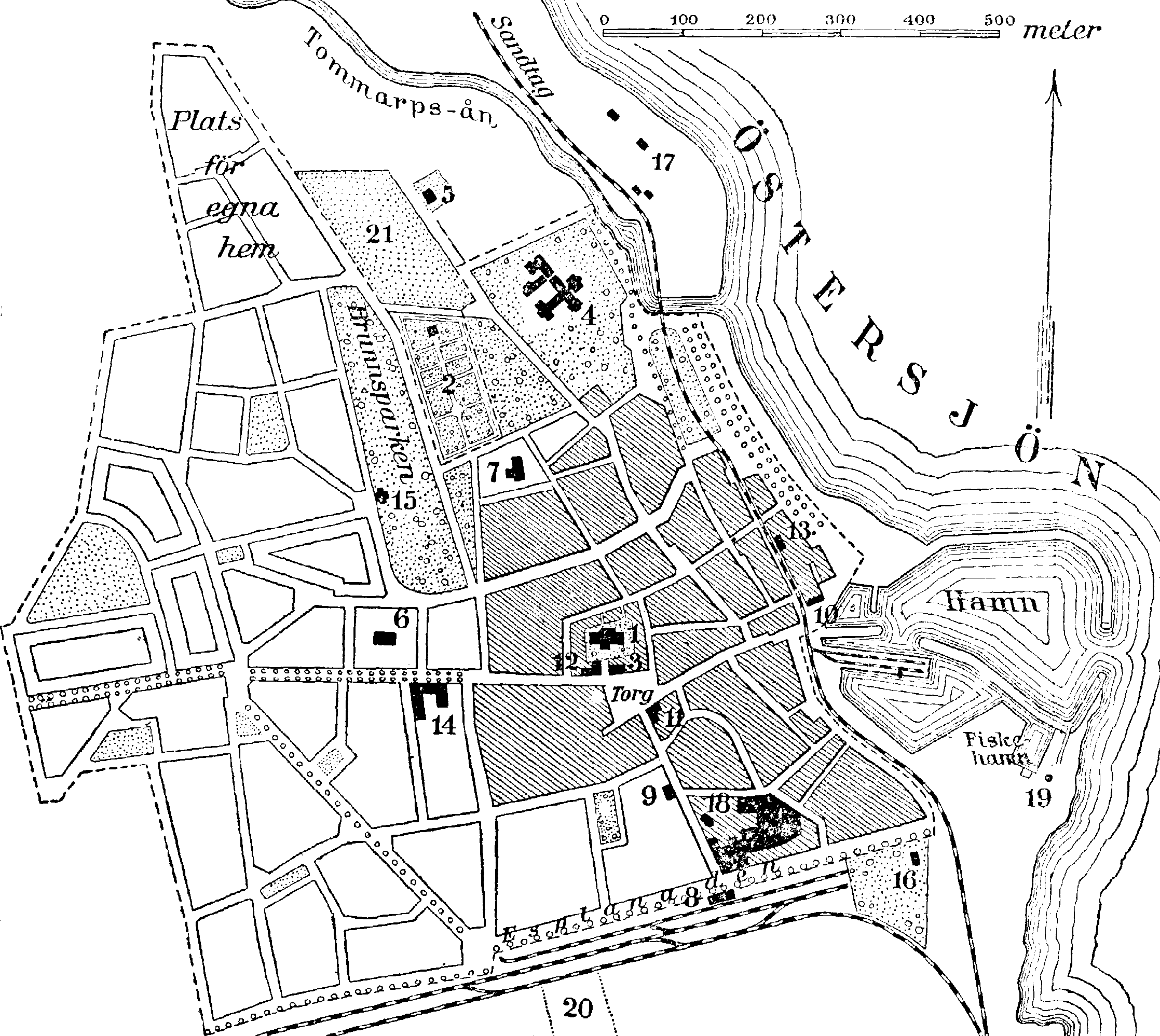
Street plan, before 1917

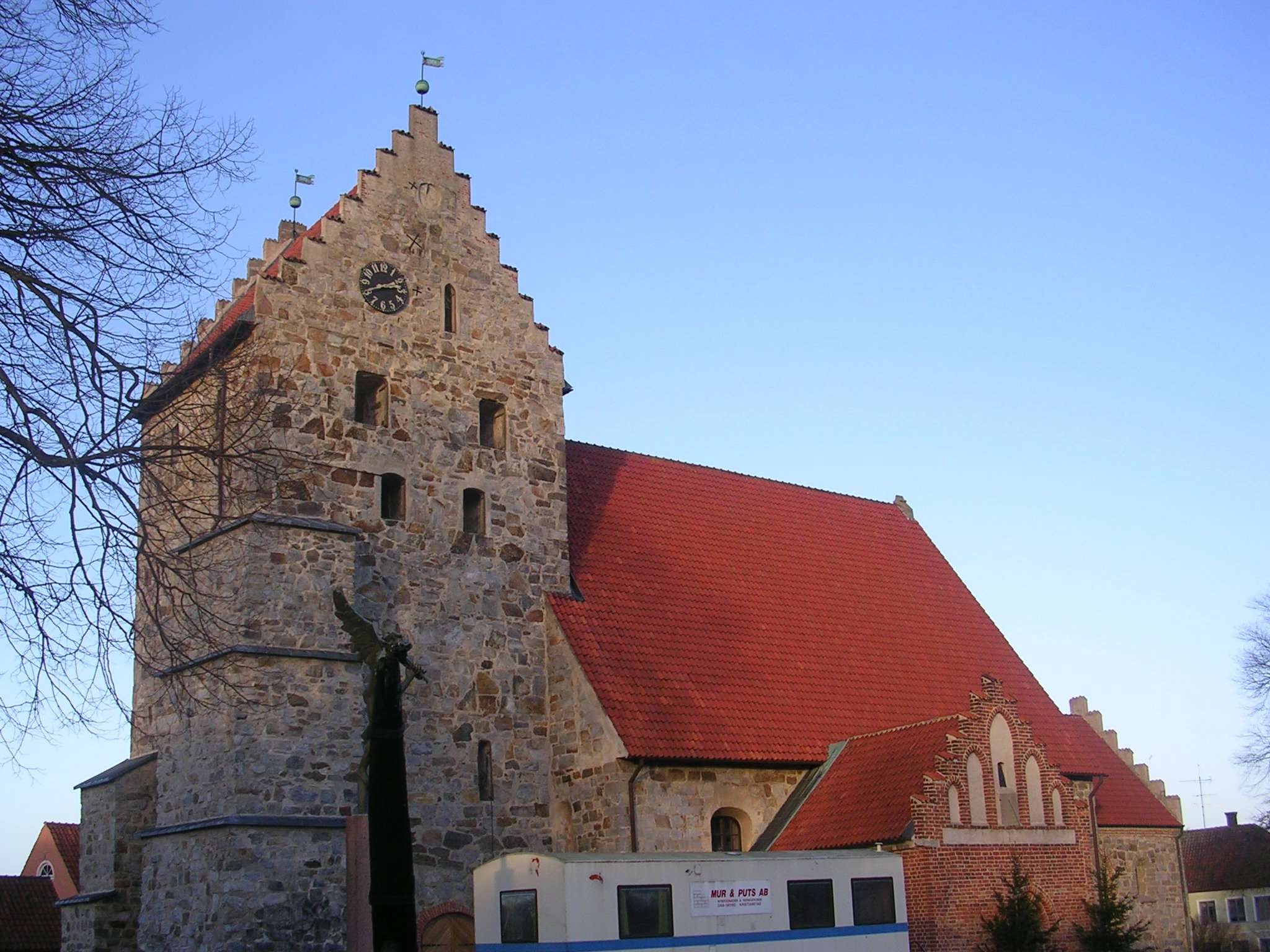
Saint Nicolai Church, a medieval church in central Simrishamn

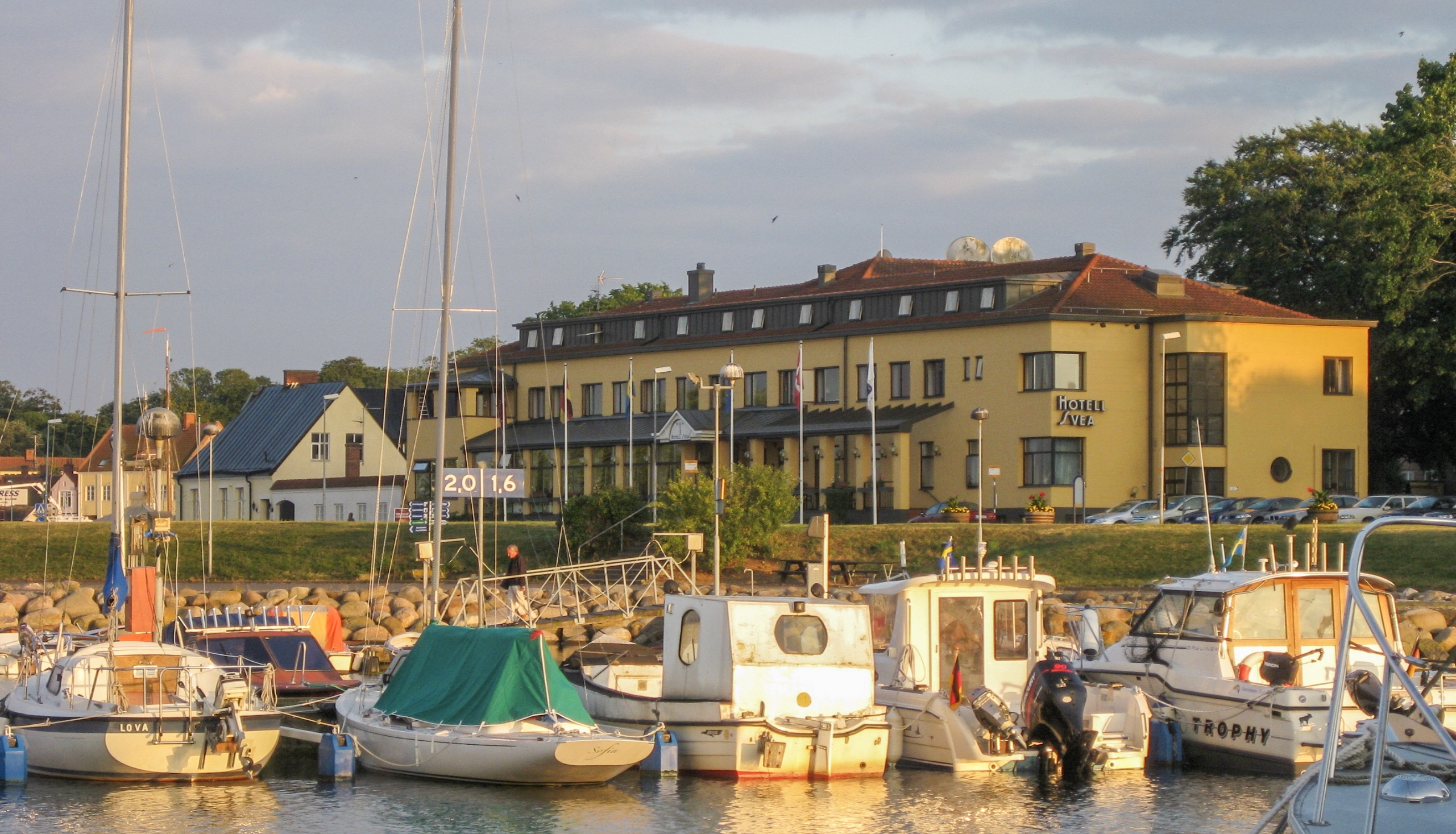
Harbour

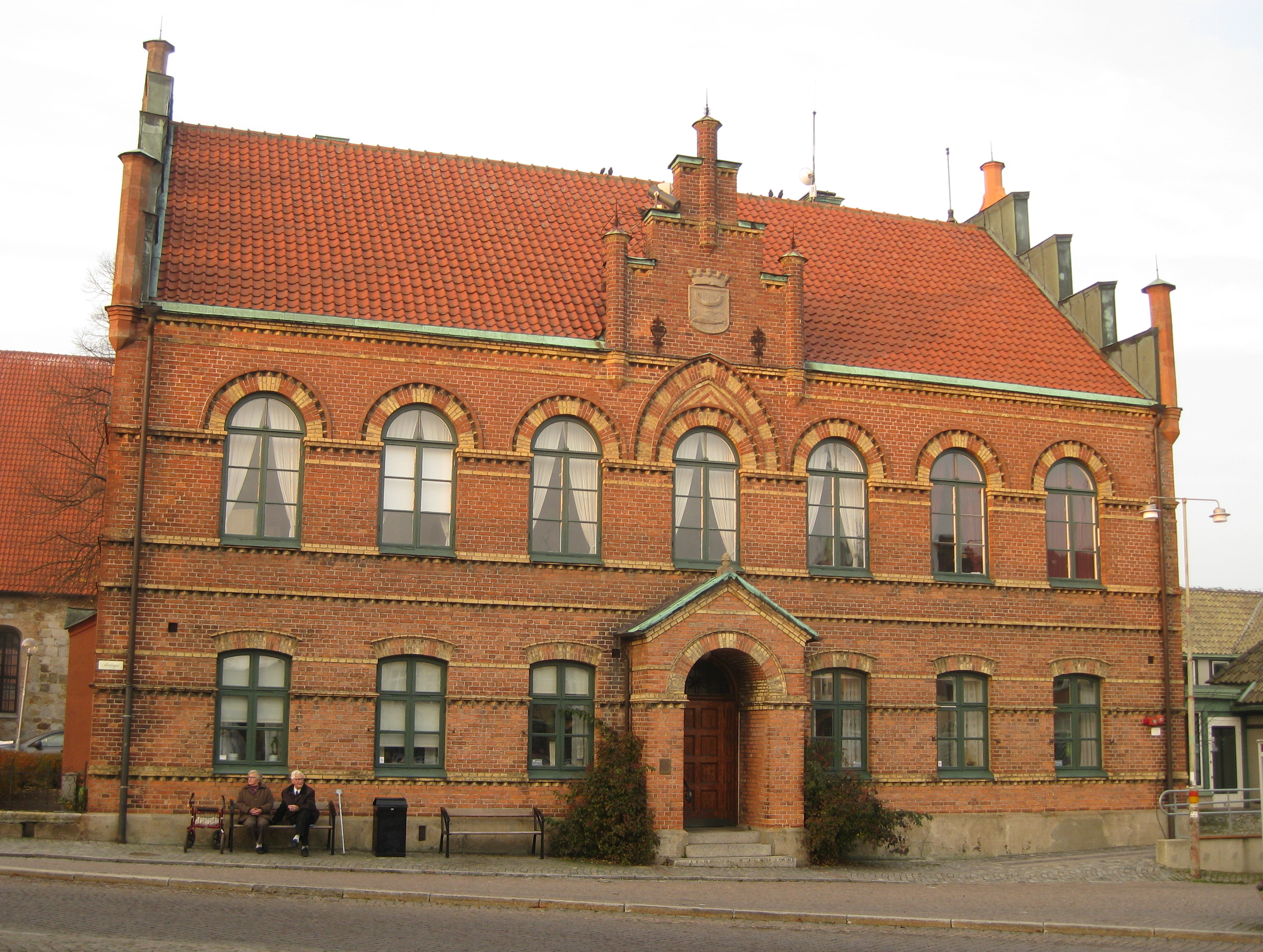
Old town hall

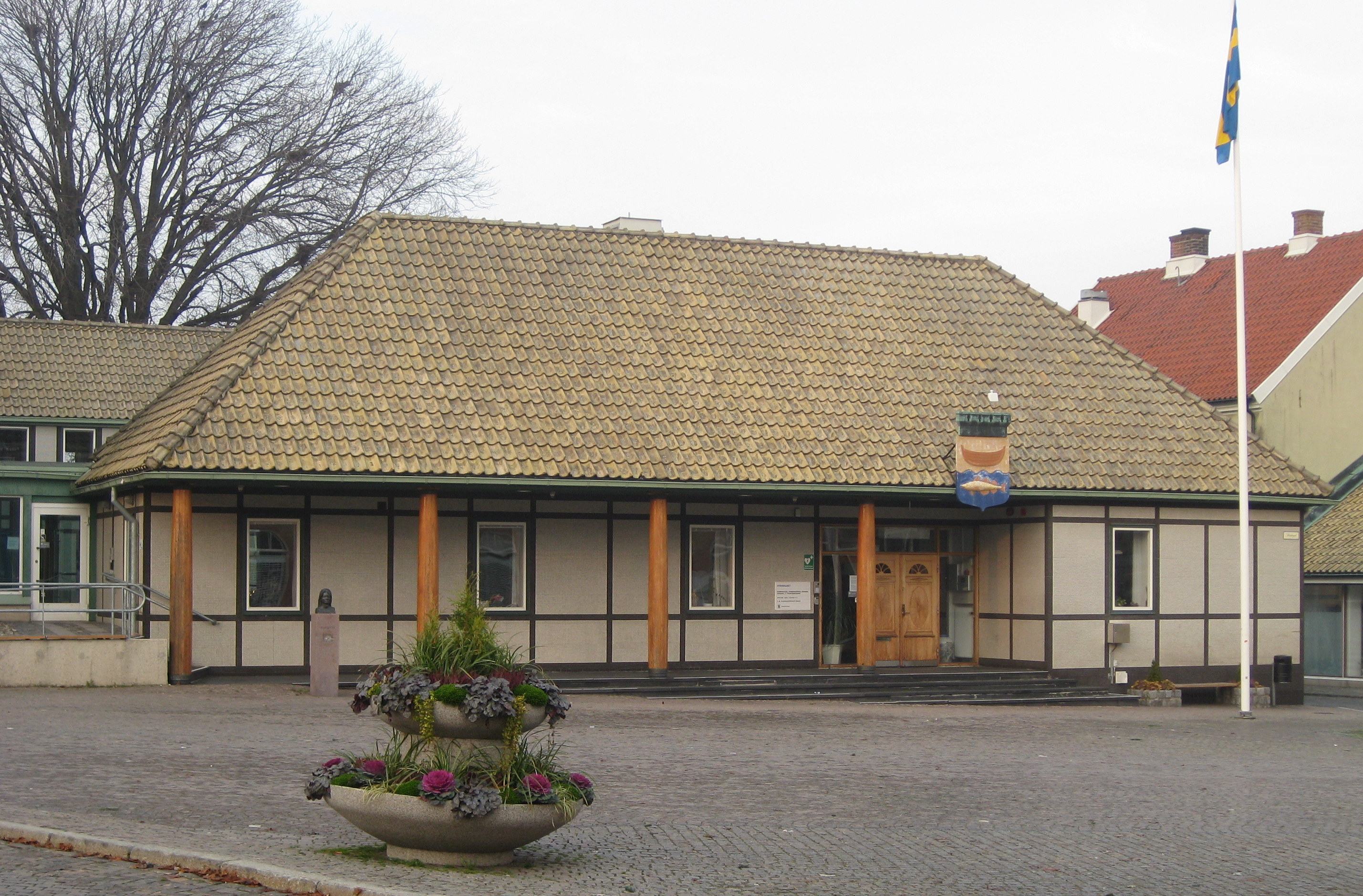
New town hall

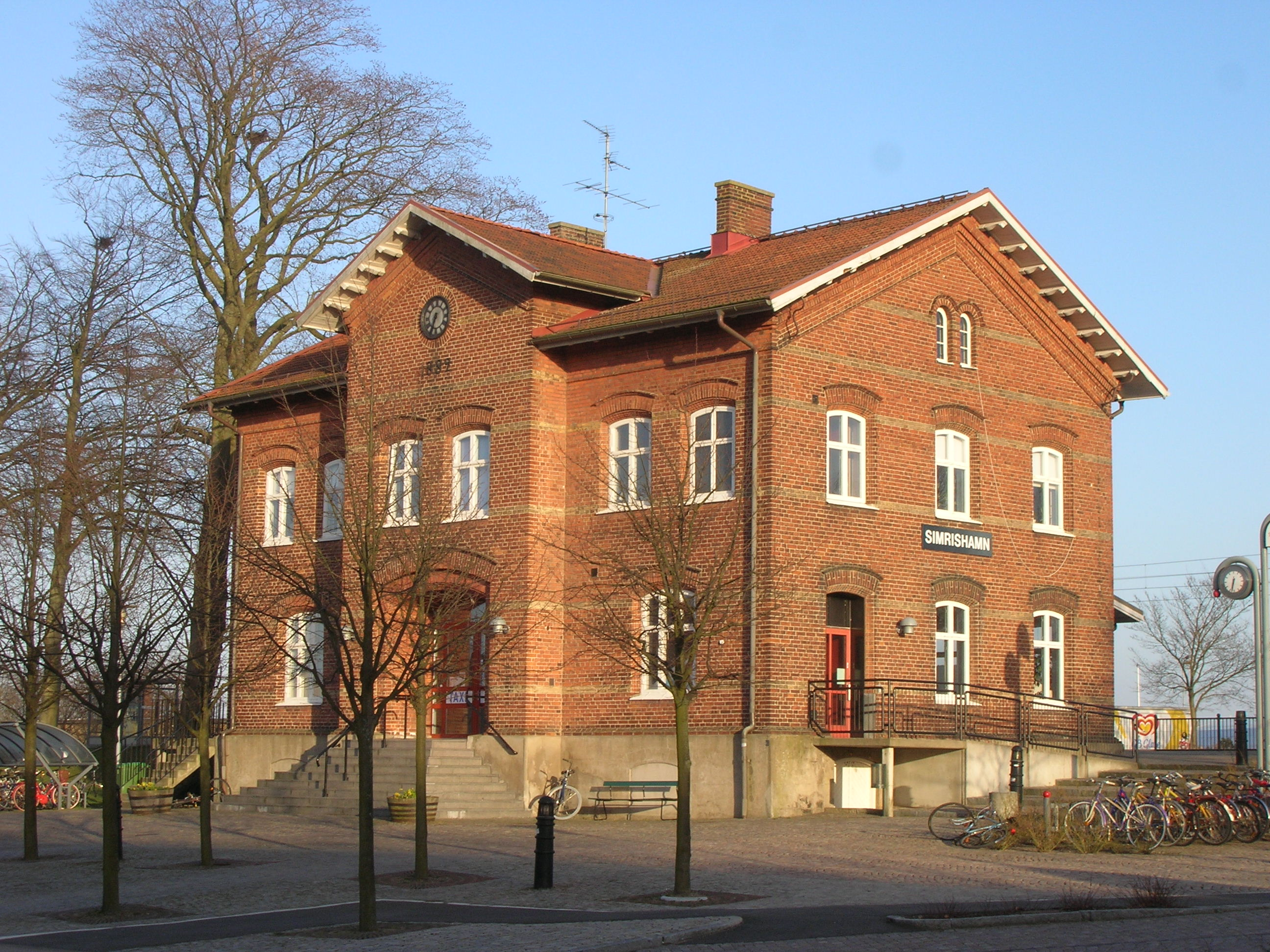
Railway station

== See also ==
- Simris Runestones
