= Hammenhög =

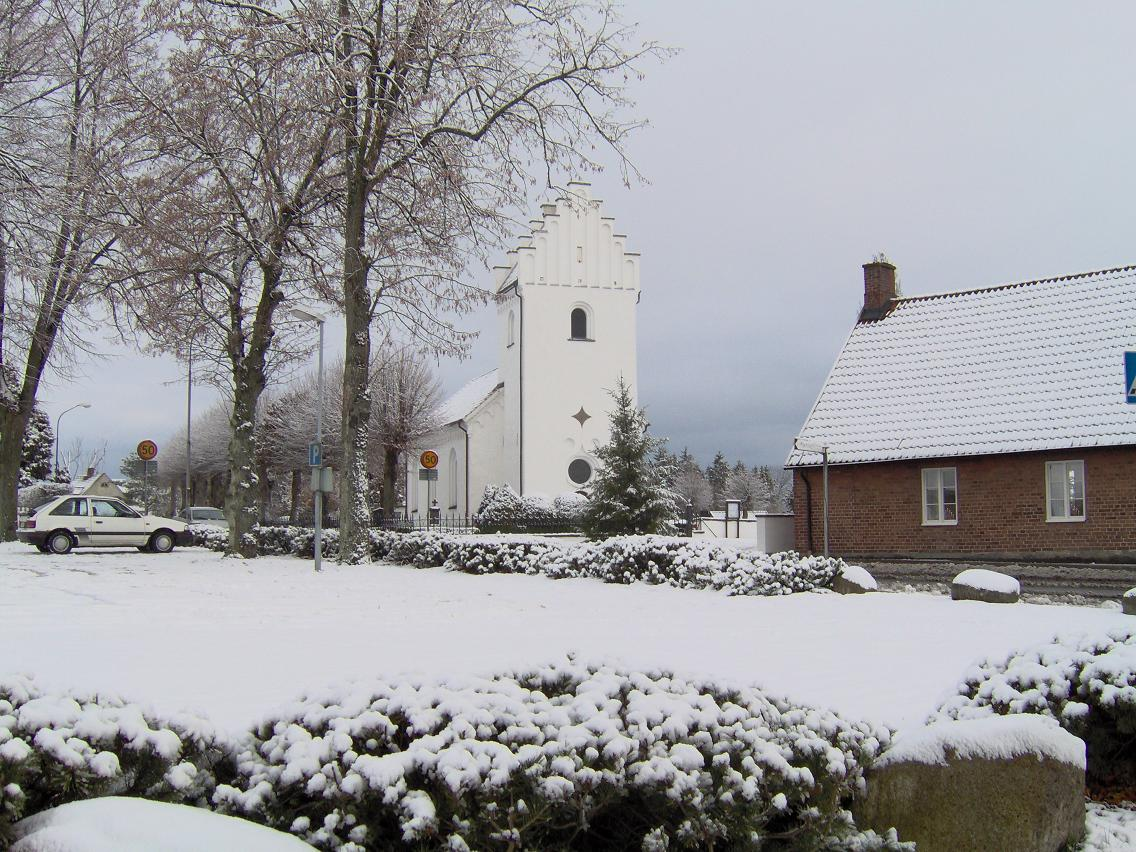
- Hammenhög Church

- Location within Skåne Location within Sweden
- Coordinates: 55°30′N 14°09′E
- Country: Sweden
- Province: Skåne
- County: Skåne County
- Municipality: Simrishamn Municipality

Area
  - Total: 1.04 km^{2} (0.40 sq mi)

Population (31 December 2010)
  - Total: 908
  - Density: 872/km^{2} (2,260/sq mi)
- Time zone: UTC+1 (CET)
  - Summer (DST): UTC+2 (CEST)

Hammenhög is a locality situated in Simrishamn Municipality, Skåne County, Sweden with 908 inhabitants in 2010.

The village is named after a Bronze-Age grave, the first part of the name, Hammen-, refers to a person named Haming or Hamund, the second part, -hög, from the Old Norse word Haugr, means mound or barrow.
