= Gärsnäs =

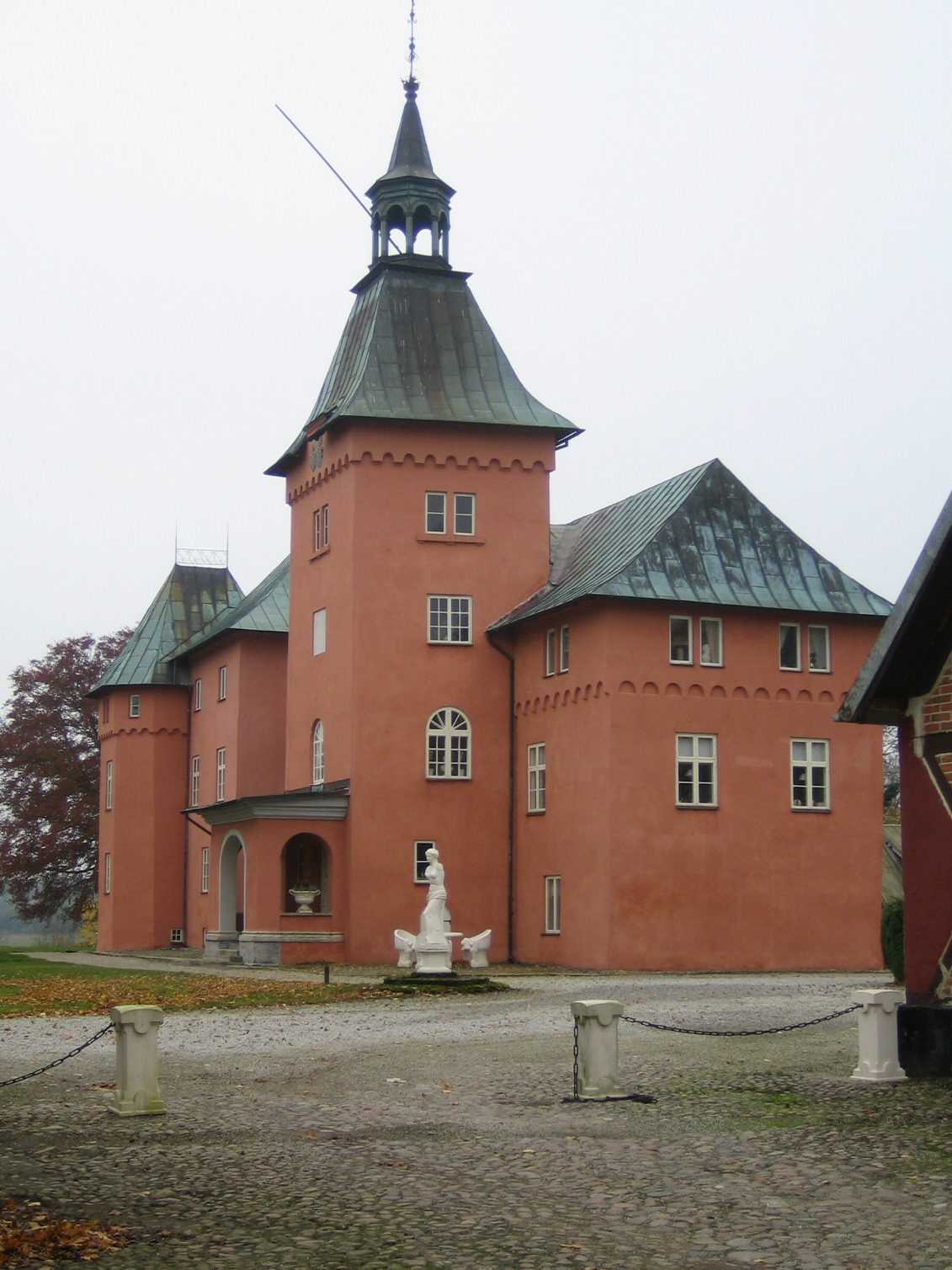
- Gärsnäs Castle

- Location within Skåne Location within Sweden
- Coordinates: 55°33′N 14°11′E
- Country: Sweden
- Province: Skåne
- County: Skåne County
- Municipality: Simrishamn Municipality

Area
  - Total: 0.99 km^{2} (0.38 sq mi)

Population (31 December 2010)
  - Total: 1,000
  - Density: 1,010/km^{2} (2,600/sq mi)
- Time zone: UTC+1 (CET)
  - Summer (DST): UTC+2 (CEST)

Gärsnäs (Swedish pronunciation: [ˈjæ̌ʂːnɛs]) is a locality situated in Simrishamn Municipality, Skåne County, Sweden with 1,000 inhabitants in 2010.
