= Skillinge =

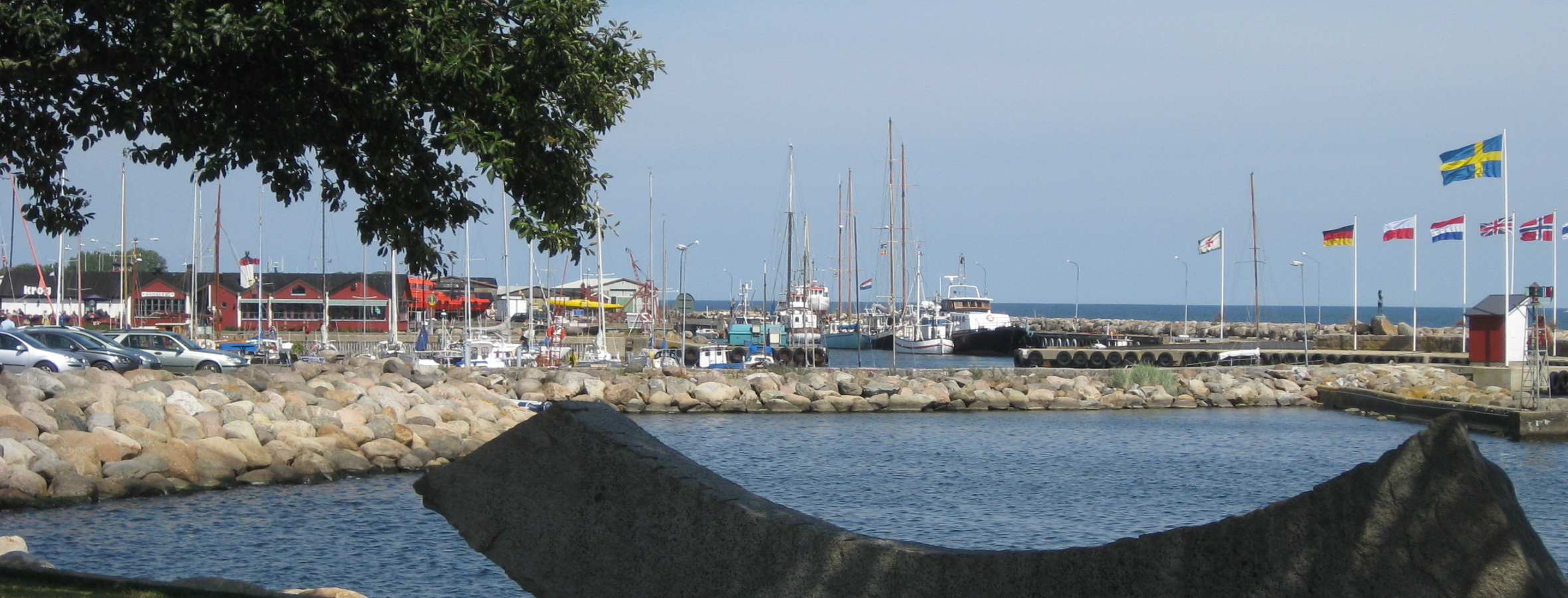

- Location within Skåne Location within Sweden
- Coordinates: 55°28′N 14°17′E
- Country: Sweden
- Province: Skåne
- County: Skåne County
- Municipality: Simrishamn Municipality

Area
  - Total: 0.87 km^{2} (0.34 sq mi)

Population (31 December 2010)
  - Total: 859
  - Density: 991/km^{2} (2,570/sq mi)
- Time zone: UTC+1 (CET)
  - Summer (DST): UTC+2 (CEST)

Skillinge is a locality situated in Simrishamn Municipality, in Österlen, Skåne County, Sweden, with 859 inhabitants in 2010.

== The village ==
Skillinge has a combined marina and a fishing port which is the closest one to the north of the treacherous Sandhammaren peninsula. In Skillinge harbor there is a shipyard and a SSRS rescue station equipped with the class nameing rescue vessel Rescue Gad Rausing carrying a Rescuerunner. The harbor is also the home port of the k-marked schooner Klara Marie. In the town's former school building from 1858 is the Skillinge maritime museum. Skillinge theatre is well established and widely known for its plays.

== Climate ==
Skillinge has a maritime climate with a moderated coastline and a slightly warmer interior during summers. Österlen has a drier climate than elsewhere in Southern Sweden, although it has no active weather station measuring sunshine. Even so, the cool temperatures of the Baltic Sea keeps the immediate coastline on average a couple of degrees cooler during July days than in places further north in the country. This is due to the dominance of water in the surroundings, whereas the Mälar valley around Stockholm is surrounded by more land.

Especially during summer, seasonal lag is strong on the local coastline. This means that August averages the warmest summer nights and that September is a lot warmer than May as the sea water gradually warms. During winter, this maritime proximity of Österlen reverses the climate patterns and leads to average highs above 3 °C (37 °F) on the coastline and frosts usually being weak even while frequent. Records for Skillinge began in 1995 and as such do not contain likely historical extremes.

Climate data for Skillinge (2002–2021 averages, extremes since 1995)
Month	Jan	Feb	Mar	Apr	May	Jun	Jul	Aug	Sep	Oct	Nov	Dec	Year
Record high °C (°F)	11.2 (52.2)	13.4 (56.1)	19.5 (67.1)	21.9 (71.4)	25.6 (78.1)	31.1 (88.0)	30.5 (86.9)	32.0 (89.6)	29.0 (84.2)	20.9 (69.6)	16.8 (62.2)	12.0 (53.6)	32.0 (89.6)
Mean maximum °C (°F)	7.7 (45.9)	8.0 (46.4)	12.3 (54.1)	16.7 (62.1)	21.4 (70.5)	25.7 (78.3)	26.4 (79.5)	25.8 (78.4)	22.6 (72.7)	16.9 (62.4)	12.4 (54.3)	9.0 (48.2)	28.3 (82.9)
Mean daily maximum °C (°F)	3.3 (37.9)	3.3 (37.9)	5.8 (42.4)	9.7 (49.5)	14.3 (57.7)	19.1 (66.4)	21.5 (70.7)	21.0 (69.8)	17.6 (63.7)	12.4 (54.3)	8.3 (46.9)	5.1 (41.2)	11.8 (53.2)
Daily mean °C (°F)	1.3 (34.3)	1.2 (34.2)	3.1 (37.6)	6.4 (43.5)	10.6 (51.1)	15.0 (59.0)	17.5 (63.5)	17.5 (63.5)	14.4 (57.9)	9.9 (49.8)	6.3 (43.3)	3.1 (37.6)	8.9 (47.9)
Mean daily minimum °C (°F)	−0.8 (30.6)	−0.9 (30.4)	0.3 (32.5)	3.0 (37.4)	6.9 (44.4)	10.9 (51.6)	13.5 (56.3)	14.0 (57.2)	11.1 (52.0)	7.3 (45.1)	4.2 (39.6)	1.0 (33.8)	5.9 (42.6)
Mean minimum °C (°F)	−9.6 (14.7)	−7.1 (19.2)	−5.7 (21.7)	−2.0 (28.4)	0.9 (33.6)	5.7 (42.3)	9.0 (48.2)	8.5 (47.3)	5.4 (41.7)	0.3 (32.5)	−3.0 (26.6)	−6.3 (20.7)	−11.1 (12.0)
Record low °C (°F)	−16.8 (1.8)	−14.6 (5.7)	−16.1 (3.0)	−4.8 (23.4)	−1.5 (29.3)	2.1 (35.8)	7.0 (44.6)	6.0 (42.8)	2.9 (37.2)	−5.9 (21.4)	−7.1 (19.2)	−17.7 (0.1)	−17.7 (0.1)
Average precipitation mm (inches)	52.4 (2.06)	33.5 (1.32)	31.2 (1.23)	22.8 (0.90)	36.0 (1.42)	43.8 (1.72)	57.1 (2.25)	61.0 (2.40)	42.3 (1.67)	67.1 (2.64)	59.3 (2.33)	52.9 (2.08)	559.4 (22.02)
Source 1: SMHI Open Data for Skillinge A, precipitation
Source 2: SMHI Open Data for Skillinge A, temperature
