= Borrby =

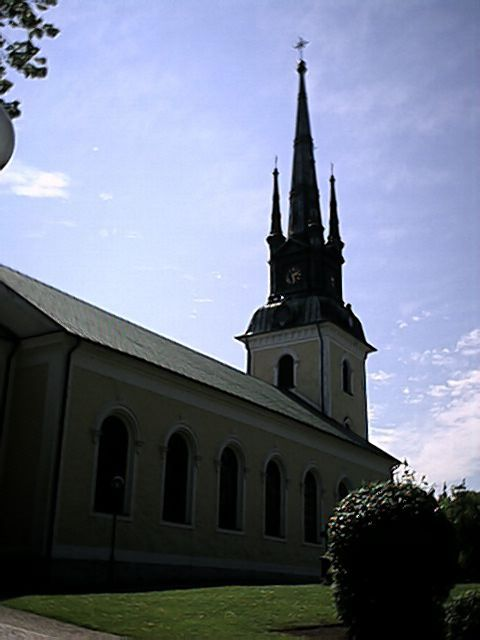
- Borrby Church

- Location within Skåne Location within Sweden
- Coordinates: 55°27′25.2″N 14°10′48″E
- Country: Sweden
- Province: Skåne
- County: Skåne County
- Municipality: Simrishamn Municipality

Area
  - Total: 0.88 km^{2} (0.34 sq mi)

Population (31 December 2010)
  - Total: 930
  - Density: 1,055/km^{2} (2,730/sq mi)
- Time zone: UTC+1 (CET)
  - Summer (DST): UTC+2 (CEST)
- Website: Borrby.se

Borrby is a locality situated in Simrishamn Municipality, Skåne County, Sweden with 930 inhabitants in 2010. It is a designated book town, due to the high number of bookshops in the vicinity.
