= Baskemölla =

Swedish locality

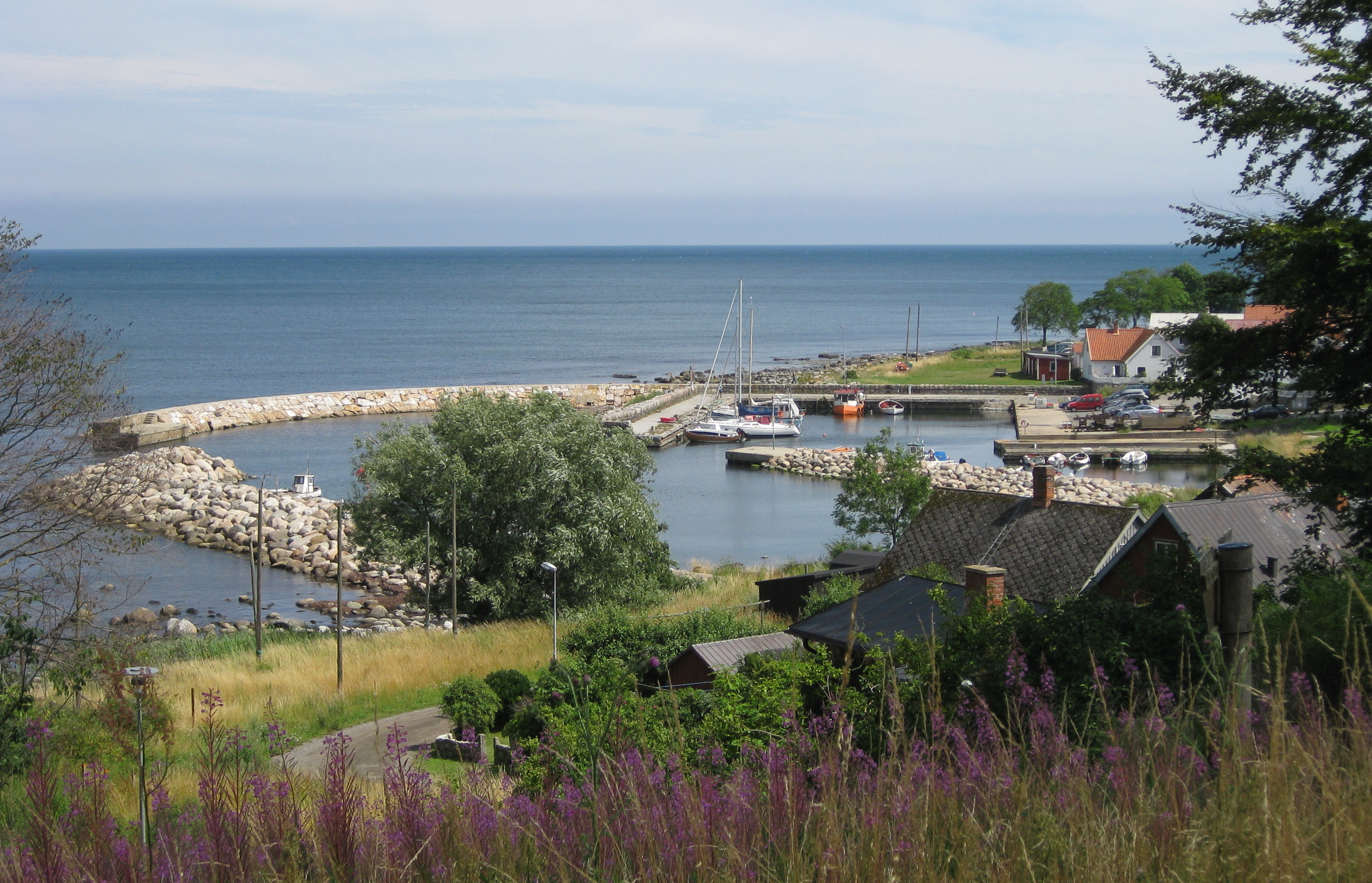
- Baskemölla harbour

- Location within Skåne Location within Sweden
- Coordinates: 55°36′N 14°18′E
- Country: Sweden
- Province: Skåne
- County: Skåne County
- Municipality: Simrishamn Municipality

Area
  - Total: 0.36 km^{2} (0.14 sq mi)

Population (2005-12-31)
  - Total: 238
  - Density: 664/km^{2} (1,720/sq mi)
- Time zone: UTC+1 (CET)
  - Summer (DST): UTC+2 (CEST)

Baskemölla is a locality situated in Simrishamn Municipality, Skåne County, Sweden with 238 inhabitants as of 2005.

Tjörnedala is an exhibition space there with frequent art shows, and a small cafe. There is also a nature trail behind this farm house, leading down to the water. Every Midsummer Day, there is a folk dance celebration on the hill behind the farm house.
