= Smedstorp =

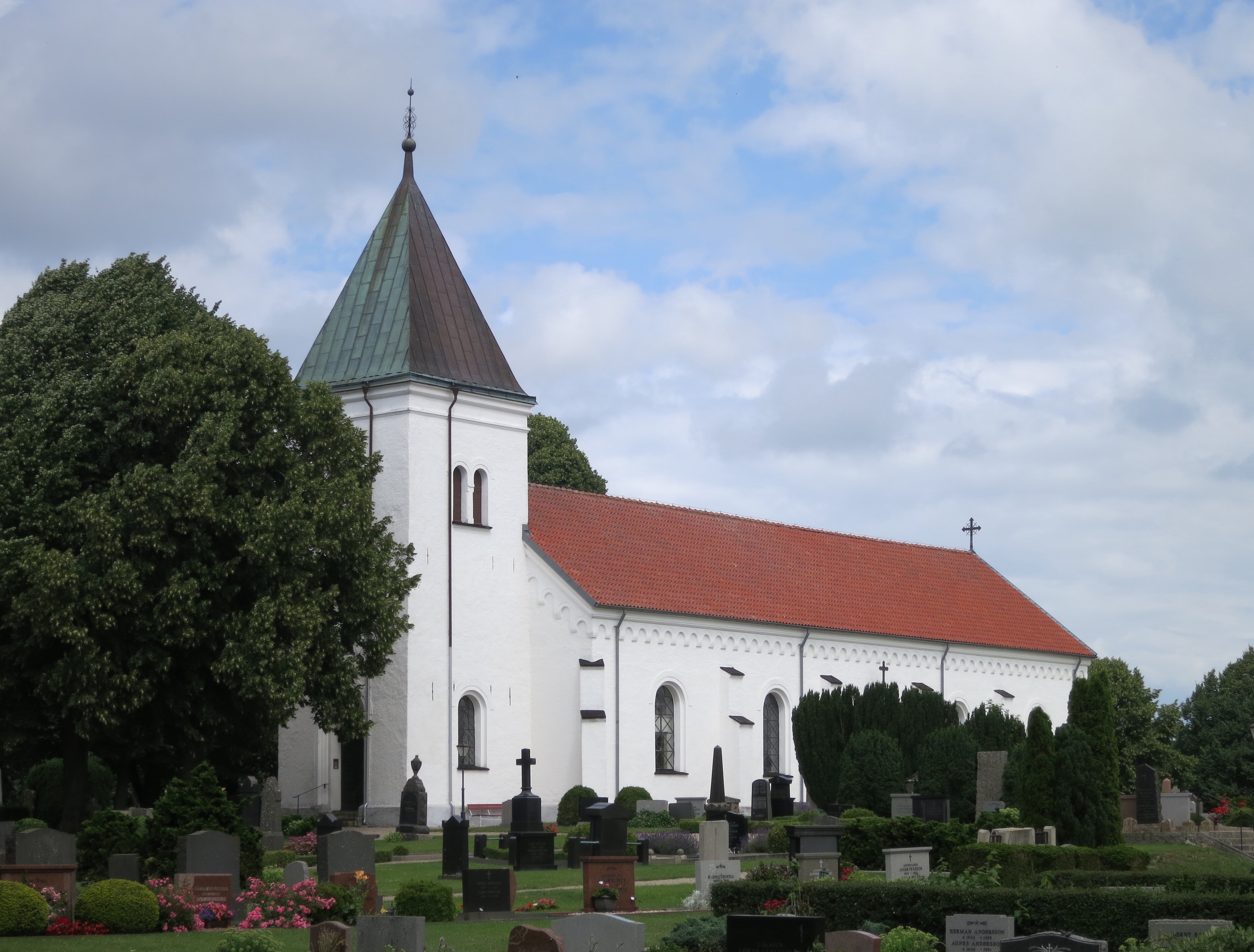
- Smedstorp church

- Location within Skåne Location within Sweden
- Coordinates: 55°33′N 14°07′E
- Country: Sweden
- Province: Skåne
- County: Skåne County
- Municipality: Tomelilla Municipality

Area
  - Total: 0.59 km^{2} (0.23 sq mi)

Population (31 December 2010)
  - Total: 363
  - Density: 611/km^{2} (1,580/sq mi)
- Time zone: UTC+1 (CET)
  - Summer (DST): UTC+2 (CEST)

Smedstorp is a locality situated in Tomelilla Municipality, Skåne County, Sweden. Located 15 km west of the town of Simrishamn, Smedstorp is a small village with 363 inhabitants in 2010.

On 1 January 2002 the current parish of Smedstorp was formed from the amalgamation of six small parishes Kverrestad, Smedstorp, Östra Ingelstad, Bollerup, Tosterup and Övraby. So, the parish of Smedstorp extends beyond the village itself to the surrounding farms and hamlets. Smedstorp is also a postal district covering and even larger area.

== History ==
In the 18th Century, only a handful of houses existed in the village of Smedstorp. They were inhabited mostly by craftsmen and farm workers, who owned no land of their own. At this time, the main road passed through the Smedstorp Manor estate.

During the early 19th Century, more small houses were built. With the passing of the Farming Act in 1842, the fairly poor soil south of the main road started to be farmed. By 1930, all land south of the main road had become farm land.

In 1882, a privately owned railway service was in place and started a Simrishamn - Tomelilla service. The station of Smedstorp was built on a piece of land that had previously been grazing land for cattle. The only house in the vicinity was a small cottage where a soldier lived. The railway and station attracted more people to the village, which resulted in more houses being built. This meant that the village grew fast.

In 1896, the railway company merged with the Tomelilla - Malmö Railway, resulting in direct access to Malmö from Smedstorp. The same year saw the constitution of the municipality of Smedstorp, and Smedstorp itself was given the status of town, even though it was not technically a town. Smedstorp became the centre of the region.

At the turn of the century there were approximately ten stores in the town and around forty other businesses and craftsmen, including a distillery, a brewery and a dairy. The small original station building was torn down and replaced by an elegant new station in 1912. This station house is still standing today.

Smedstorp remained an independent municipality until the passing of the Municipalities Act in 1972.

=== Historical Sites ===
==== The Site at Gårdlösåsen ====
Smedstorp' history is traceable to the third century A.D. A number of archaeological excavations have contributed to significant discoveries about the locality's early history. In 1949, investigations of nearby Gårdlösåsen uncovered a young girl's grave, containing jewellery along with her remains. The most famous is a silver item from the third century. Its inscription uses letters from the oldest written language found in this part of the world. From this find, the young girl gained her nickname, "The Silver Girl." Near her grave, the remains of 56 houses were also found, dating from between the fifth and tenth centuries.

==== The Manor ====
One of the oldest large estates in the province of Skåne is Smedstorp Manor. The manor and its grounds are rich in history. In the fourteenth century, the estate belonged to the Danish family of Bing. In the latter part of the sixteenth century, Anders Keldsen Bing built the manor house that stands today.

After Bing's death in 1589, the estate had a number of different owners. Eventually, it was bought by one of the greatest noblemen in Denmark, Joakim Gjersdorff. After the peace treaty of Roskilde between Denmark and Sweden in 1658, Gjersdorff sold all his estates to the King of Denmark.

In 1660, Smedstorp estate was one of 18 large estates in the southern part of Sweden that were given to Sweden by Denmark in exchange for the island of Bornholm. The estate then became part of the personal property of the Swedish king. For a long time, it housed high-ranking Swedish Army officers.

After a fire in 1930, only the main building of the manor remained. This two-storey house built of grey stone is now in private ownership and is not open to the public.

==== The Church ====
A church is situated close to Smedstorp Manor and it is likely that it was once a church belonging to the manorial estate. During the 1860s, the old mediaeval church was demolished and in 1867 a new one was built. The altar, however, dates back to the 1590s.

There is an impressive sculpture in the church, which was made to commemorate Anders Bing, the founder of Smedstorp manor. Made of blackstone, sandstone, marble, and alabaster, the sculpture is considered to be one of the strangest pieces of art of the Nordic Renaissance.

Local myth says that there is a secret tunnel connecting the church to the manor house.

== Community Life ==
=== Location ===
Geographically, Smedstorp is situated right in the middle of the area called Österlen, the south-east corner of Sweden. This area is bounded by Brösarp to the north, Simrishamn to the east, Tomelilla to the west and Sandhammaren to the south.

=== Economy ===
Although it's a small village, many of its inhabitants find employment in Smedstorp.

=== Amenities ===
It has a school, which boasts a day-care centre and a pre-school group in addition to classes from grade 1 to grade 6. Buses bring pupils from nearby villages. The school also houses the public library and next door is the outdoor public swimming pool.

There is also a village shop which stocks a wide assortment of food and other products, as well as providing some postal services. Other amenities include three hairdressers, a bank, and an outdoor pool.

Företaget Smedstorpskök i Smedstorp tillverkar köksinredningar. The company Smedstorpskök in Smedstorp manufactures kitchen cabinets.

There is also a fire station with two fire engines. It is operated by a voluntary fire brigade. Each Monday at 4:10 pm the fire alarm sounds across the village and fields, as it is tested.

The village hall is run and administered by the Smedstorp Village Society. The hall itself is available for hire, and hosts a lot of activities, such as the traditional New Year's Eve party and the Thursday luncheon for the retired people from the village and round about.

=== Festivals ===
Every year on the first Friday in July, traveling merchants come to Smedstorp for the annual Smedstorp Fair. Local societies and associations arrange bric-a-brac stalls and jumble sales, and a traditional countryside auction. A small amusement park also sets up on the site.

=== Transportation ===
Smedstorp has a railway station, and commuting to Simrishamn and Ystad, and from Ystad on to Malmö and Copenhagen, is easy. There are up to 12 daily train departures in each direction. The Simrishamn-Ystad stretch of railway was upgraded to take electric trains in 2003 and substantial improvements were made to the track during 2005–06.

A public bus service is also available. One can get to places like Lund in about an hour.

=== Notable Citizens ===
==== Charles Lindbergh ====
In 1859, member of the Swedish parliament, Ola Månsson, fled from Smedstorp to the United States of America. He was facing a jail sentence due to financial troubles and marriage problems. He left Sweden with his 21-year-old mistress and their newly born son Karl-August, abandoning his wife and their seven children.

Månsson changed his name to Lindbergh and his son Karl-August assumed the more American-sounding name "Charles August". Charles August studied Law and was a member of Congress in the USA between 1907 and 1917.

His son, Charles A. Lindbergh, born 4 February 4, 1902, made the first ever non-stop crossing of the Atlantic Ocean in a single-seated aeroplane on May 20–21, 1927. This made him one of the greatest heroes in the history of aviation.
