= Tomelilla Municipality =

Tomelilla Municipality Tomelilla kommun
- Municipality
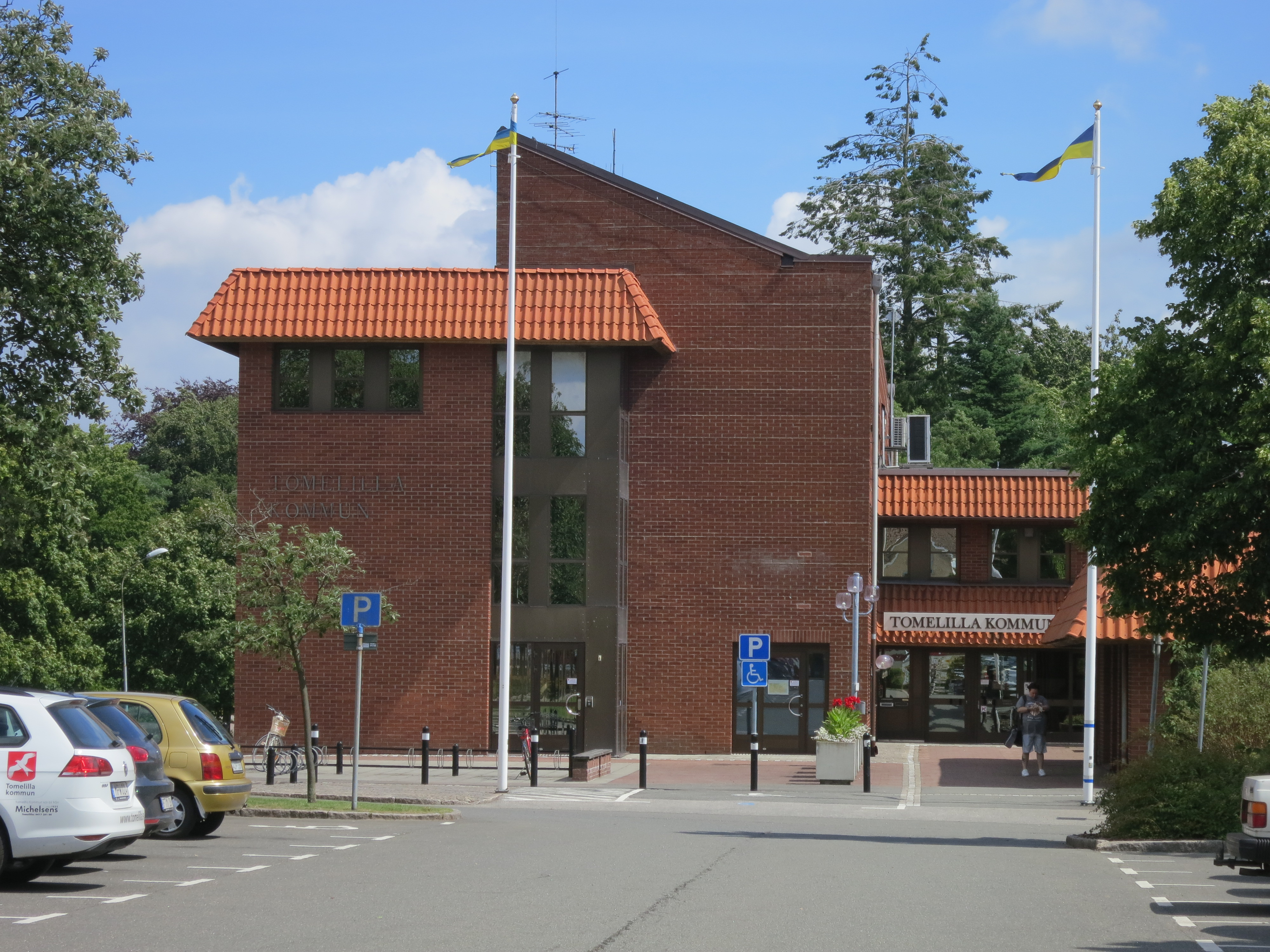
- Tomelilla City Hall

- Flag Coat of arms

- Coordinates: 55°33′N 13°57′E
- Country: Sweden
- County: Skåne County
- Seat: Tomelilla

Area
  - Total: 397.39 km^{2} (153.43 sq mi)
  - Land: 395.94 km^{2} (152.87 sq mi)
  - Water: 1.45 km^{2} (0.56 sq mi)
- Area as of 1 January 2014.

Population (30 June 2025)
  - Total: 13,686
  - Density: 34.566/km^{2} (89.525/sq mi)
- Time zone: UTC+1 (CET)
  - Summer (DST): UTC+2 (CEST)
- ISO 3166 code: SE
- Province: Scania
- Municipal code: 1270
- Website: www.tomelilla.se

Tomelilla Municipality (Swedish: Tomelilla kommun) is a municipality in Skåne County in southern Sweden. Its seat is located in the town Tomelilla.

The municipality was formed through a series of amalgamations taking place in 1952, 1969 and 1971. The number of pre-1952 units making up the present municipality is twenty.

== Geography ==
Tomelilla Municipality is located in the south-eastern plains of Scania known as Österlen, which is an area notable for its beauty, and thus popular among painters as well as covered with summer cottages, country mansions, and so on.

=== Localities ===
There were seven localities in the municipality in 2018.

Locality	Population
Tomelilla	7,139
Brösarp	734
Onslunda	499
Smedstorp	377
Lunnarp	345
Skåne-Tranås	226
Spjutstorp	200

== Demographics ==
This is a demographic table based on Tomelilla Municipality's electoral districts in the 2022 Swedish general election sourced from SVT's election platform, in turn taken from SCB official statistics.

In total there were 13,696 inhabitants, including 10,419 Swedish citizens of voting age. 36.5% voted for the left coalition and 62.2% for the right coalition. Indicators are in percentage points except population totals and income.

Location	Residents	Citizen adults	Left vote	Right vote	Employed	Swedish parents	Foreign heritage	Income SEK	Degree
Location			%	%					
Brösarp	1,887	1,624	44.6	53.5	82	90	10	21,929	41
Onslunda	2,169	1,634	32.0	66.9	81	88	12	23,298	27
Smedstorp	1,684	1,311	33.9	64.8	81	88	12	25,433	27
Tomelilla S	2,206	1,609	35.8	63.2	80	83	17	23,041	27
Tomelilla SV	1,877	1,364	40.7	57.8	72	76	24	20,379	21
Tomelilla V-Tryde	1,985	1,502	33.8	65.7	82	84	16	24,522	26
Tomelilla Ö	1,888	1,375	35.3	63.4	72	75	25	20,707	21
Source: SVT

== Notability ==
Tomelilla Municipality was made famous by comedy duo Tage Danielsson (1928–1985) and Hans Alfredson (1931–2017), who directed and acted in numerous movies that were filmed in and around the town of Tomelilla:

- The Apple War (1972)
- Ägget är löst (1975)
- Picassos äventyr (1978)
- Den enfaldige mördaren (1982)
- P&B (1983)
- Jim & piraterna Blom (1986)

The following notable people live in Tomelilla:

- Hans Alfredson (director/actor)
- Gösta Ekman (actor)
- Ulf Lundell (singer)
- Gudrun Schyman (politician)

Tomelilla Municipality is known for the amusement park Tosselilla Summer Park, possibly the most visited amusement park in the province, and the Hallamölla waterfall. Kåseholm Manor is located in Tomelilla Municipality.

Its coat of arms is from 2002. It depicts the bird kite, native to the area, in silver on a red shield.
