= August Lindbergh =

Swedish American farmer & politician (1808-1893)

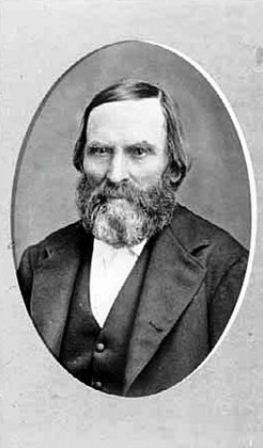
- Lindbergh c. 1873
- Born: Ola Månsson; May 12, 1808; Smedstorp, Tomelilla Municipality, Sweden
- Died: October 14, 1893 (aged 85); Little Falls, Minnesota, U.S.
- Occupations: farmer, politician
- Spouses: Ingar Jönsdotter (died 1864) Lovisa Jansdotter Carlén (m. 1885)
- Children: 14, including Charles August Lindbergh

August Lindbergh (12 May 1808 – 14 October 1893) was a Swedish American farmer and politician. He was the father of the U.S. politician Charles August Lindbergh, and the grandfather of aviator Charles Lindbergh.

== Life ==
August Lindbergh was born Ola Månsson in Smedstorp, Tomelilla Municipality in Skåne, Sweden. His father, Måns Jönsson, married to Sara Carlsdotter, owned the small farm Gårdslösa and worked as a parish tailor in Smedstorp. Through his marriage to Ingar Jönsdotter, who brought in a substantial dowry, and his own hard work, Månsson became a well-to-do farmer and in 1847 was elected to the Swedish Riksdag of the Estates, representing the farmers' estate. In the Riksdag, he distinguished himself as a brilliant orator (although he most probably had attended only three classes of primary school) and a champion of liberalism, who fought for equal rights for the Jews, for allowing foreigners to hold professorships at Swedish universities, for land reform (proposing to dismember huge estates belonging to the Church of Sweden) and for extending the railway net. He also worked as a bank director. When accused of bribery and embezzlement, Månsson changed his name to August Lindbergh. He left his wife Ingar Jönsdotter and their seven children, and fled to the United States with his mistress (a Stockholm waitress, Lovisa Jansdotter Carlén) and their illegitimate infant son Carl in 1859. Lovisa became Louisa and Carl became Charles August. They settled in Melrose, Minnesota, where August worked as a farmer and a blacksmith. August became a widower in 1864 at the death of his first wife who had remained in Sweden. August and Louisa had six more children born in Minnesota; the couple married in 1885.

Two of August Lindbergh's sons by his first marriage, Måns and Per, also changed their surnames to Lindbergh while attending college in Sweden. Around 1862, these two and a third son (August Olsson) emigrated to the United States, answering a request for help from their father who had lost an arm in a sawmill accident in 1861. Per came to live on the family farm in Minnesota, but Måns joined an Illinois unit of the Union Army in the American Civil War following which he returned to Sweden. There, Måns organized a group of about 200 emigrants whom he brought to Sherburne County, Minnesota. Måns then returned to Sweden to stay and died in Lund in 1870.

August Lindbergh became a naturalized citizen of the United States in 1870, joining the Republican Party. He advocated the use of the English language by immigrants. After his naturalization he held several posts in Melrose: he was a postmaster between 1879 and 1887, a village recorder and town clerk between 1888 and 1889. He also acted as a Justice of the Peace.

== Death ==
August Lindbergh died in Little Falls, Minnesota. His wife Louisa, thirty years his junior, died on April 22, 1921. They were buried at Oak Hill Cemetery in Melrose together with three of their younger children, who did not live long.
