= Evangeline Lodge Land Lindbergh =

Mother of Charles Lindbergh (1876–1954)

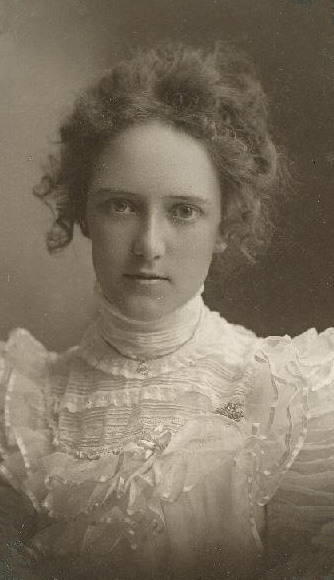
- Lindbergh c. 1899
- Born: Evangeline Lodge Land; May 29, 1876; Detroit, Michigan, US
- Died: September 7, 1954 (aged 78); Grosse Pointe Park, Michigan, US
- Resting place: Pine Lake Cemetery, West Bloomfield, Michigan, US
- Education: University of Michigan (BS); Columbia University (MA)
- Occupation: Chemistry teacher
- Employer(s): Little Falls High School; Cass Technical School
- Known for: Mother of famous aviator
- Spouse: Charles August Lindbergh (m. 1901; died 1924)
- Children: Charles Lindbergh

Evangeline Lodge Land Lindbergh (May 29, 1876 – September 7, 1954) was an American teacher best known as the mother of famed aviator Charles Lindbergh. She was raised in a highly educated family; her dentist father Charles H. Land pioneered porcelain and gold tooth crowns, and her uncle John Christian Lodge (1862–1950) was the 51st, 54th, and 56th mayor of Detroit. Speaking with reporters after her son's success flying the first solo crossing of the Atlantic Ocean, Evangeline said; "I am grateful. There is no use attempting to find words to express my happiness."

== Personal life ==
She was born Evangeline Lodge Land in Detroit on May 29, 1876, to newlyweds, married in 1875: Dr. Charles Henry Land (1847–1922) and Evangeline Lodge (1850–1919).

In 1899, Evangeline graduated from the University of Michigan and taught chemistry at Little Falls High School. On March 27, 1901, she married Charles August Lindbergh. Evangeline gave birth to son Charles Augustus Lindbergh on February 4, 1902. Later that year, the family settled into a new house of the river in Little Falls, Minnesota. Charles senior had established a successful law practice in Little Falls after graduating from the University of Michigan Law School in 1883. His first wife Mary LaFond had died after abdominal surgery in 1898. Charles, a Republican, served as a U.S. Congressman (R-Minn.-6) from 1907 to 1917.

Evangeline often had difficulty raising her two step-daughters, Lillian and Eva, who both eventually moved away. She often threatened her husband with divorce; he then caved in to her demands, fearing a divorce would cost him his seat in Congress. After further problems, Evangeline began to live in a separate residence in 1909. Her son graduated from Little Falls High School on June 5, 1918; in the same year, his parents separated. In 1920, Evangeline and her son rented rooms at a boarding house in Madison while Charles Jr. attended the University of Wisconsin–Madison. Lindbergh dropped out in the middle of his sophomore year to fly in Lincoln, Nebraska. Evangeline spent one summer traveling with her son as he barnstormed through the mid-west United States. Resuming her career, Evangeline graduated from Columbia University in 1925 with a master's degree in education. Except for teaching in Istanbul, Turkey, from 1928 to 1929, she taught chemistry at the Cass Technical High School in Detroit from 1922 until her retirement in 1942.

Evangeline visited her son prior to Lindbergh's historic solo transatlantic flight but, to minimize distractions, she left before his takeoff on May 20, 1927 from Roosevelt Field, Long Island.

In 1938 she accompanied her daughter-in-law and son who, at the request of the United States military, traveled to Germany to evaluate German aviation. At a dinner hosted by ambassador to Germany Hugh Wilson, Charles Lindbergh was presented the Order of the German Eagle by Germany's air chief, Hermann Göring, in attendance was Anne Lindbergh, Evangeline Lindbergh, and German aviation figures: Ernst Heinkel, Adolf Baeumker, and Willy Messerschmitt.

Evangeline Lodge Land Lindbergh died of Parkinson's disease on September 7, 1954, in Grosse Pointe Park, Michigan. Her grave site is located in the Pine Lake Cemetery, West Bloomfield, Michigan.

The Lindbergh's first family property is now the Charles Lindbergh House and Museum on the Charles A. Lindbergh State Park in Little Falls, Minnesota.

== Gallery ==
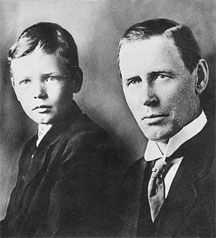
Husband Charles August Lindbergh with son Charles c. 1910

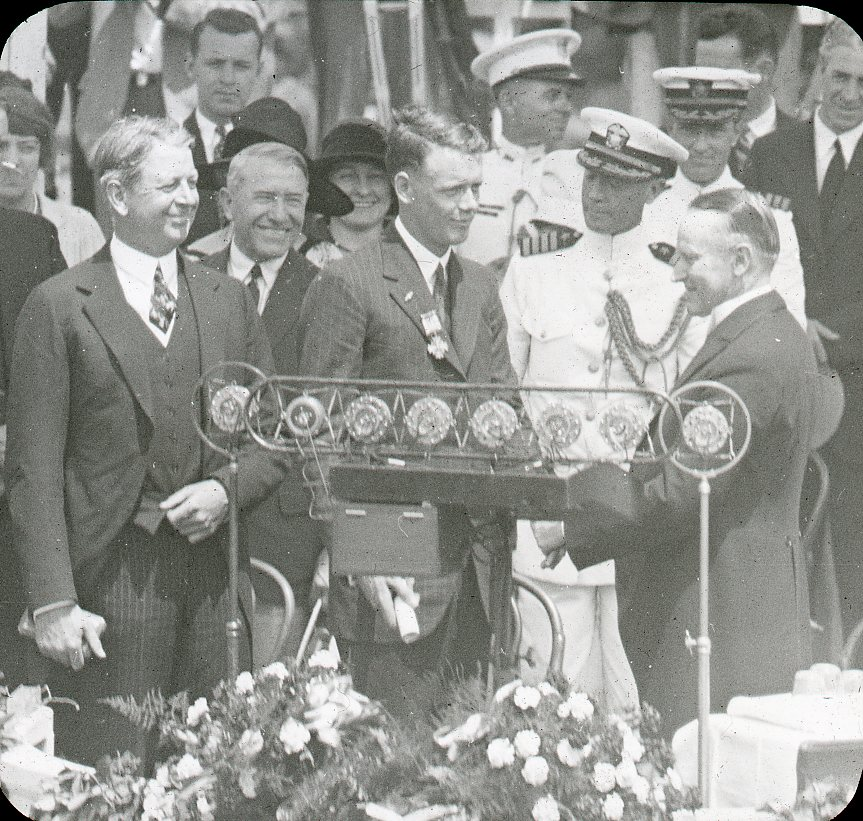
Lindbergh looks on as President Calvin Coolidge presents her son with the Distinguished Flying Cross (June 11, 1927)

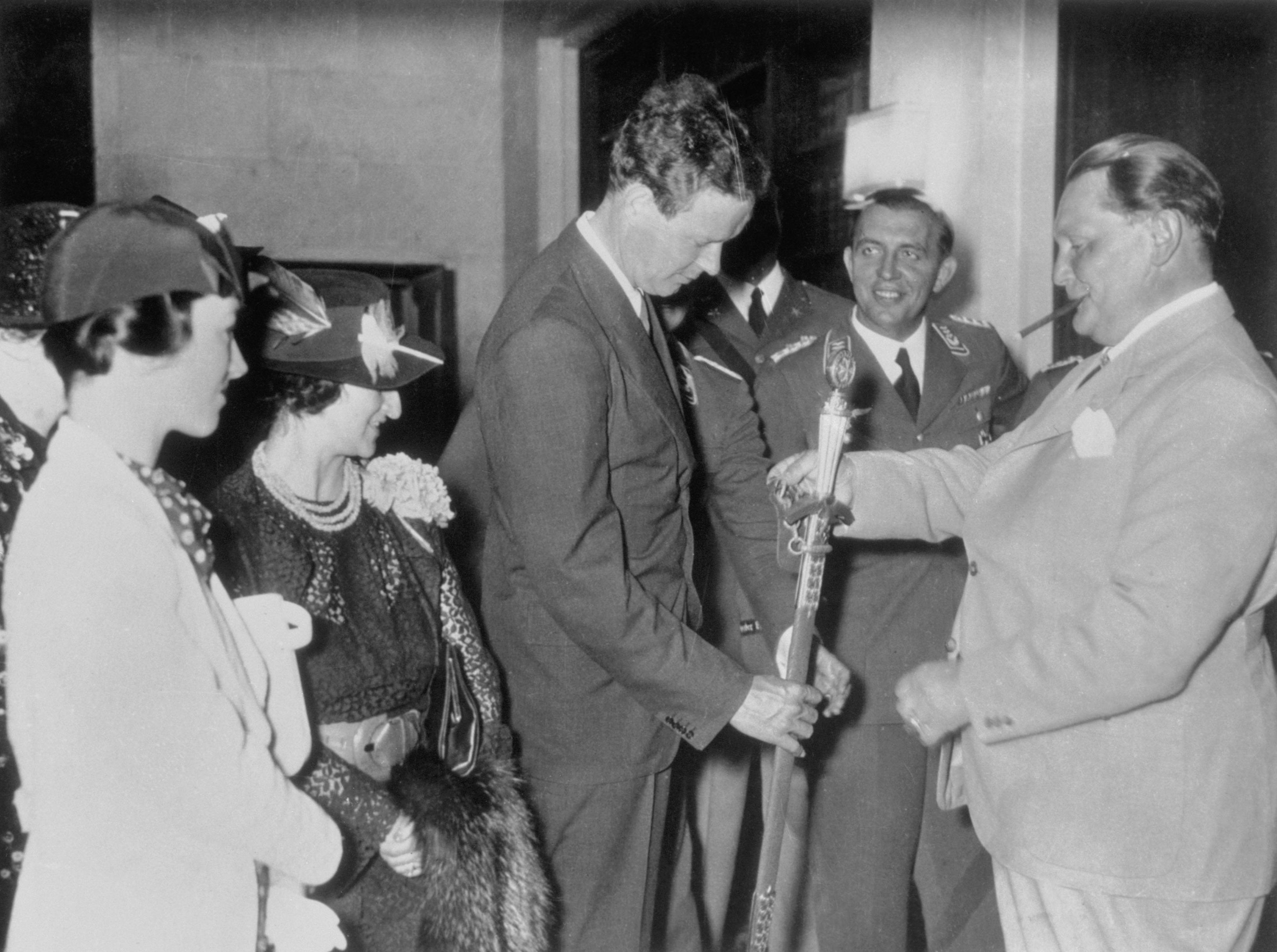
Göring presenting Charles Lindbergh, standing next to his mother and wife, with a medal on behalf of Adolf Hitler in October 1938

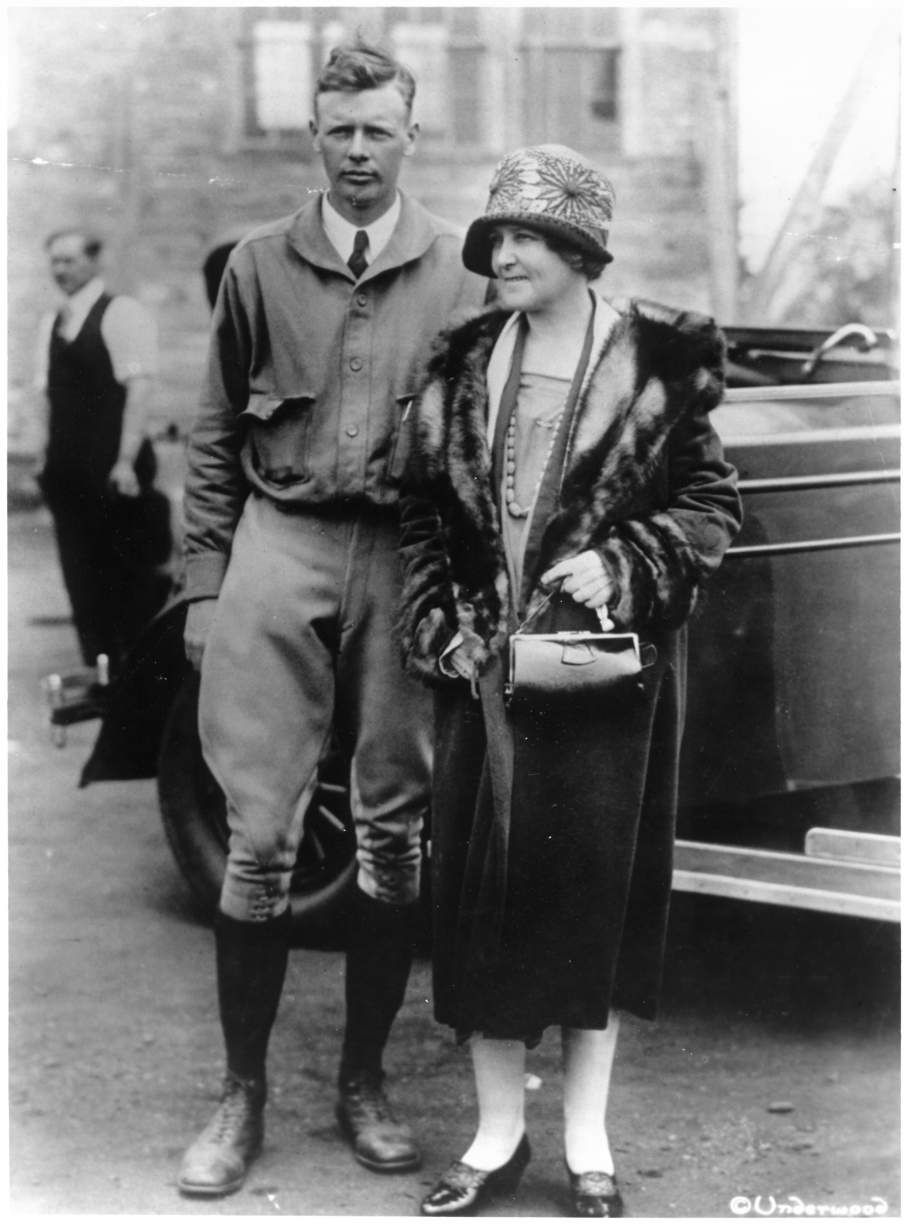
Lindbergh with son Charles

== See also ==
- Charles A. Lindbergh the aviator
- C.A. Lindbergh the congressman
- List of people diagnosed with Parkinson's disease
