= Onslunda =

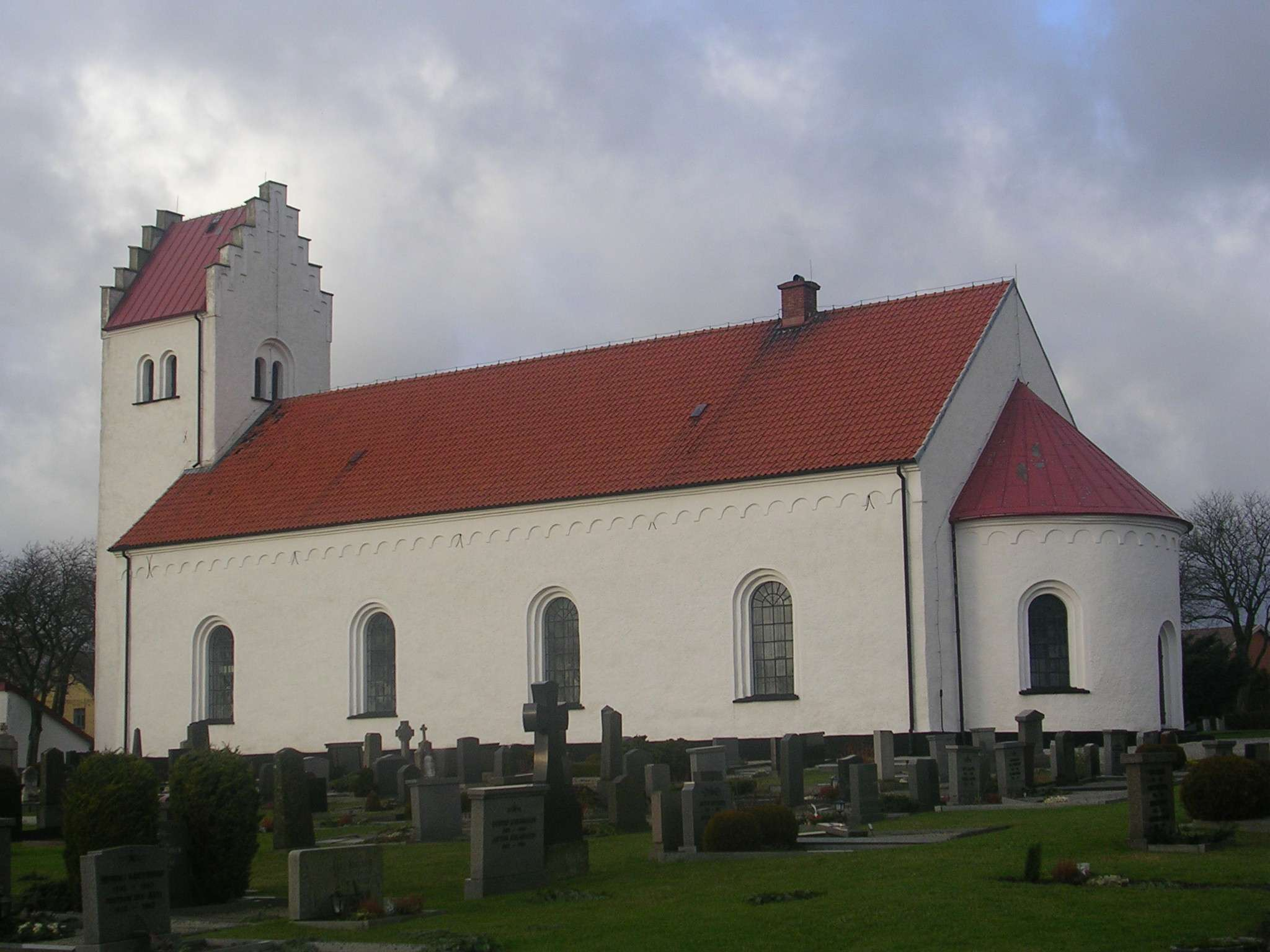
- Onslunda Church

- Location within Skåne Location within Sweden
- Coordinates: 55°36′N 14°03′E
- Country: Sweden
- Province: Skåne
- County: Skåne County
- Municipality: Tomelilla Municipality

Area
  - Land: 19.7 km^{2} (7.6 sq mi)
- Highest elevation: 107 m (351 ft)

Population (31 December 2010)
  - Total: 490
  - Density: 983/km^{2} (2,550/sq mi)
- Time zone: UTC+1 (CET)
  - Summer (DST): UTC+2 (CEST)
- GeoName: GeoName

Onslunda is a locality situated in Tomelilla Municipality, Skåne County, Sweden with 490 inhabitants in 2010. It lies around 10 km north-east of Tomelilla.

== Population ==
Population of Onslunda 1950 - 2015
Year	Population
1950	541
1955	522
1960	483
1965	453
1970	435
1975	388
1980	379
1985	377
1990	375
1995	398
2000	418
2015	453

== See also ==
- "Land- och vattenarealer per församling 2000-01-01". Statistics Sweden.
