= William Alexander Cant =

American judge

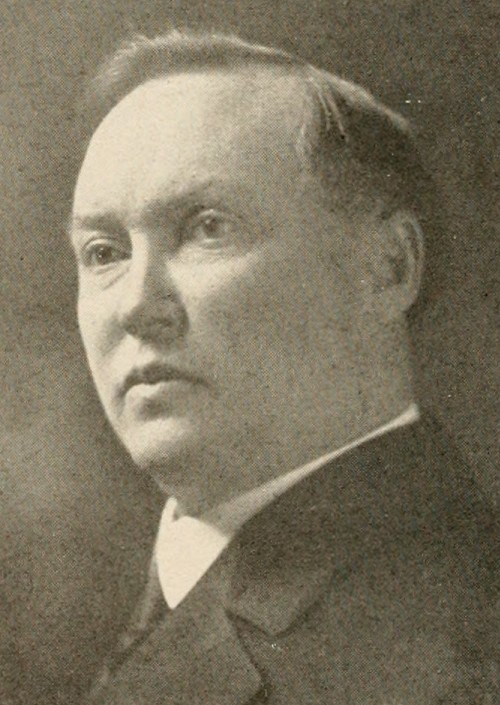

Judge of the United States District Court for the District of Minnesota
- In office May 21, 1923 – January 12, 1933
- Appointed by: Warren G. Harding (recess); Calvin Coolidge (commission)
- Preceded by: Page Morris
- Succeeded by: Robert C. Bell

Personal details
- Born: William Alexander Cant; December 26, 1863 Westfield, Wisconsin, U.S.
- Died: January 12, 1933 (aged 69)
- Education: University of Michigan Law School (LL.B.)

William Alexander Cant (December 23, 1863 – January 12, 1933) was a United States district judge of the United States District Court for the District of Minnesota.

== Education and career ==
Cant was born in Westfield, Marquette County, Wisconsin, Cant received a Bachelor of Laws from the University of Michigan Law School in 1885. He was in private practice in Duluth, Minnesota from 1886 to 1895. He was a member of the Minnesota House of Representatives in 1895, and was city attorney of Duluth from 1895 to 1896. He was a Judge of the District Court of Minnesota from 1896 to 1923.

== Federal judicial service ==
Cant received a recess appointment from President Warren G. Harding on May 21, 1923, to a seat on the United States District Court for the District of Minnesota vacated by Judge Page Morris. He was nominated to the same position by President Calvin Coolidge on December 15, 1923. He was confirmed by the United States Senate on January 15, 1924, and received his commission the same day. His service terminated on January 12, 1933, due to his death.

== Sources ==
Legal offices
Preceded by Page Morris	Judge of the United States District Court for the District of Minnesota; 1923–1933	Succeeded by Robert C. Bell
