= Charles H. Land =

American dentist (1847–1922)

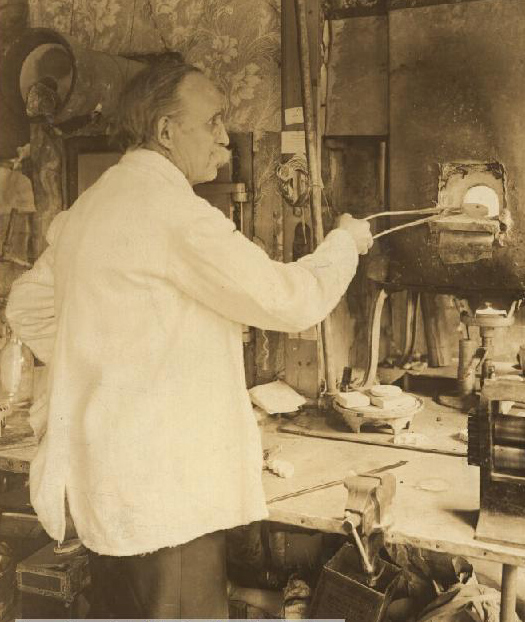
- Charles Henry Land in his laboratory circa 1900
- Born: Charles Henry Land; January 11, 1847; Canada West
- Died: April 8, 1922 (aged 75); Detroit, Michigan, USA
- Resting place: Woodlawn Cemetery; Detroit, Michigan
- Occupation: dentist
- Known for: Inventor of the jacket crown
- Spouse: Evangeline Lodge (1850–1919)

Charles Henry Land (January 11, 1847 – April 8, 1922) was a dentist who pioneered porcelain and gold teeth crowns. His brother, John Christian Lodge (1862–1950), was the 51st, 54th, and 56th mayor of Detroit. Land was the grandfather of aviator Charles Lindbergh (1902–1974).

== Personal life ==
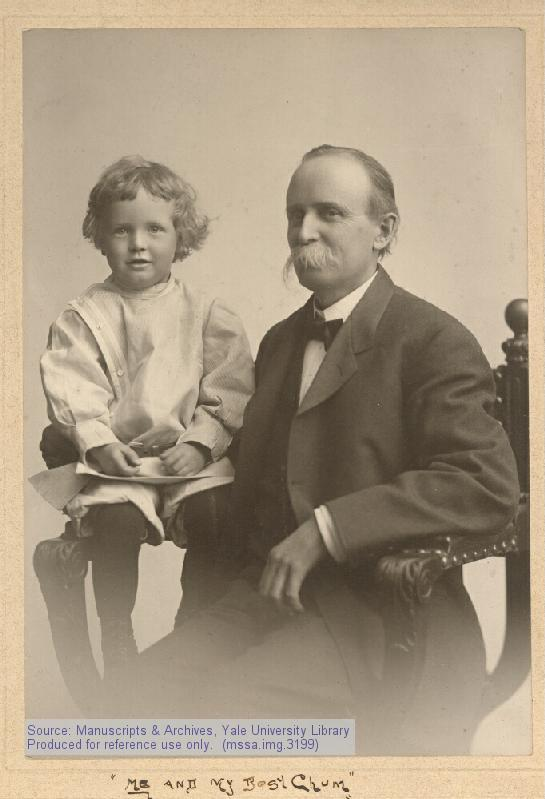
Land with grandson Charles Lindbergh "Me and my best chum" circa 1905

Land was born in Canada West on January 11, 1847. He was the son of Dr. Edwin A. Lodge and Christiana Lodge (née Hanson). He attended the Michigan Military Academy in 1881. On April 28, 1875, he married Evangeline Lodge (1850–1919). They had two children: Evangeline Lodge Land Lindbergh (1876–1954) and Charles H. Land II (1881–1961). Land is known as the father of porcelain and gold crowns. In 1889, he patented the platinum foil matrix for porcelain jacket crowns. His New-York Tribune obituary credits him as the inventor of the gold and porcelain inlay system. Land practiced dentistry for 58 years.
