= Robert C. Bell =

American judge

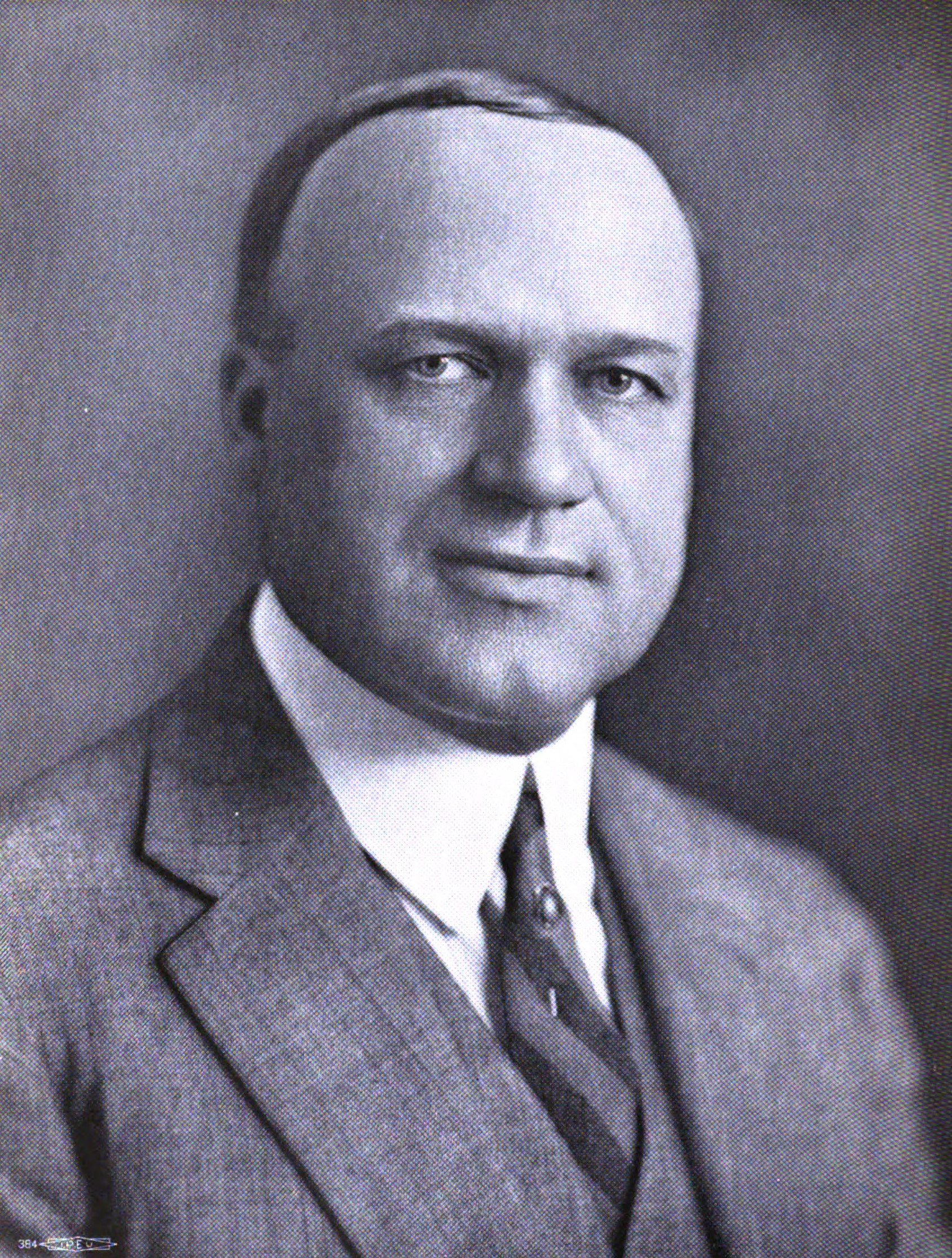

Senior Judge of the United States District Court for the District of Minnesota
- In office May 1, 1961 – March 17, 1964

Judge of the United States District Court for the District of Minnesota
- In office June 13, 1933 – May 1, 1961
- Appointed by: Franklin D. Roosevelt
- Preceded by: William Alexander Cant
- Succeeded by: Earl R. Larson

Personal details
- Born: Robert Cook Bell; November 1, 1880 Harrisonville, Missouri, U.S.
- Died: March 17, 1964 (aged 83)
- Education: University of Missouri School of Law (LL.B.)

Robert Cook Bell (November 1, 1880 – March 17, 1964) was a United States district judge of the United States District Court for the District of Minnesota.

== Education and career ==
Born in Harrisonville, Missouri, Bell received a Bachelor of Laws from the University of Missouri School of Law in 1908. He was in private practice in St. Joseph, Missouri from 1908 to 1916. He was a special assistant to the Attorney General of the United States in the United States Department of Justice in Minnesota from 1916 to 1918, then in Denver, Colorado until 1920, and then in Missouri again in 1921. He returned to private practice in Detroit Lakes, Minnesota from 1921 to 1933, serving as counsel to the Red Lake Indians of Minnesota from 1927 to 1933, and to the Pillager Indians of Minnesota from 1930 to 1933. He was also a member of the Minnesota Senate from 1928 to 1933 and was a Democrat.

== Federal judicial service ==
On June 8, 1933, Bell was nominated by President Franklin D. Roosevelt to a seat on the United States District Court for the District of Minnesota vacated by Judge William Alexander Cant. Bell was confirmed by the United States Senate on June 10, 1933, and received his commission on June 13, 1933. He assumed senior status on May 1, 1961, serving in that capacity until his death on March 17, 1964.

== Sources ==
Party political offices
Preceded by James E. Doran	Democratic nominee for Attorney General of Minnesota; 1924	Succeeded by George Cahill
Legal offices
Preceded by William Alexander Cant	Judge of the United States District Court for the District of Minnesota; 1933–1961	Succeeded by Earl R. Larson
