= Lunnarp =

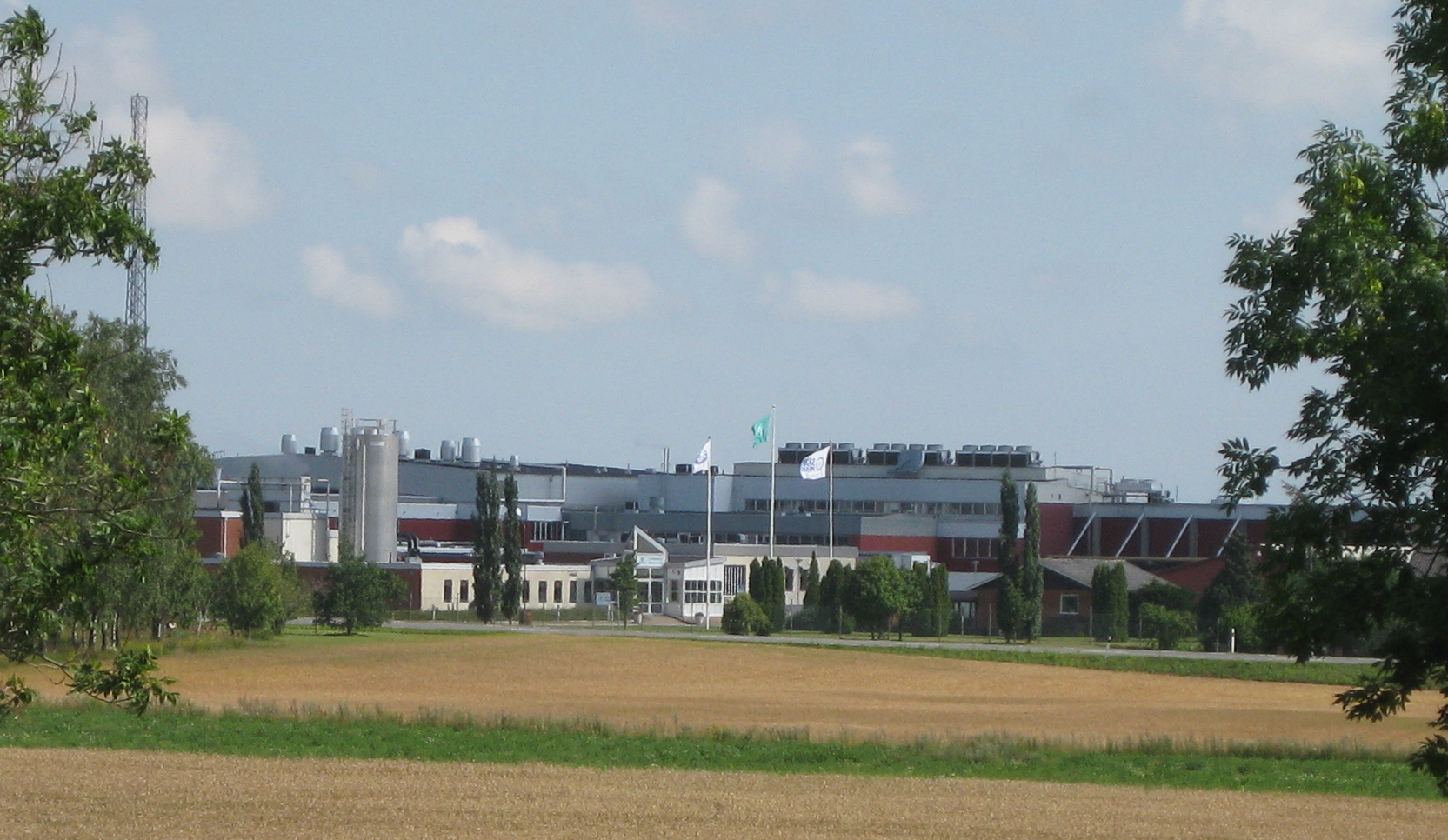

- Location within Skåne Location within Sweden
- Coordinates: 55°33′N 14°03′E
- Country: Sweden
- Province: Skåne
- County: Skåne County
- Municipality: Tomelilla Municipality

Area
  - Total: 0.46 km^{2} (0.18 sq mi)

Population (31 December 2010)
  - Total: 339
  - Density: 734/km^{2} (1,900/sq mi)
- Time zone: UTC+1 (CET)
  - Summer (DST): UTC+2 (CEST)

Lunnarp is a locality situated in Tomelilla Municipality, Skåne County, Sweden with 339 inhabitants in 2010.
