= Tosselilla Summer Park =

Amusement park in Skåne County, Sweden

- Previously known as Tomelilla Summer Park
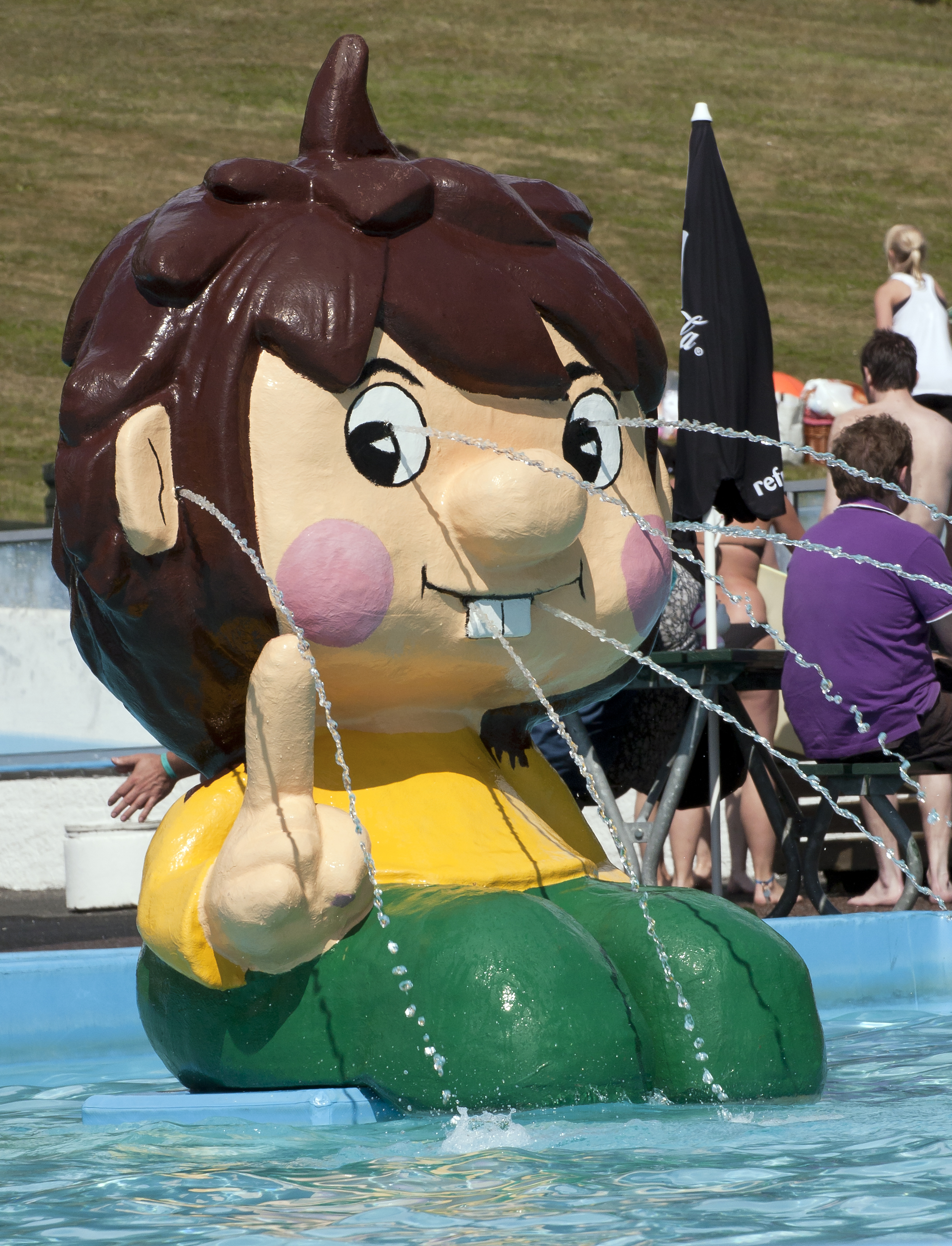
- Tosselilla Summer Park
- Interactive map of Tosselilla Summer Park
- Location: Tomelilla, Skåne, Sweden
- Coordinates: 55°33′11″N 13°54′22″E
- Opened: 26 May 1984
- Website: tosselilla.se

Tosselilla Summer Park (Swedish: Tosselilla sommarland) or Tosselilla Amusement Park, previously Tomelilla Summer Park (Swedish: Tomelilla sommarland), is an amusement park outside Tomelilla, Sweden. It was opened on 26 May 1984. There are 86 Activities at Tosselilla, including a zipline, swimming pools, roller coasters, water coasters, canoes and bumper cars.

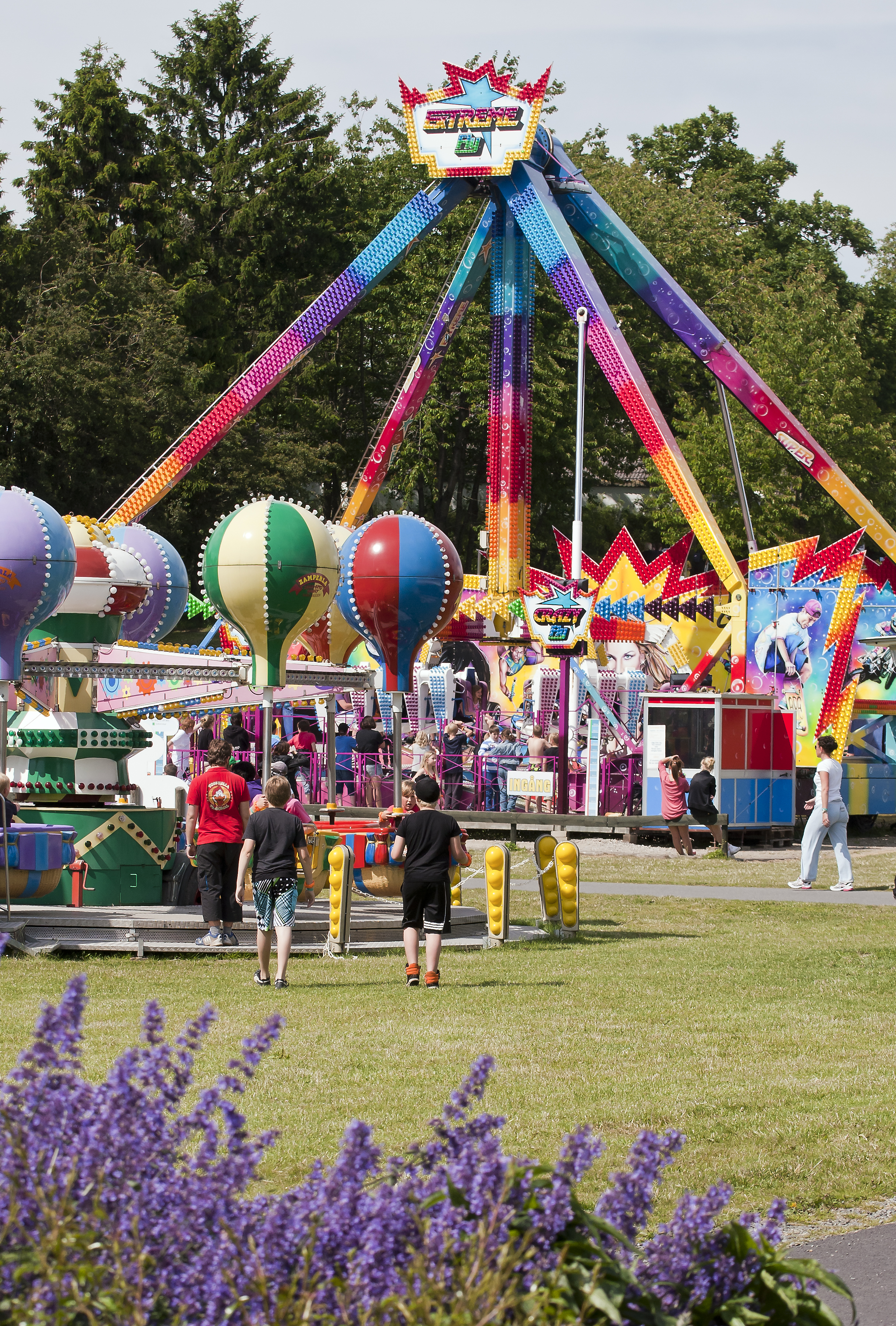
Extreme Fly, One of the rides at Tosselilla
