= Kåseholm Manor =

Castle in Tomelilla Municipality, Scania, Sweden

Kåseholm Castle
- Kåseholms slott
- Tomelilla Municipality
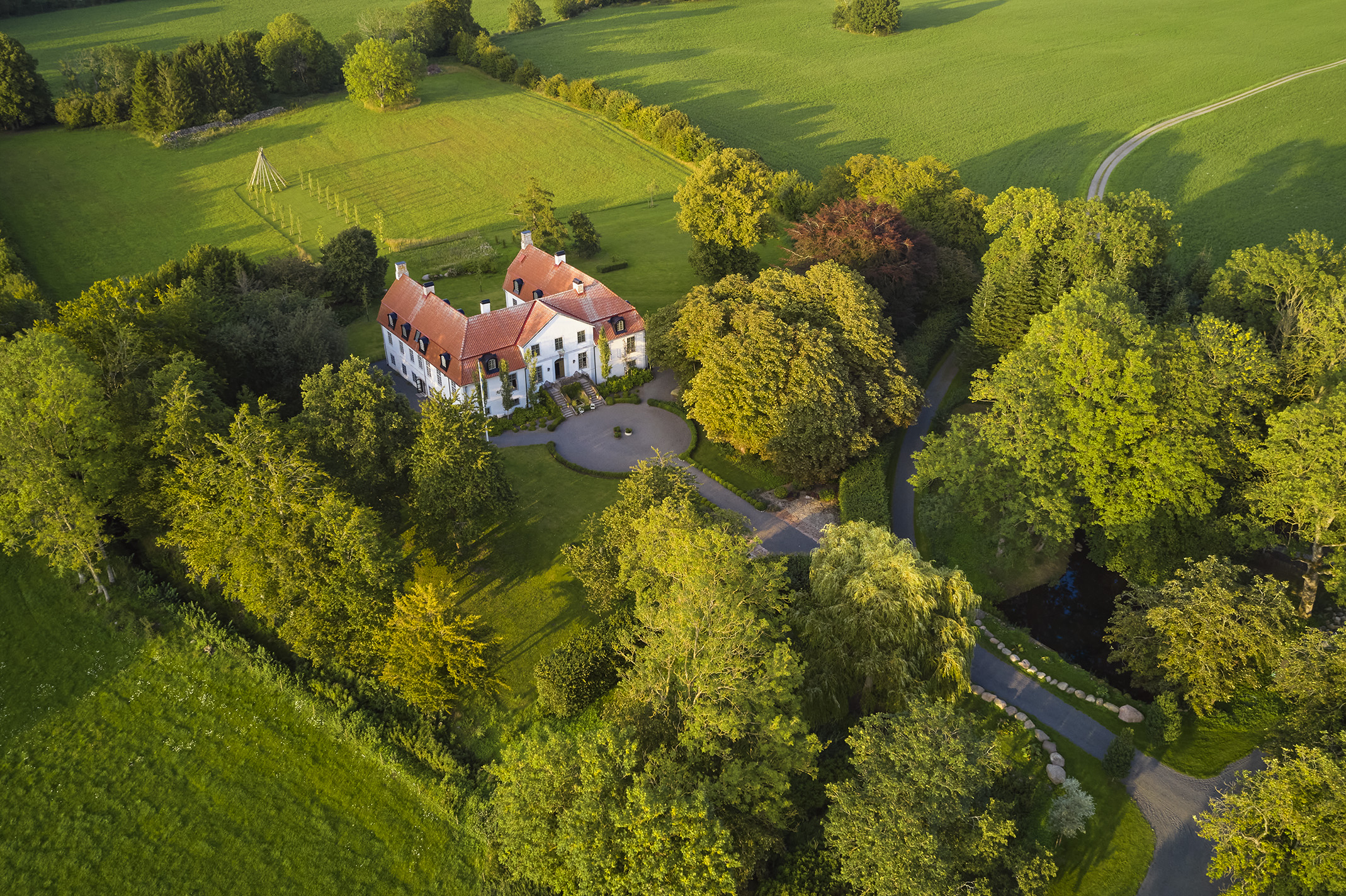

Site information
- Type: Castle
- Open to the public: Yes

Location
- Scania, Sweden
- Location within Skåne
- Coordinates: 55.3525°N 13.5304°E

Site history
- Built: 1632

Garrison information
- Occupants: Joakim Silvandersson, Jamie White

Kåseholm Castle (Swedish: Kåseholm slott) is a castle in Tomelilla Municipality in Skåne.

== History ==
In 1674, the manor was acquired by Enevold Fredrik Akeleye, cousin to Johan Urne, nobleman, admiral and judge for Halland County. He had inherited the Hjularöd estate, in Harlös Sweden and sold it in 1662 for a great deal of money which enabled him to buy and renovate Kåseholm as well as buy several neighbouring farms. The manor was then called Esbjörnsstorp. Johan Uhrne changed its name to Kåseholm after his wife Pernille Kaas. The oldest parts of the castle are probably part of the stone house that Johan Uhrne built around 1650.
