= Clarence Buckman =

American politician

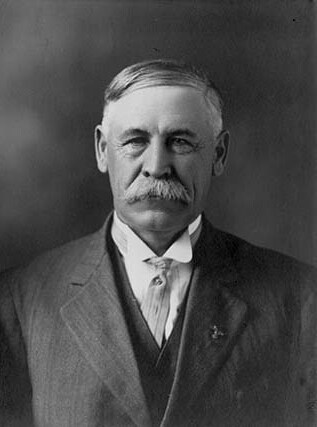

Member of the U.S. House of Representatives from Minnesota's 6th district
- In office March 4, 1903 – March 3, 1907
- Preceded by: Robert P. Morris
- Succeeded by: Charles August Lindbergh

Member of the Minnesota Senate from the 48th district
- In office January 3, 1899 – January 5, 1903
- Preceded by: Alonzo B. Cole
- Succeeded by: John Taylor Frater

Member of the Minnesota Senate from the 39th district
- In office January 2, 1883 – January 5, 1891
- Preceded by: Lars K. Aaker
- Succeeded by: Silas W. Leavitt

Member of the Minnesota House of Representatives from the 30th district
- In office January 4, 1881 – January 1, 1883
- Preceded by: Abram M. Fridley
- Succeeded by: Frederick H. Boardman; William H. Grimshaw; Orange S. Miller; August Von Ende

Personal details
- Born: Clarence Bennett Buckman; April 1, 1851 (uncertain) Doylestown, Pennsylvania, U.S.
- Died: March 1, 1917 (aged 65) Battle Creek, Michigan, U.S.
- Resting place: Oakland Cemetery, Little Falls, Minnesota
- Party: Republican

Clarence Bennett Buckman (April 1, 1851 – March 1, 1917) was an American farmer, lumberman, and politician who served in the United States House of Representatives for Minnesota's 6th congressional district from 1903 to 1907. He also served in both houses of the Minnesota Legislature prior to his election to Congress.

== Early life and pre-political career ==
Buckman was born in Doylestown, Pennsylvania, on April 1. The year is uncertain, with sources claiming it to be anywhere between 1849 and 1852; 1851 seems to be the most widely accepted year. He moved to Minnesota in 1872 and was involved in agriculture and the lumber industry before being appointed justice of the peace in 1873. When the area he lived on became incorporated in 1874, it was named after him, becoming Buckman, Minnesota. A September 13, 1876 threshing machine accident on his farm caused him to lose his left leg. He would use a wooden leg for the rest of his life and reportedly practiced enough that he walked without a limp. He moved to Little Falls in 1880.

== Political career and retirement ==
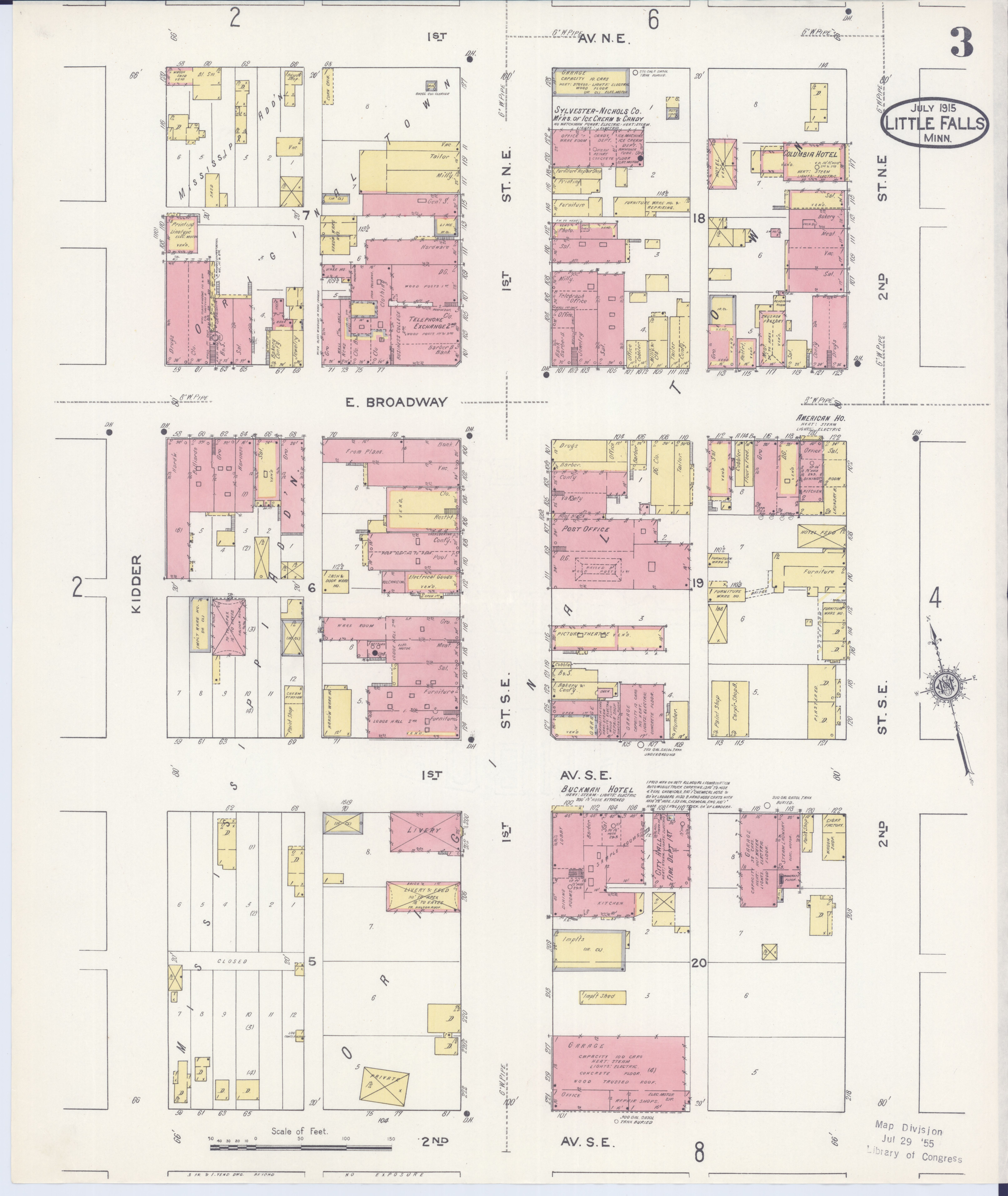
Sanborn Map of Little Falls dated July 1915. The Buckman Hotel is in the bottom right.

Buckman was elected to the Minnesota House of Representatives for the 30th district in 1880. He served only one term, as he won the Minnesota Senate seat for the 39th district in 1882. During his term, he served as chairman for the Grain and Warehouse Inspection Committee. His farm in Buckman was destroyed by the 1886 Sauk Rapids tornado. He was reelected to the state Senate in 1886, although during the term his residence was listed as Sauk Rapids. During the first half of his term, he was designated president pro tempore and also served as chairman for the Booms and Logs Special Committee and the Finance Committee. He was not reelected to his state Senate seat in 1890. In 1892, disliking the accommodations of his Little Falls hotel room, Buckman decided he would build his own. He bought a corner lot in the downtown area and designed the building himself, telling the architects to only fill in the blanks. The hotel opened its doors on February 16, 1893, and was considered Little Falls' high-end hotel. The building now serves as a senior living facility and is a contributing building to the Little Falls Commercial Historic District. Buckman returned to politics when he won election to the state Senate for the 48th district in 1898, this time running as an Independent Republican instead of Republican, which he ran as for the other positions he held. He served as chairman of the Internal Improvements Committee for his first term and chair for the Labor Committee in his second. He then won a seat in the U.S. House of Representatives for the 6th district in 1902 and won reelection in 1904 before losing renomination to Charles Lindbergh, Sr. in 1906. He was a U.S. deputy marshal from 1907 to 1912.

He died at the Battle Creek Sanitarium in Michigan on March 1, 1917, and is buried in Oakland Cemetery in Little Falls.

U.S. House of Representatives
Preceded by Robert P. Morris	U.S. Representative from Minnesota's 6th congressional district 1903 – 1907	Succeeded by Charles Lindbergh, Sr.
