= Page Morris =

American judge (1853–1924)

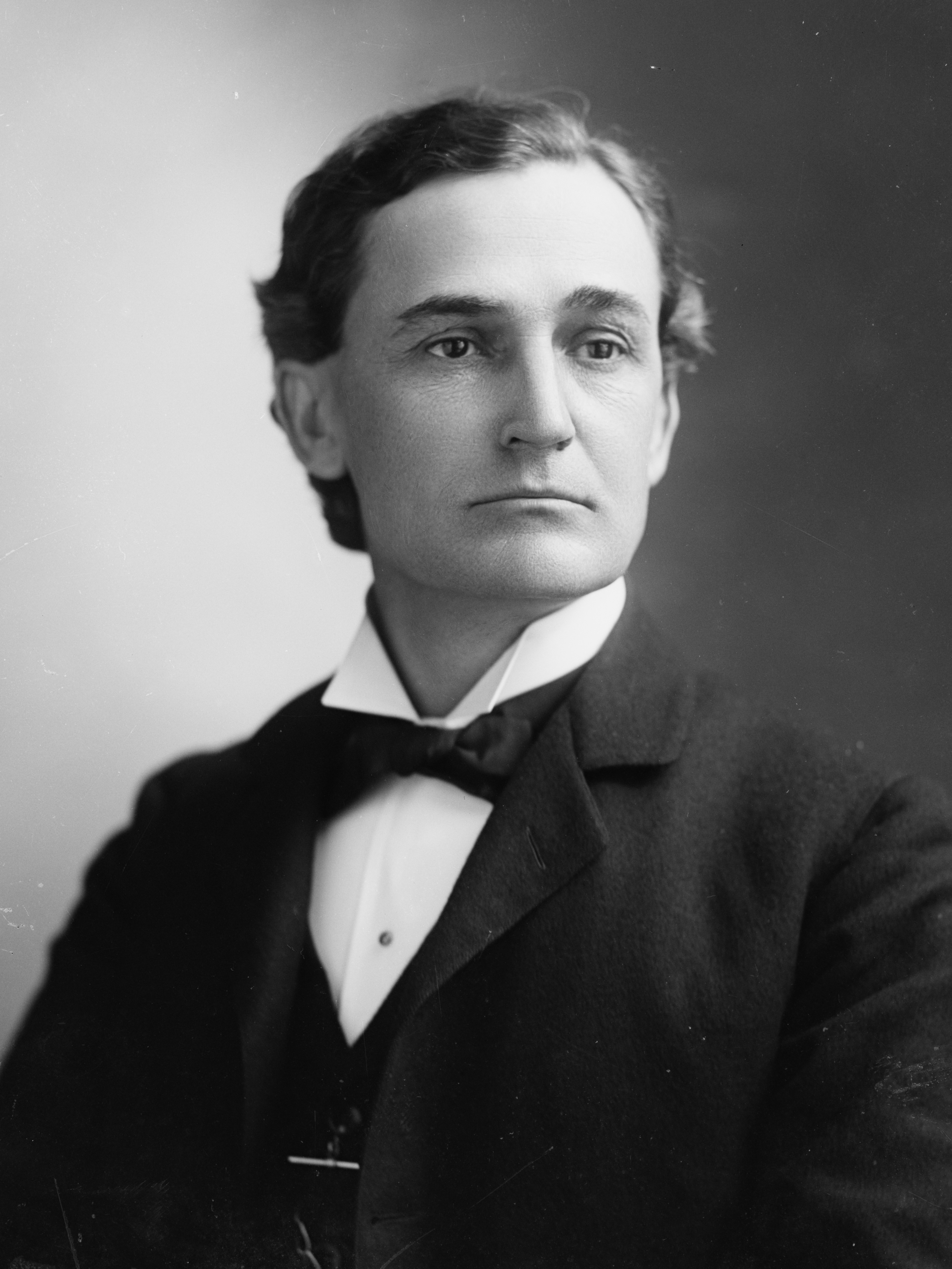
- Morris c. 1894–1901

Senior Judge of the United States District Court for the District of Minnesota
- In office June 30, 1923 – December 16, 1924

Judge of the United States District Court for the District of Minnesota
- In office March 9, 1903 – June 30, 1923
- Appointed by: Theodore Roosevelt
- Preceded by: Seat established by 32 Stat. 795
- Succeeded by: William Alexander Cant

Member of the U.S. House of Representatives from Minnesota's 6th district
- In office March 4, 1897 – March 3, 1903
- Preceded by: Charles A. Towne
- Succeeded by: Clarence Buckman

Personal details
- Born: Robert Page Waller Morris; June 30, 1853 Lynchburg, Virginia, U.S.
- Died: December 16, 1924 (aged 71) Rochester, Minnesota, U.S.
- Resting place: Forest Hill Cemetery; Duluth, Minnesota
- Party: Republican
- Education: Virginia Military Institute
- Occupation: Politician, judge, lawyer, educator
- Known for: 1st Commandant of the Texas A&M University Corps of Cadets

Robert Page Waller Morris (June 30, 1853 – December 16, 1924) was a United States representative from Minnesota and a United States district judge of the United States District Court for the District of Minnesota.

== Early life ==
Born on June 30, 1853, in Lynchburg, Campbell County, Virginia, As a child Morris attended a private school.

== Education ==
=== Virginia Military Institute ===
Morris initially attended the College of William & Mary but finished his studies at Virginia Military Institute. Morris graduated from Virginia Military Institute (VMI) in 1872. He was recognized as the valedictorian, and an academic medalist. Additionally, in 1869, he was initiated into Alpha Tau Omega (ATO), becoming one of the fraternity's earliest members at VMI. After graduating from VMI in 1872, Morris served as an assistant professor of mathematics at the institute from 1872 to 1873.

== Academic career ==
=== Texas Military Institute ===
Morris joined the Texas Military Institute (TMI) as a professor of mathematics in 1873, a position he held until 1876. His tenure at TMI was marked by collaboration with John Garland James, the president of TMI, and Hardaway Hunt Dinwiddie, both fellow VMI graduates and Alpha Tau Omega members.

=== Texas A&M University ===
Morris's career continued at Texas A&M University, where he served as a professor of applied mathematics from 1876 to 1879. During this period, he also fulfilled the role of Corp Commandant for the Texas A&M University Corps of Cadets 1876 to 1877, authoring the Corps' first set of regulations and standardizing the uniforms based on those he wore at VMI. P. L. Downs, Class of 1879 and private secretary to Texas A&M's 1st president, Thomas S. Gathright, was quoted on the president's stance regarding military discipline at the university.

Gathright was wholly opposed to any military discipline. He believed in putting the boys on their honor and trusting them implicitly, and yet Major Morris, as Commandant, insisted upon carrying out the governmental requirements as to military training and that did not altogether suit the president.

==== The Crisp Affair ====
In 1879, the staff at Texas A&M University, including Morris, was released by the Board of Directors following a rift in the faculty. This rift in the faculty came about due to President Thomas S. Gathright's appointment of Cadet John C. Crisp as senior captain, the highest rank in the Texas A&M Corps of Cadets. However, the faculty, led by Professor Alexander Hogg, rejected Crisp’s promotion. This led to a scathing letter writing campaign on the part of Cadet Crisp calling into question Hogg's character and abilities as a professor. This resulted in an emergency hearing by the Texas A&M Board of Directors.

Morris addressed the situation in a hearing before the Board held in Bryan Texas, in November 1879. His testimony was transcribed and printed by the Galveston Daily News. In his testimony, Morris emphasized the need for the board to address these issues thoroughly, criticizing the board's approach and expressing disappointment at the unresolved tensions within the faculty. At one point during his testimony, Morris states directly to the members of the board, 'When a man accepts public office, he should attend to his duties firmly and at all hazards.' This was met with great applause in the hall from the assembled crowd. This led to a member of the board retorting, 'We are going to try the board, too, are we!'

== Legal career ==
Morris began reading law in 1880 and was admitted to the bar and entered private practice in Lynchburg from 1880 to 1886. He was a candidate for the United States House of Representatives of the 49th United States Congress from Virginia in 1884 though not elected. He continued private practice in Duluth, Minnesota starting in 1886. He was a Judge of the Duluth Municipal Court starting in 1889. He was city attorney of Duluth starting in 1894. He was a Judge of the Minnesota District Court for the Eleventh Judicial District from 1895 to 1896.

== Congressional service ==
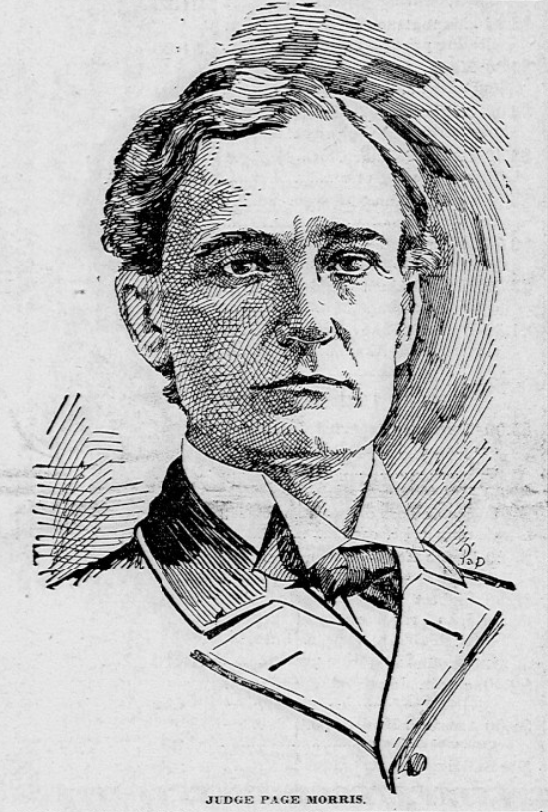
Page Morris in 1896

Morris was elected as a Republican from Minnesota's 6th congressional district to the United States House of Representatives of the 55th, 56th, and 57th United States Congresses, serving from March 4, 1897, to March 3, 1903. He declined to be a candidate for renomination.

== Federal judicial service ==
Morris was nominated by President Theodore Roosevelt on March 5, 1903, to the United States District Court for the District of Minnesota, to a new seat authorized by 32 Stat. 795. He was confirmed by the United States Senate on March 9, 1903, and received his commission the same day. He assumed inactive senior status on June 30, 1923, meaning that while he remained a federal judge, he did not hear any cases or conduct any business for the court. He moved to Pasadena, California, after taking senior status. His service terminated on December 16, 1924, due to his death in Rochester, Olmsted County, Minnesota. He was interred in Forest Hill Cemetery in Duluth.

== Sources ==
- United States Congress. "Page Morris (id: M000986)". Biographical Directory of the United States Congress.

U.S. House of Representatives
Preceded by Charles A. Towne	United States Representative from Minnesota's 6th congressional district 1897–1903	Succeeded by Clarence Buckman
Legal offices
Preceded by Seat established by 32 Stat. 795	Judge of the United States District Court for the District of Minnesota; 1903–1923	Succeeded by William Alexander Cant
