= Brösarp =

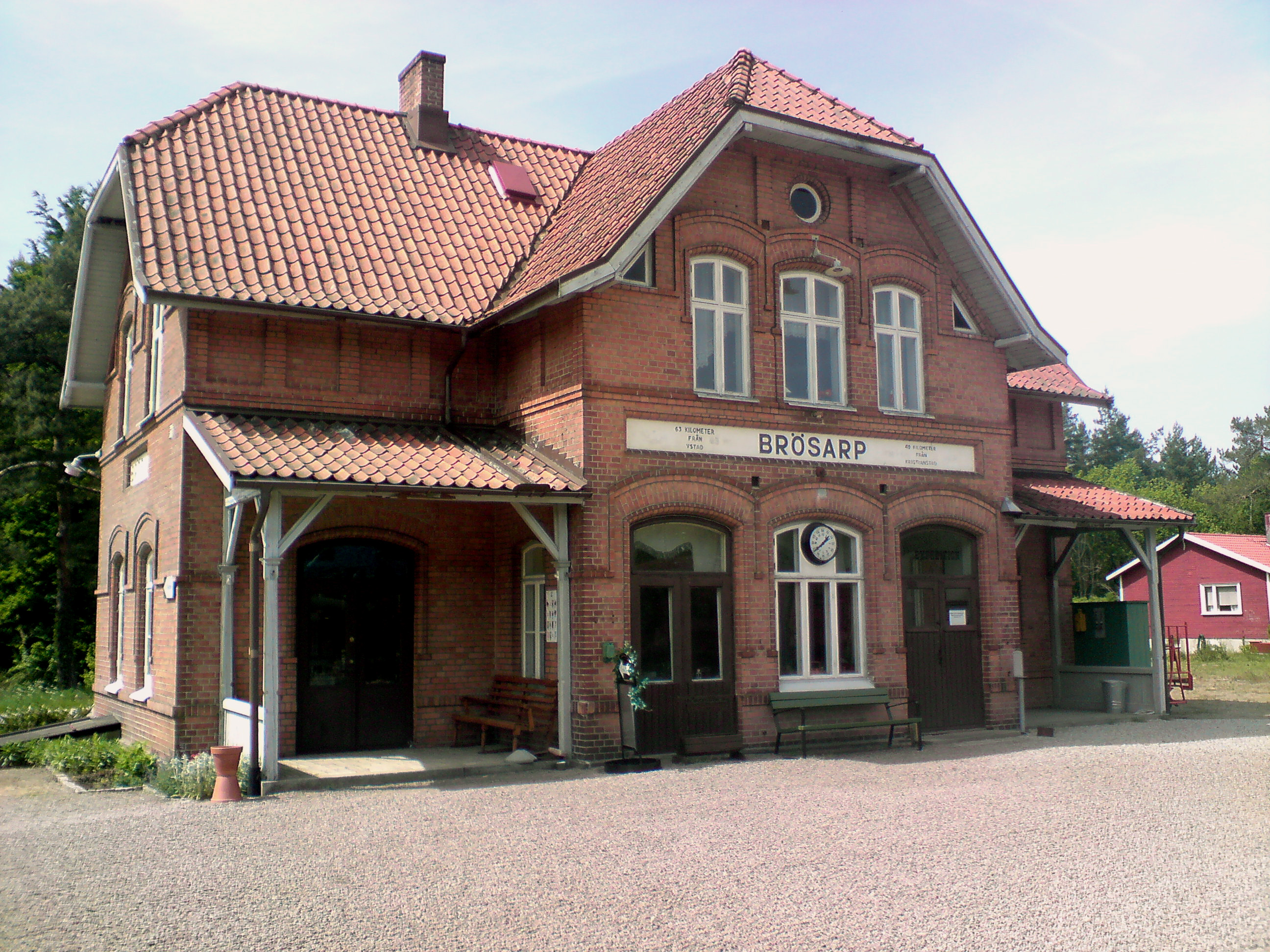
- Brösarp railway station

- Location within Skåne Location within Sweden
- Coordinates: 55°43′N 14°07′E
- Country: Sweden
- Province: Skåne
- County: Skåne County
- Municipality: Tomelilla Municipality

Area
  - Total: 0.82 km^{2} (0.32 sq mi)

Population (31 December 2010)
  - Total: 680
  - Density: 827/km^{2} (2,140/sq mi)
- Time zone: UTC+1 (CET)
  - Summer (DST): UTC+2 (CEST)

Brösarp (Swedish pronunciation: [ˈbrø̂ːsarp]) is a locality situated in Tomelilla Municipality, Skåne County, Sweden near the Hallamölla waterfall, with 680 inhabitants in 2010.
