= List of people diagnosed with Parkinson's disease =

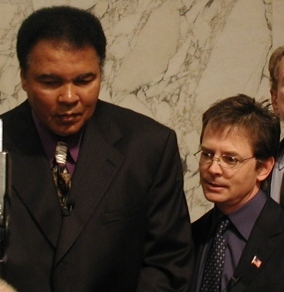
Muhammad Ali and Michael J. Fox testifying before a Senate committee on providing government funding to combat PD.

This is a list of famous people diagnosed with Parkinson's disease.

== Living ==
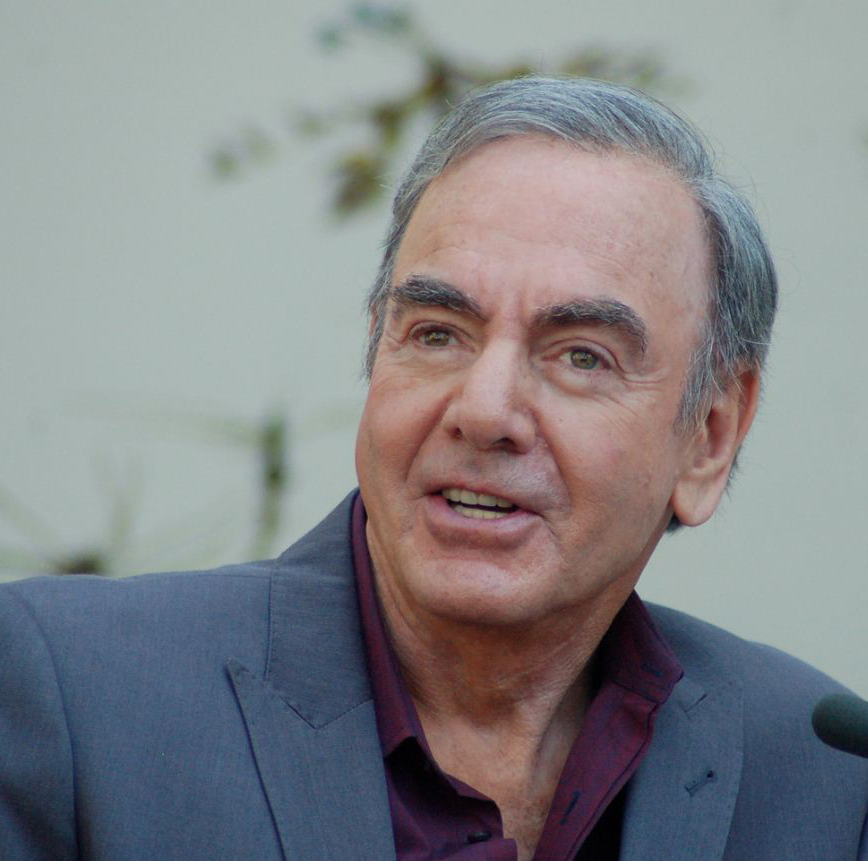
Neil Diamond at Hollywood Walk of Fame induction, August 2012

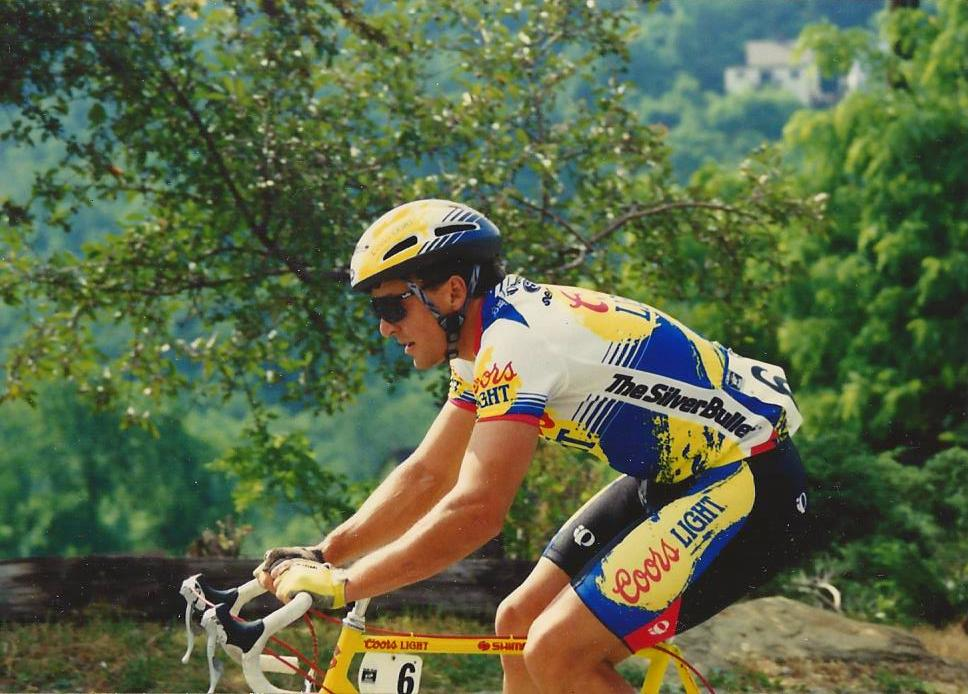
Davis Phinney started a foundation to inspire and inform people with Parkinson's

- Alan Alda (born 1936), American actor.
- Steve Alten (born 1959), American author.
- Barbara Babcock (born 1937), American actress.
- Alex Band (born 1981), American singer (The Calling).
- Daniel Barenboim (born 1942), Argentine-Israeli pianist and conductor.
- Andy Barrie (born 1945), Canadian radio personality.
- Ed Begley Jr. (born 1949), American actor.
- Aidy Boothroyd (born 1971), British footballer and football manager.
- Allan Border (born 1955), Australian cricketer and commentator.
- Cait Brennan (born 1969), American musician and screenwriter.
- Roberto Carcelen (born 1970), Peruvian-American cross-country skier.
- Anne Carson (born 1950), Canadian poet, awarded Nobel Prize in Literature 2026.
- Rory Cellan-Jones (born 1958), British journalist.
- Greg Cipes (born 1980), American voice actor.
- Marc Cohn (born 1959), American singer-songwriter.
- Billy Connolly (born 1942), Scottish comedian and actor.
- Justin Currie (born 1964), Scottish singer (Del Amitri).
- Neil Diamond (born 1941), American singer.
- Tom Dumont (born 1968), American guitarist and producer (No Doubt).
- Frank Elstner (born 1942), German television moderator and entertainer
- Brett Favre (born 1969), American football player.
- Ranulph Fiennes (born 1944), British explorer and writer.
- Michael J. Fox (born 1961), Canadian-American actor.
- Gerald Ganglbauer (born 1958), Austrian publisher.
- Kirk Gibson (born 1957), American baseball player and manager.
- Brian Grant (born 1972), American basketball player.
- Ahman Green (born 1977), American football running back
- Morten Harket (born 1959), Norwegian singer (A-ha).
- Fergus Henderson (born 1963), English chef.
- Poul-Erik Høyer Larsen (born 1965), Danish retired badminton player and sports administrator.
- Dom Irrera (born 1948), American actor and comedian.
- Martha Johnson (born 1950), Canadian singer (Martha and the Muffins).
- Mick Jones (born 1944), English guitarist (Foreigner).
- Richie Kavanagh (born 1949), Irish singer.
- Billy Kennedy (born 1964), American basketball coach.
- Jansher Khan (born 1969), Pakistani squash player.
- Michael Kinsley (born 1951), American journalist and commentator.
- Bernie Kosar (born 1963), American football player (Cleveland Browns).
- Steve Ludzik (born 1961), Canadian ice hockey player and coach.
- Dean Malenko (born 1960), American professional wrestler.
- Jim Mallon (born 1956), American television producer (Mystery Science Theater 3000).
- Mark Mardell (born 1957), British broadcaster.
- Leonard Maltin (born 1950), American film critic and film historian.
- Paul Mayhew-Archer (born 1953), British radio and television comedy producer and writer.
- Steve McCoy, American radio host.
- Antanas Mockus (born 1952), Colombian politician.
- Jeremy Paxman (born 1950), British broadcaster.
- Brent Peterson (born 1958), Canadian ice hockey player and coach.
- Davis Phinney (born 1959), American cyclist.
- Bill Plaschke (born 1958), American sports journalist.
- Rachel Reid (born 1980), Canadian romance author.
- Ed Rendell (born 1944), American politician.
- Mark Richt (born 1960), American college football coach.
- Freddie Roach (born 1960), American boxer.
- Linda Ronstadt (born 1946), American singer.
- José E. Serrano (born 1943), American politician.
- Rick Shapiro (born 1959), American comedian and actor.
- Carly Simon (born 1943), American singer and songwriter.
- Paul Sinha (born 1970), British comedian.
- Daryl Stuermer (born 1952), American guitarist (Genesis).
- Kevin Tighe (born 1944), American actor (Emergency!).
- Glenn Tipton (born 1947), English guitarist (Judas Priest).
- Lars von Trier (born 1956), Danish film director and screenwriter.
- John Walker (born 1952), New Zealand runner.

== Deceased ==
- Muhammad Ali (1942–2016; aged 74), American boxer.
- Brock Adams (1927–2004; aged 77), American politician.
- Jack Anderson (1922–2005; aged 83), American columnist.
- Al Arbour (1932–2015; aged 82), Canadian ice hockey player and coach.
- Jim Backus (1913–1989; aged 76), American actor.
- Roger Bannister (1929–2018; aged 88), English Olympic runner and neurologist.
- Joanne Chory (1955–2024), American plant biologist and geneticist.
- José Bernal (1925–2010; aged 85), Cuban-American artist.
- Sir John Betjeman (1906–1984; aged 77), CBE, British poet.
- Boyi Bhimanna (1911–2005; aged 94), Indian poet.
- Bhumibol Adulyadej (1927–2016; aged 88), Thai king.
- Whit Bissell (1909–1996; aged 86), American actor.
- Margaret Bourke-White (1904–1971; aged 67), American photographer.
- Jack Buck (1924–2002; aged 77), American sportscaster.
- George H. W. Bush (1924–2018; aged 94), American politician, 41st president of the United States.
- Lou Butera (1937–2015; aged 78) American professional pool player.
- Roger Caron (1938–2012; aged 73), Canadian bank robber.
- Owen Chamberlain (1920–2006; aged 85), American physicist.
- Barney Childs (1909–2000; aged 73), American composer and teacher.
- Prince Claus of the Netherlands (1926–2002; aged 76), Dutch prince consort.
- Alf Clausen (1941–2025; aged 84), American film and television composer.
- Joe Cook (1890–1959; aged 69), American actor.
- Jeff Cook (1949–2022; aged 73), American guitarist (Alabama).
- George Coulouris (1903–1989; aged 85), English actor.
- André Courrèges (1923–2016; aged 92), French fashion designer.
- Salvador Dalí (1904–1989; aged 84), Spanish painter.
- Harry Dalton (1928–2005; aged 77), American baseball executive.
- Joyce Davidson (1931–2020; aged 89), Canadian-American television personality and producer.
- Deng Xiaoping (1904–1997; aged 92), Chinese politician.
- Purushottam Laxman Deshpande (1919–2000; aged 80), Indian writer and humorist.
- Rochford Devenish-Meares (1948–2026; aged 78), Australian rules footballer
- Basil D'Oliveira (1931–2011; aged 80), South African-born English cricketer.
- James Doohan (1920–2005; aged 85), Canadian actor.
- Robert Downey Sr. (1936–2021; aged 85), American filmmaker and actor.
- Lesley Elliott (1946–2022; aged 76), New Zealand domestic violence and abuse campaigner.
- Joe Ely (1947–2025; aged 78), American musician.
- Lane Evans (1951–2014; aged 63), American politician.
- William Everson (1912–1994; aged 81), American poet.
- Francisco Franco (1892–1975; aged 82), Spanish dictator.
- Doug Furnas (1959–2012); aged 52), American Professional Wrestler and Powerlifter
- Booth Gardner (1936–2013; aged 76), American politician.
- Michael Gerson (1964–2022; aged 58), American journalist and speechwriter.
- Carlos Gomes (1932–2005; aged 73), Portuguese footballer.
- Billy Graham (1918–2018; aged 99), American evangelist.
- Alan Greenspan (1926–2026; aged 100), United States Federal Reserve Chairman.
- Forrest Gregg (1933–2019; aged 85), American professional football player and coach who played offensive tackle for 16 seasons in the National Football League with the Green Bay Packers and Dallas Cowboys.
- Walter Gretzky (1938–2021; aged 82), Canadian philanthropist and author.
- Lizzie Grey (1958–2019; aged 60), American singer (London, Spiders & Snakes).
- Grace Griffith (1956–2021; aged 64), American singer.
- Andrew Grove (1938–2016; aged 79), American businessman.
- Lou Groza (1924–2000; aged 76), American football player.
- Eitan Haber (1940–2020; aged 80), Israeli journalist and publicist. Also had colon and pancreatic cancer.
- Gunther von Hagens (1945–2026), German anatomist.
- Shay Healy (1943–2021; aged 78), Irish songwriter and broadcaster.
- Nathan Heard (1937–2004; aged 67), American novelist.
- George Roy Hill (1921–2002; aged 81), American film director.
- Chester Himes (1909–1984; aged 75), American writer.
- Bob Hoskins (1942–2014; aged 71), English actor.
- Masud Husain Khan (1919–2010; aged 91), Indian linguist.
- Josefa Iloilo (1920–2011; aged 90), Fijian politician, president of Fiji.
- Johnny Isakson (1944–2021; aged 76), United States Senator from Georgia.
- Sir Alec Issigonis (1906–1988; aged 81), British-Greek car designer.
- Jesse Jackson (1941–2026; aged 84), American civil rights activist. Diagnosis was later changed to progressive supranuclear palsy, a rare disease with symptoms that mimics Parkinson's.
- Mary Jackson (1910–2005; aged 95), American actress.
- David Jacobs (1936–2013; aged 87), British radio and television presenter.
- Frank Jenner (1903–1977; aged 73), Australian sailor and evangelist.
- Dave Jennings (1952–2013; aged 61), American football player.
- Ba Jin (1904–2005; aged 100), Chinese writer.
- Pope John Paul II (1920–2005; aged 84), Polish pope.
- Dean Jones (1931–2015; aged 84), American actor.
- Erland Josephson (1923–2012; aged 88), Swedish actor and author.
- Pauline Kael (1919–2001; aged 82), American film critic.
- Casey Kasem (1932–2014; aged 82), American radio disc jockey and voice actor.
- Frank Kelly (1938–2016; aged 77), Irish actor.
- Ray Kennedy (1951–2021; aged 70), English footballer.
- Deborah Kerr (1921–2007; aged 86), British actress.
- Guy Kibbee (1882–1956; aged 74), American actor.
- George Kirby (1923–1995; aged 72) American comedian.
- Jimmy Knepper (1927–2003; aged 75), American jazz trombonist.
- Steve Kragthorpe (1965–2024, aged 59), American football coach.
- Ted Kroll (1919–2002; aged 82), American professional golfer.
- Gerald M. Levin (1939–2024; aged 84), American businessman.
- James Levine (1943–2021; aged 77), American conductor.
- Richard Lewis (1947–2024; aged 76), American comedian and actor.
- John Lindsay (1921–2000; aged 79), American politician.
- Walter Lord (1917–2002; aged 84), American author.
- Margo MacDonald (1943–2014; aged 70), Scottish politician.
- Luis Marden (1913–2003; aged 90), Italian-American photographer.
- Carlo Maria Martini (1927–2012; aged 85), Cardinal Archbishop Emeritus of Milan, theologian and biblical exegete.
- Ferdy Mayne (1916–1998; aged 81), German actor.
- William Masters (1915–2001; aged 85), American gynaecologist and sex researcher.
- Eugene McCarthy (1916–2005; aged 89), American politician.
- Joseph M. McDade (1931–2017; aged 85), American politician and former Congressman from NE Pennsylvania.
- Ralph McQuarrie (1929–2012; aged 82), American artist.
- Barry Melrose (1956–2026), Canadian-American ice hockey player and broadcaster.
- Tony Mendez (1940–2019; aged 78), American CIA Officer portrayed in Argo.
- Zell Miller (1932–2018; aged 86), American former governor of the state of Georgia.
- Alois Mock (1934–2017; aged 82), Austrian politician.
- Leo Monahan (1926–2013; aged 86), American sports journalist.
- Kenneth More (1914–1982; aged 67), English actor.
- Robert Mueller (1944–2026; aged 81), American lawyer and FBI director.
- Knowlton Nash (1927–2014; aged 86), Canadian television journalist and author.
- Giulio Natta (1903–1979; aged 76), Italian chemist.
- Dame Anna Neagle (1904–1986; aged 81), English actress.
- Ozzy Osbourne (1948–2025; aged 76), English singer (Black Sabbath).
- Norman Panama (1914–2003; aged 88), American writer, producer and director.
- Dave Parker (1951–2025; aged 74), American baseball player.
- Joe Pasternak (1901–1991; aged 89), American film director.
- Mervyn Peake (1911–1968; aged 57), English author and illustrator.
- George Perles (1934–2020; aged 85), American football player, defensive coordinator for the Pittsburgh Steelers, head football coach at Michigan State University.
- Ray Perrault (1926–2008; aged 82), Canadian politician who served as Senator from British Columbia.
- Valerie Perrine (1943–2026; age 82), American actress and model.
- Richard Perry (1942–2024; aged 82), American record producer.
- Enoch Powell (1912–1998; aged 85), British politician.
- Larry Powers (1939–2015; aged 76), American bodybuilder.
- Vincent Price (1911–1993; aged 82), American actor, also had lung cancer.
- Hans Ras (1926–2003; aged 77), Dutch linguist and academic.
- Bill Rasmussen (1932–2026; aged 93), American sports network director and ESPN co-founder.
- Sir Michael Redgrave (1908–1985; aged 77), English actor.
- John Rosenbaum (1934–2003; aged 69), American artist.
- M. Scott Peck (1936–2005; aged 69), American psychiatrist and best-selling author.
- Janet Reno (1938–2016; aged 78), Attorney General of the United States (1993–2001).
- Matt Robinson (1937–2002; aged 65), American actor.
- Masa Saito (1942–2018; aged 76), Japanese professional wrestler.
- Guy Scott (1944–2026), Zambian politician, former acting president of Zambia.
- Leonid Shamkovich (1923–2005; aged 81), USSR Chess Grandmaster.
- Walter Sisulu (1912–2003; aged 90), South African freedom fighter.
- Sir Osbert Sitwell (1892–1969; aged 76), English writer.
- A. J. P. Taylor (1906–1990; aged 84), British historian and writer.
- Jerry Sloan (1942–2020; aged 78), American professional basketball player and former Member of NBA.
- John Stapleton (1946–2025), British journalist and television presenter
- Jean-Louis Tauran (1943–2018; aged 75), Cardinal-Priest of Sant'Apollinare alle Terme Neroniane-Alessandrine, president of the Pontifical Council for Interreligious Dialogue in the Roman Curia.
- Terry-Thomas (1911–1990; aged 78), English actor.
- Meldrim Thomson Jr. (1912–2001; aged 89), Republican Governor of New Hampshire.
- Richard Thompson (1957–2016; aged 58), American illustrator and Reuben-award-winning cartoonist.
- Guðjón Þórðarson (1955–2026; aged 71), Icelandic football player and manager
- Jeremy Thorpe (1930–2014; aged 85), British politician and leader of the Liberal Party (1967–1976).
- Pat Torpey (1953–2018; aged 64), American drummer for the band Mr. Big.
- Pierre Trudeau (1919–2000; aged 80), 15th Prime Minister of Canada. Also had prostate cancer.
- Mo Udall (1922–1998; aged 76), Member of the US House of Representatives.
- Tim Wall (1904–1981; aged 76), Australian cricketer.
- George Wallace (1919–1998; aged 79), American politician and former governor of Alabama.
- Maurice White (1941–2016; aged 74), American singer, musician, founder of R&B band Earth, Wind & Fire.
- Albert Whitlock (1915–1999; aged 84), British motion picture matte artist.
- Edward Winter (1937–2001; aged 63), American actor.
- Harvey D. Williams (1930–2020; aged 90), African-American U.S. Army major general and activist, Deputy Inspector General of the U.S. Army (1980).
- Robin Williams (1951–2014; aged 63), American actor.
- Richard Winters (1918–2011; aged 92), American War Hero. WWII veteran and basis for book Band of Brothers and the subsequent HBO miniseries.
- Farnsworth Wright (1888–1940; aged 51), American editor.
- Gary Wright (1943–2023, aged 80), American singer-songwriter.
- Eurig Wyn (1944–2019, aged 74), Welsh politician

== Retrospective ==
Historical figures have been theorized to have had Parkinson's, including English philosopher Thomas Hobbes, Adolf Hitler, and Mao Zedong.

== See also ==
- Lewy body dementia, which includes Parkinson's disease dementia
