= Hallamölla =

Waterfall in Sweden

Coordinates: 55.7083°N 14.0183°E

Hallamölla is the biggest waterfall in Skåne County, Sweden with a height of 23 metres. The waterfall is situated in the Verkeån river, about 6 km southwest of Brösarp. The rock in the waterfall is made of sandstone. The waterfall is named after its watermill, whose history dates to the 15th century and is open to the public.

== Gallery ==
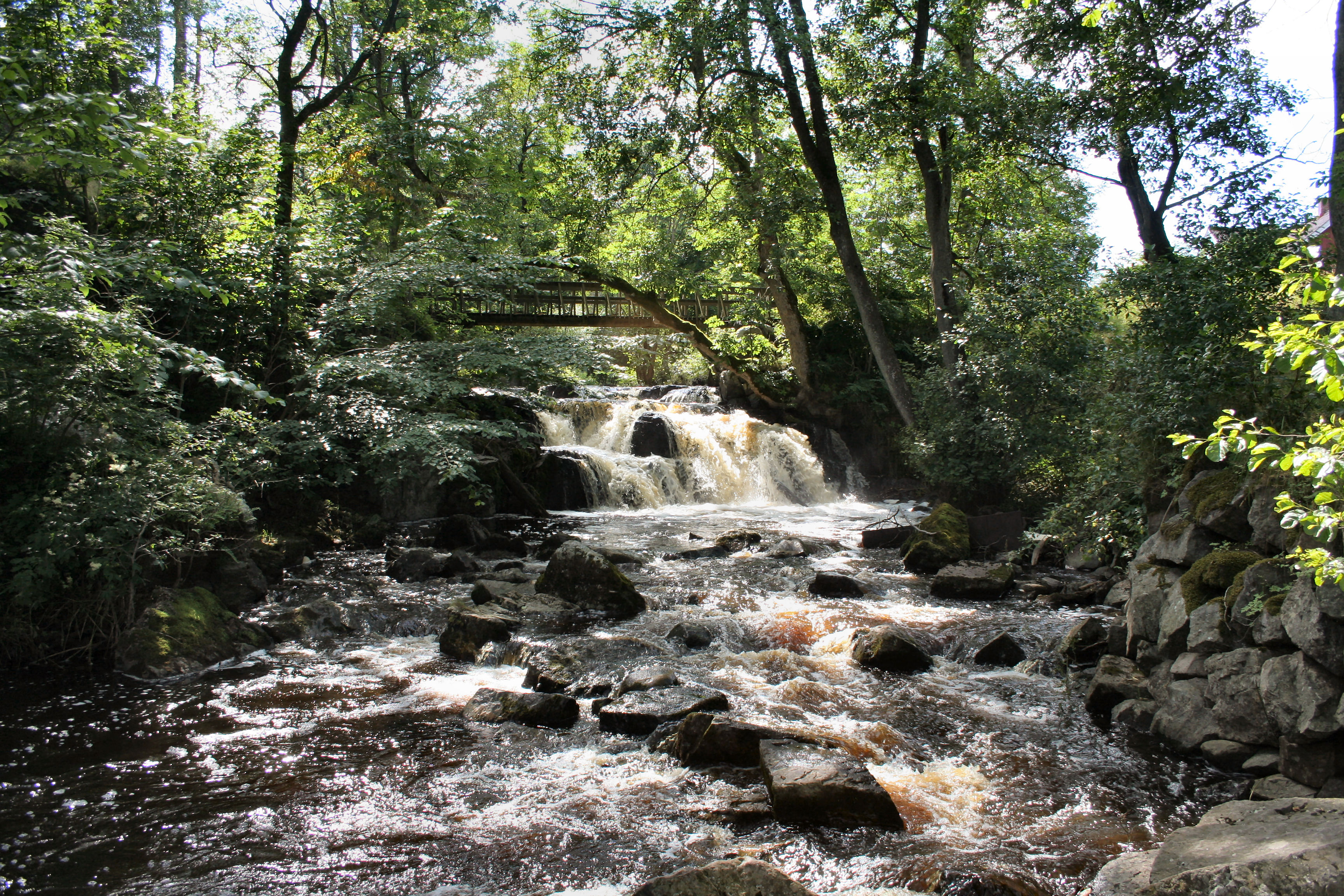
Hallamölla waterfall

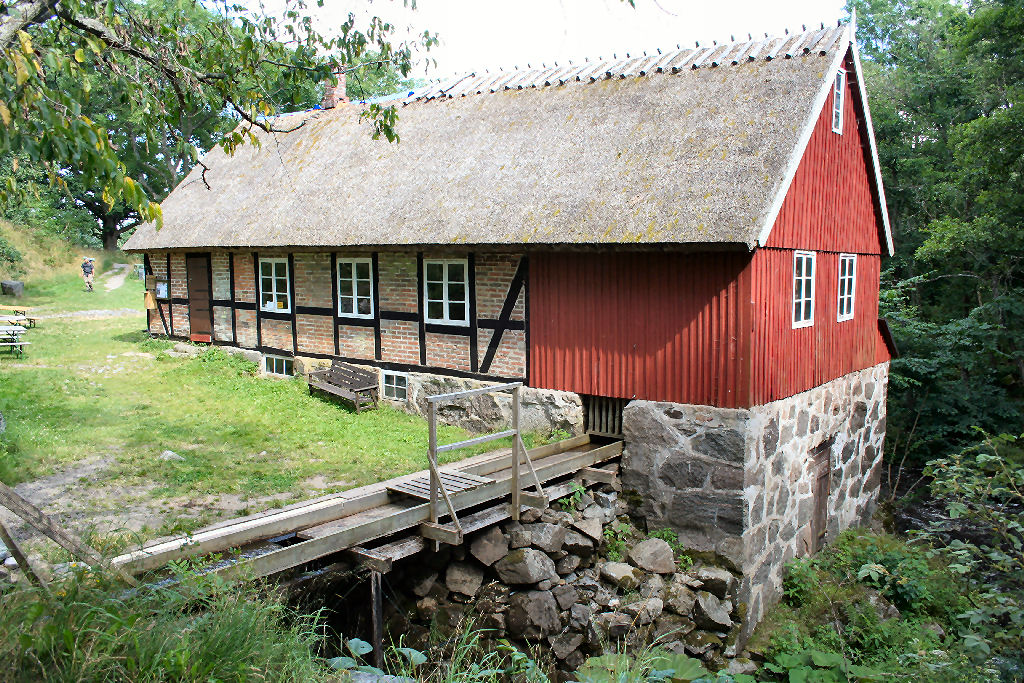
Hallamölla watermill

== See also ==
- List of waterfalls
