= Charles August Lindbergh =

American politician (1859–1924)

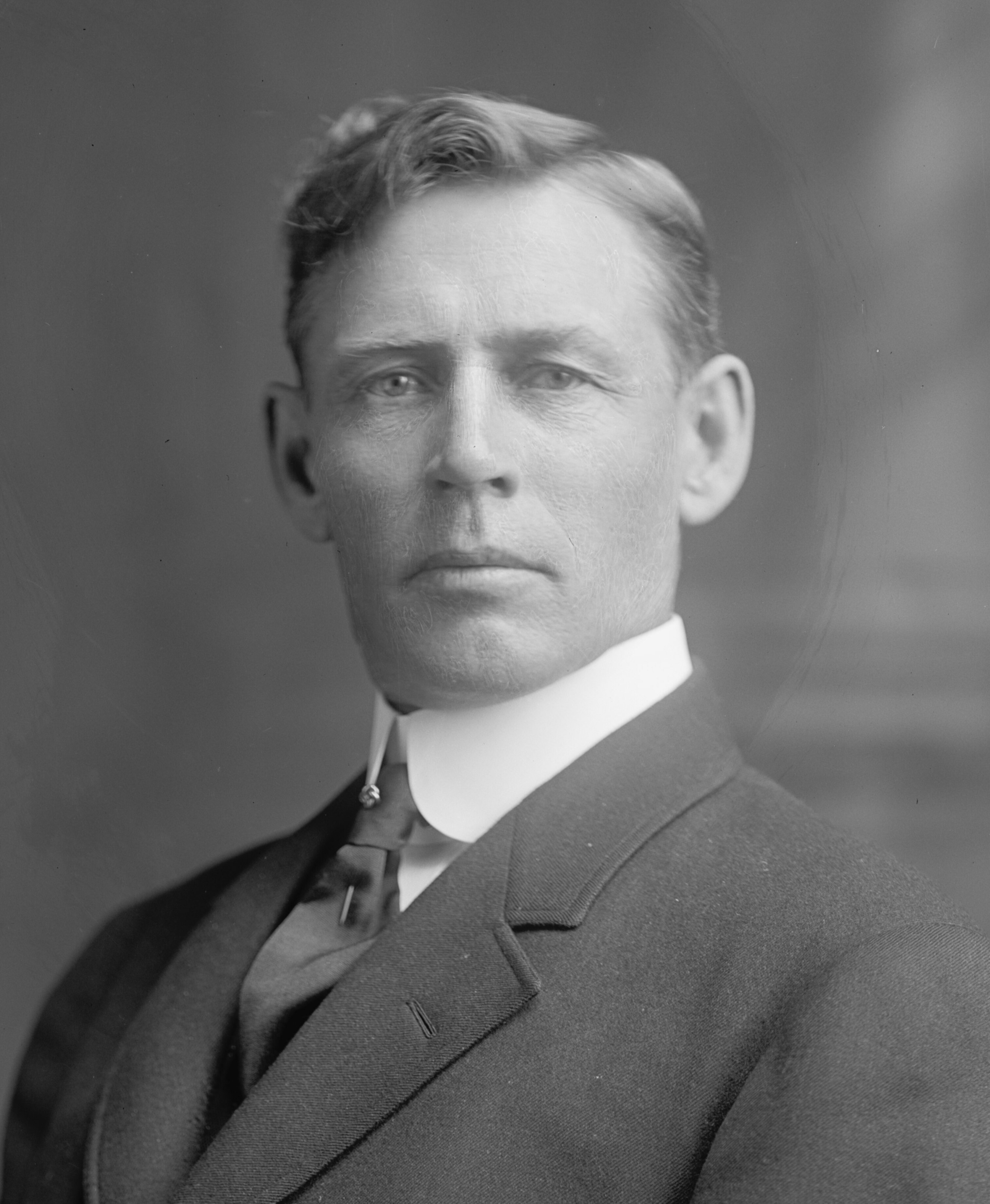
- Portrait by Harris & Ewing, c. 1907–1917

Member of the U.S. House of Representatives from Minnesota's 6th district
- In office March 4, 1907 – March 3, 1917
- Preceded by: Clarence Buckman
- Succeeded by: Harold Knutson

Personal details
- Born: Carl Månsson; January 20, 1859 Stockholm, Sweden
- Died: May 24, 1924 (aged 65) Crookston, Minnesota, US
- Resting place: Lakewood Cemetery, Minneapolis, Minnesota, US
- Party: Republican
- Other political affiliations: Progressive (1912); Nonpartisan League (1918); Farmer–Labor (1924)
- Spouses: Mary LaFond (m. 1887; died 1898); Evangeline Lodge Land Lindbergh (m. 1901; sep. 1918)
- Children: 4, including Charles
- Parent: August Lindbergh (father)
- Education: University of Michigan Law School

Charles August Lindbergh (born Carl Månsson; January 20, 1859 – May 24, 1924) was a United States congressman from Minnesota's 6th congressional district from 1907 to 1917. He is known for his opposition to the 1913 Federal Reserve Act, which he warned would hand control of the economy to "a purely profiteering group" operating "for the sole purpose of obtaining the greatest possible profits from the use of other people's money." Lindbergh opposed American entry into World War I, arguing that the United States should avoid foreign entanglements. Lindbergh is best known as the father of famed aviator Charles Lindbergh.

== Early life ==
Lindbergh was born Carl Månsson in Stockholm, Sweden, to Lovisa Carlén, the 19-year-old mistress of Ola Månsson, a peasant member of the Riksdag of the Estates and a bank manager. When accused of bribery and embezzlement, Ola Månsson changed his name to August Lindbergh, left his wife and seven children, and emigrated to the United States with his mistress and their illegitimate infant son, Carl, in 1859. Lovisa became Louisa and young Carl became Charles August Lindbergh.

They settled in Melrose, Minnesota, and had six more children together. August worked as a farmer and a blacksmith for 26 years before marrying Louisa in 1885, having become a widower in 1864 with the death of his first wife in Sweden.

Charles August Lindbergh studied law at the University of Michigan Law School, graduating in 1883, and was admitted to the bar that same year.

== Political career ==
Lindbergh served as prosecuting attorney for Morrison County, Minnesota, from 1891 to 1893. He was elected to the United States House of Representatives in 1906 as a Republican, serving in the 60th, 61st, 62nd, 63rd, and 64th congresses. In 1912, he supported Theodore Roosevelt's unsuccessful third party Progressive bid for the White House. In 1916 he unsuccessfully campaigned for a seat in the United States Senate.

=== Opposition to the Federal Reserve ===
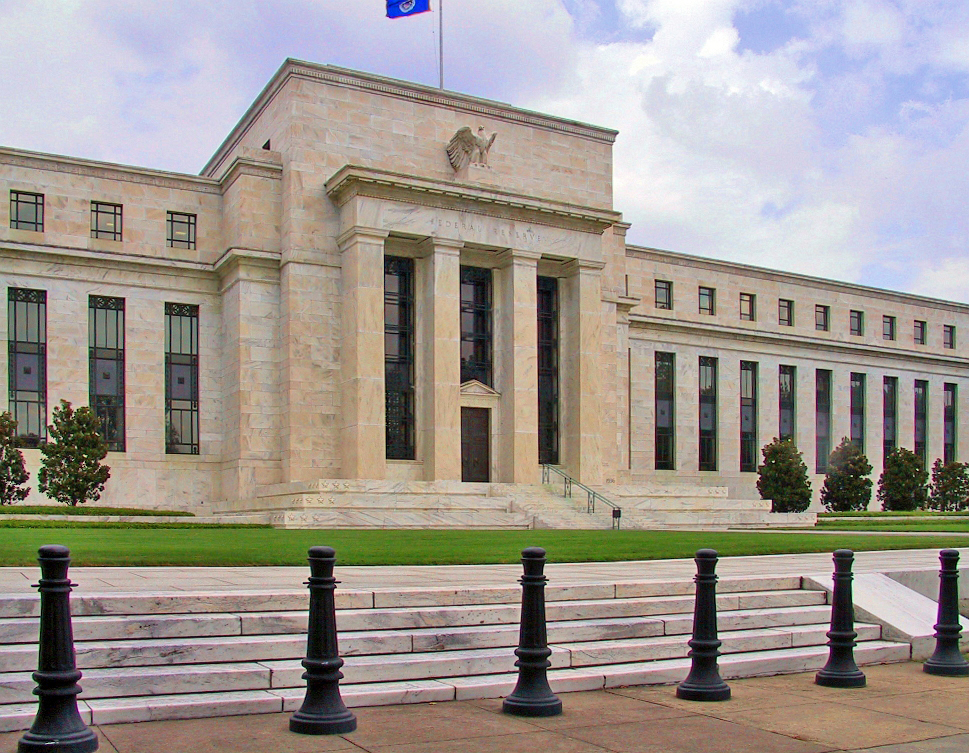
Lindbergh was an outspoken critic of the Federal Reserve

In Congress, Lindbergh was one of the first outspoken critics of the Federal Reserve. His stature grew when he was featured in an article in The American Magazine: "It was a Swede from Minnesota who first raised in Congress the hue-and-cry of the Money Trust Hunt—'a Swede who dreams', a fellow member described him—Charles A. Lindbergh." Lindbergh declared, "This Act establishes the most gigantic trust on Earth. When the President signs this bill, the invisible government by the Monetary Power will be legalized, the people may not know it immediately, but the day of reckoning is only a few years removed ... The worst legislative crime of the ages is perpetrated by this banking bill." In 1917 Lindbergh brought articles of impeachment against members of the Federal Reserve Board of Governors, including Paul Warburg and William P. G. Harding, charging that they were involved "... in a conspiracy to violate the Constitution and laws of the United States..."

In 1913 Lindbergh published Banking, Currency, and the Money Trust, which attacked the Federal Reserve and big banks.

=== Opposition to World War I ===
When World War I broke out in Europe in 1914, Lindbergh was vocal that the United States should not become involved. In 1916 he lost his United States Senate bid to an opponent who openly advocated American intervention in Europe. In March 1917, Lindbergh was one of only 14 congressmen to vote against the arming of United States merchant ships. By 1917, the third year of the Great War, Lindbergh's son was aged 16, which meant some possibility of conscription.

He also wrote an anti-war polemic titled Why is Your Country at War? In 1918, under the Comstock laws, federal agents destroyed the printing plates of both publications. The latter was posthumously released in 1934 under the revised title Your Country at War, and What Happens to You After a War. In the first chapter, Lindbergh wrote, "It is impossible according to the big press to be a true American unless you are pro-British. If you are really for America first, last and all time, and solely for America and for the masses primarily, then you are classed as pro-German by the big press which is supported by the speculators." These beliefs would influence his son, who would later famously oppose American intervention in World War II.

=== Gubernatorial campaigns ===
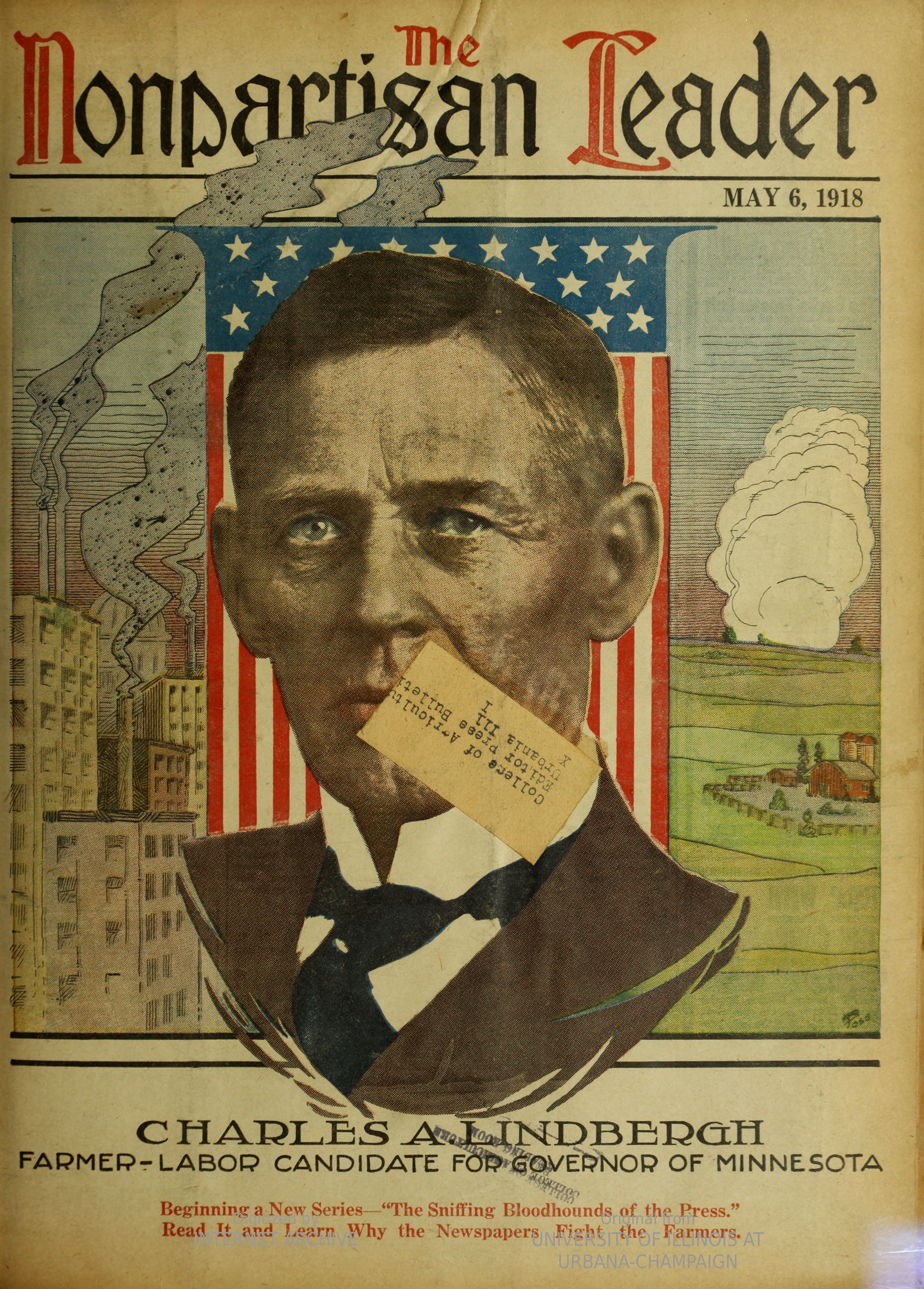
Lindbergh on the cover of The Nonpartisan Leader, May 6, 1918

In 1918, Lindbergh ran for governor of Minnesota as a Republican against the Republican incumbent, Joseph A. A. Burnquist. Lindbergh was endorsed by the Farmers Nonpartisan League, which called for government ownership of some agricultural enterprises, such as mills, plants, and grain elevators. Many of his campaign speeches were attended by thousands of supporters. But due to his opposition to American entry into the first World War and his connection to the Socialistic Farmers Nonpartisan League, Lindbergh was attacked by the press and there were often protesters who pelted him with eggs and rocks. Lindbergh's son Charles worked as his driver and "never forgot the hostile crowds that harassed his father, or the way the press derided him." Lindbergh's 1918 bid for governor ultimately failed.

Lindbergh was shot at by the mob, had his speeches censored by the state, was widely lied about in the press, was condemned by the Catholic Church, was banned from campaigning in 19 of 86 counties, faced an opponent who used Public Safety Commission money to finance "loyalty meetings" (campaign rallies), and faced off against the Republican establishment and a supermajority of Democratic voters, who joined the Republican primary to vote against Lindbergh. Nevertheless, Lindbergh won 150,000 votes (43%) in the primary. NPL leadership was overjoyed, as their first election run in the state had nearly won.

In 1924, Lindbergh was once again a candidate for governor on the Minnesota Farmer–Labor Party ticket. Lindbergh's campaign was cut short by his death. He would have been the first Minnesota governor from the party if he had been elected.

== Personal life ==
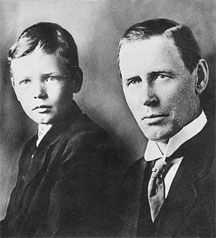
Lindbergh with his son Charles

In 1887, Lindbergh married Mary LaFond, with whom he had three daughters, Edith, Lillian and Eva. Edith died at less than one year old. Mary LaFond died in 1898. In 1901, Charles married Evangeline Lodge Land (1876–1954). In 1902, they settled in Little Falls, Minnesota, where Lindbergh established a successful law practice. Evangeline often had difficulty raising her two surviving step-daughters, who both eventually moved away. Evangeline often threatened Lindbergh with divorce; he caved in to her demands, fearing a divorce would cost him his seat in Congress. After further problems, Evangeline began to live in a separate residence in 1909. They separated in 1918, their only child being the famous aviator Charles Lindbergh, who also became an antiwar leader.

== Death ==
Lindbergh died on May 24, 1924, in Crookston, Minnesota, of brain cancer. He was cremated and placed in the columbarium at Lakewood Cemetery in Minneapolis. According to his wishes, son Charles scattered his ashes near Sauk River over the place where the first Lindbergh home once stood.

U.S. House of Representatives
Preceded by Clarence Buckman	Member of the U.S. House of Representatives from Minnesota's 6th congressional district 1907–1917	Succeeded by Harold Knutson
