= Tomelilla =

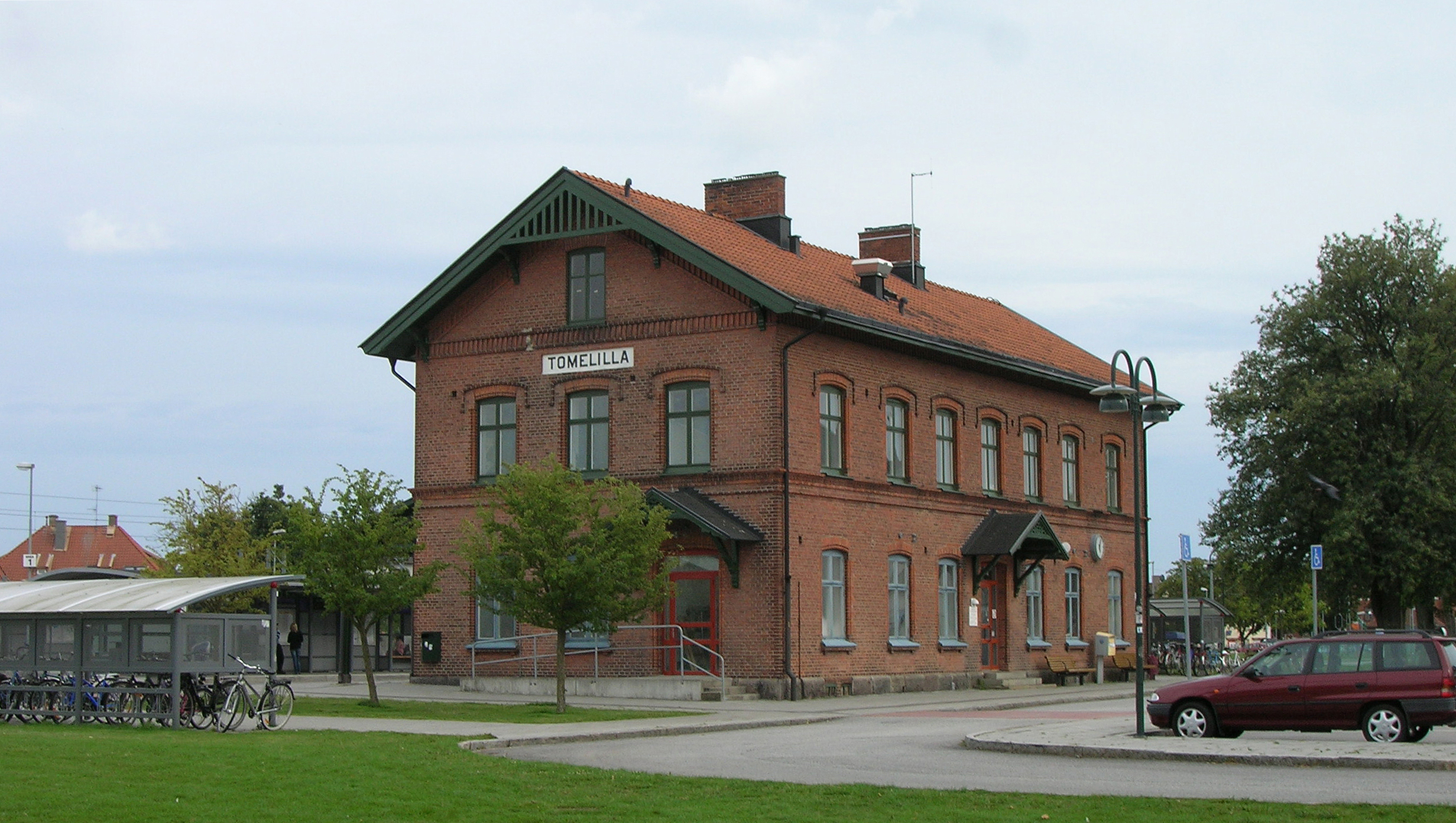
- Railway station

- Coat of arms

- Location within Skåne Location within Sweden
- Coordinates: 55°33′N 13°57′E
- Country: Sweden
- Province: Skåne
- County: Skåne County
- Municipality: Tomelilla Municipality

Area
  - Total: 5.68 km^{2} (2.19 sq mi)

Population (31 December 2010)
  - Total: 6,444
  - Density: 1,134/km^{2} (2,940/sq mi)
- Time zone: UTC+1 (CET)
  - Summer (DST): UTC+2 (CEST)

Tomelilla (Swedish pronunciation: [ˈtʊ̂mːɛˌlɪlːa, tʊmɛˈlɪ̂lːa]) is a locality and the seat of Tomelilla Municipality in Skåne County, Sweden with 6,444 inhabitants in 2010.

== Climate ==
Tomelilla has an oceanic climate with very mild winters by Nordic standards due to its southerly latitude near the sea. The Bollerup station closed in 2021.

Climate data for Bollerup; (2002–2020 averages; extremes since 1948)
Month	Jan	Feb	Mar	Apr	May	Jun	Jul	Aug	Sep	Oct	Nov	Dec	Year
Record high °C (°F)	9.9 (49.8)	13.5 (56.3)	19.0 (66.2)	25.1 (77.2)	28.0 (82.4)	31.2 (88.2)	32.1 (89.8)	33.1 (91.6)	26.7 (80.1)	22.3 (72.1)	15.5 (59.9)	10.9 (51.6)	33.1 (91.6)
Mean maximum °C (°F)	7.0 (44.6)	7.7 (45.9)	12.9 (55.2)	18.7 (65.7)	23.4 (74.1)	26.9 (80.4)	28.3 (82.9)	28.0 (82.4)	23.3 (73.9)	17.3 (63.1)	12.1 (53.8)	8.3 (46.9)	29.5 (85.1)
Mean daily maximum °C (°F)	2.6 (36.7)	3.0 (37.4)	6.3 (43.3)	11.8 (53.2)	16.9 (62.4)	20.7 (69.3)	23.1 (73.6)	22.5 (72.5)	18.5 (65.3)	12.4 (54.3)	7.8 (46.0)	4.5 (40.1)	12.5 (54.5)
Daily mean °C (°F)	0.5 (32.9)	0.7 (33.3)	3.0 (37.4)	7.2 (45.0)	11.8 (53.2)	15.5 (59.9)	17.9 (64.2)	17.8 (64.0)	14.3 (57.7)	8.4 (47.1)	5.6 (42.1)	2.5 (36.5)	8.8 (47.8)
Mean daily minimum °C (°F)	−1.6 (29.1)	−1.6 (29.1)	−0.4 (31.3)	2.6 (36.7)	6.7 (44.1)	10.2 (50.4)	12.7 (54.9)	13.1 (55.6)	10.1 (50.2)	6.3 (43.3)	3.4 (38.1)	0.5 (32.9)	5.2 (41.3)
Mean minimum °C (°F)	−10.8 (12.6)	−8.5 (16.7)	−6.6 (20.1)	−2.4 (27.7)	1.0 (33.8)	5.3 (41.5)	8.1 (46.6)	7.9 (46.2)	4.3 (39.7)	−1.3 (29.7)	−3.8 (25.2)	−7.2 (19.0)	−13.0 (8.6)
Record low °C (°F)	−19.2 (−2.6)	−18.8 (−1.8)	−17.1 (1.2)	−8.6 (16.5)	−2.0 (28.4)	1.2 (34.2)	0.2 (32.4)	0.4 (32.7)	−1.1 (30.0)	−6.0 (21.2)	−10.0 (14.0)	−20.1 (−4.2)	−20.1 (−4.2)
Average precipitation mm (inches)	65.2 (2.57)	47.6 (1.87)	37.5 (1.48)	27.7 (1.09)	38.7 (1.52)	54.7 (2.15)	59.0 (2.32)	70.3 (2.77)	50.0 (1.97)	83.9 (3.30)	70.1 (2.76)	69.0 (2.72)	673.7 (26.52)
Source 1: SMHI Open Data
Source 2: SMHI Open Data

== Notable people ==
- Joel Eriksson (born 1998), racing driver
