= Tommarp River =

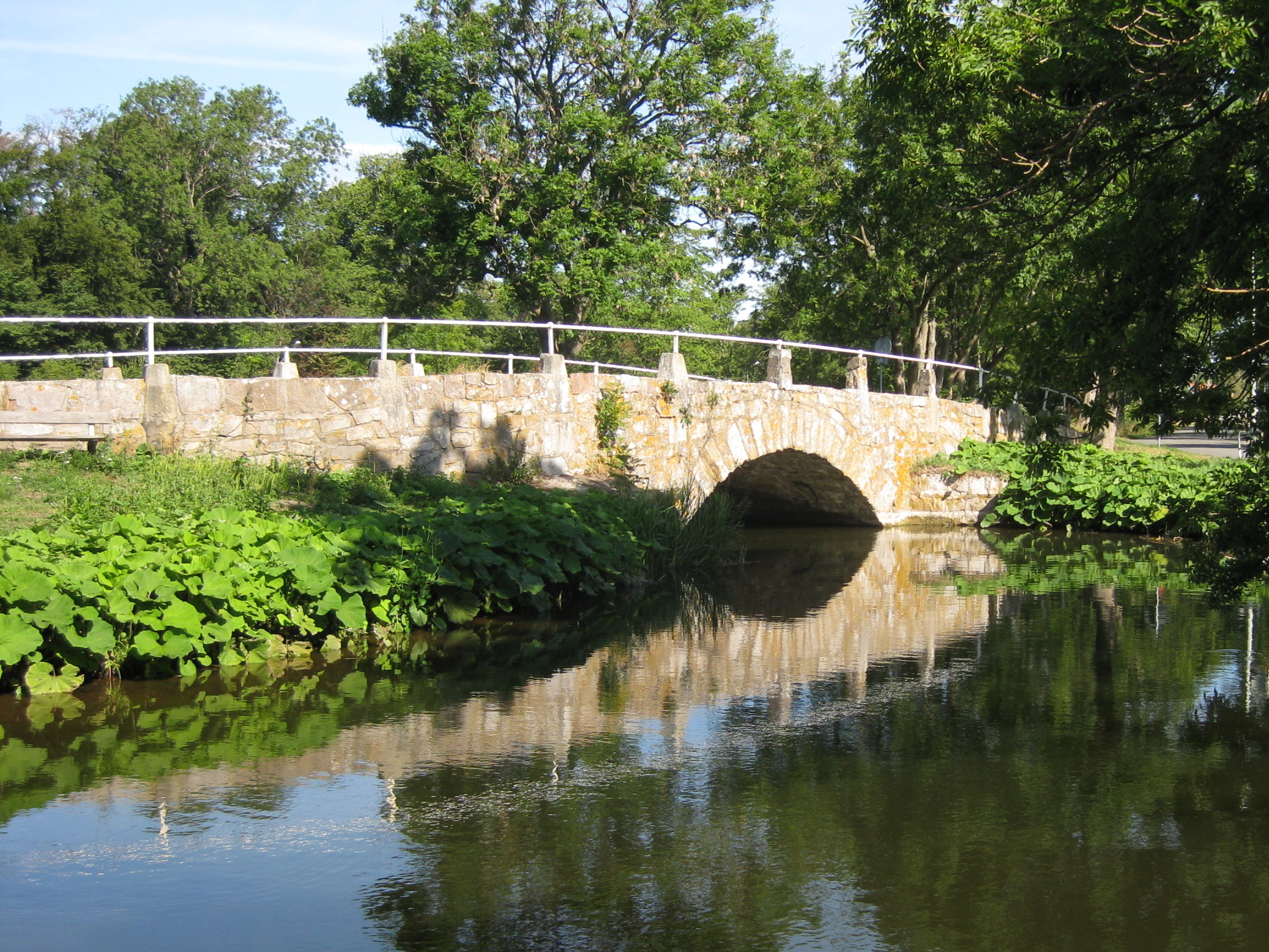
- The old bridge over Tommarpsån in Tobisvik north of Simrishamn.
- Native name: Tommarpsån (Swedish)

Location
- Country: Sweden
- County: Skåne
- Municipality: Simrishamn

Physical characteristics
- Mouth: Baltic Sea
  - location: Simrishamn
  - coordinates: 55°33′40″N 14°20′57″E
  - elevation: 0 m (0 ft)
- Length: 43 km (27 mi)

Tommarp River (Swedish: Tommarpsån) is a river in Skåne, Sweden.
