= List of Swedish architects =

This is a list of Swedish architects, including foreign-born architects who have worked in Sweden.

== A–M ==
- Johan Fredrik Åbom (1817–1900)
- Carl-Axel Acking (1910–2001)
- Carl Fredrik Adelcrantz (1716–1796)
- Uno Åhrén (1897–1977)
- Axel Johan Anderberg (1860–1937)
- Erik Asmussen (1913–1998)
- Gunnar Asplund (1885–1940)
- Fredrik Blom (1781–1853)
- Ferdinand Boberg (1860–1946)
- Étienne de Bonneuil (late 13th century), Uppsala Cathedral
- Carl Georg Brunius (1793–1869)
- Peter Celsing (1920–1974)
- William Chambers (1723–1796)
- Isak Gustaf Clason (1856–1930)
- Erik Dahlbergh (1625–1703)
- Gösta Danielsson (1912–1978)
- Louis Jean Desprez (1743–1804)
- Fritz Eckert (1852–1920)
- Adolf W. Edelsvärd (1824–1919)
- Rudolf S. Enblom (1861–1945)
- Ralph Erskine (1914–2005)
- Léonie Geisendorf (1914–2016)
- Carl Christoffer Gjörwell (1766–1837)
- Torben Grut (1871–1945)
- Axel Haig (1835–1921)
- Margit Hall (1901–1937), first woman in Sweden to graduate in architecture as an ordinary student
- Carl Hårleman (1700–1753)
- Martin Hedmark (1896–1980)
- Paul Hedqvist (1895–1977)
- Cyrillus Johansson (1884–1959)
- Hack Kampmann (1913–2005)
- Sigurd Lewerentz (1885–1975)
- Fredrik Lilljekvist (1863–1932)
- Bengt Lindroos (1918–2010)
- Jonas Lindvall (born 1963)
- Sture Ljungqvist (1921–2004)
- Sven Markelius (1889–1972)
- Bruno Mathsson (1907–1988)

== N–Z ==
- Carl Nyrén (1917–2011)
- Ragnar Östberg (1866–1945)
- Franciscus Pahr (died 1580), worked on the Uppsala Castle, the Uppsala Cathedral and Stockholm Palace
- Erik Palmstedt (1741–1803)
- Fredrik Magnus Piper (1746–1824)
- Hillevi Svedberg (1910–1990), collective housing
- Olof Tempelman (1745–1816)
- Ivar Tengbom (1878–1968)
- Nicodemus Tessin the Elder (1615–1681)
- Nicodemus Tessin the Younger (1654–1728)
- Jean de la Vallée (1620–1696)
- Simon de la Vallée (1590–1642)
- Justus Vingboons (1620–1698)
- Carl Westman (1866–1936)
- Hans Westman (1905–1991)
- Sidney White (1892–1949)
- Tage William-Olsson (1888–1960)
- Gert Wingårdh (born 1951)
- Folke Zettervall (1862–1955)
- Helgo Zetterwall (1831–1907)
- Ingrid Uddenberg (1913–1998)

== See also ==
- Architecture of Sweden
- List of architects
- List of Swedish people
