= Lindvall =

Lindvall is a surname. Notable people with the name include:

- Angela Lindvall (born 1979), American model and actress
- Audrey Lindvall (1982–2006), American model
- Christopher Lindvall (born 1996), Swedish politician
- Erik Lindvall (1895–1973), Swedish sprinter
- Gudrun Lindvall (born 1948), Swedish politician and schoolteacher
- Gustaf Lindvall (born 1991), Swedish professional ice hockey goaltender
- Jan Lindvall (born 1950), Norwegian cross-country skier
- Jonas Lindvall, Swedish architect and designer
- Paul Lindvall (born 1963), Swedish Moderate Party politician
- Per Lindvall, drummer with Swedish pop group ABBA
