= Uppland Runic Inscription 934 =

Coordinates: 59.8580°N 17.6349°E

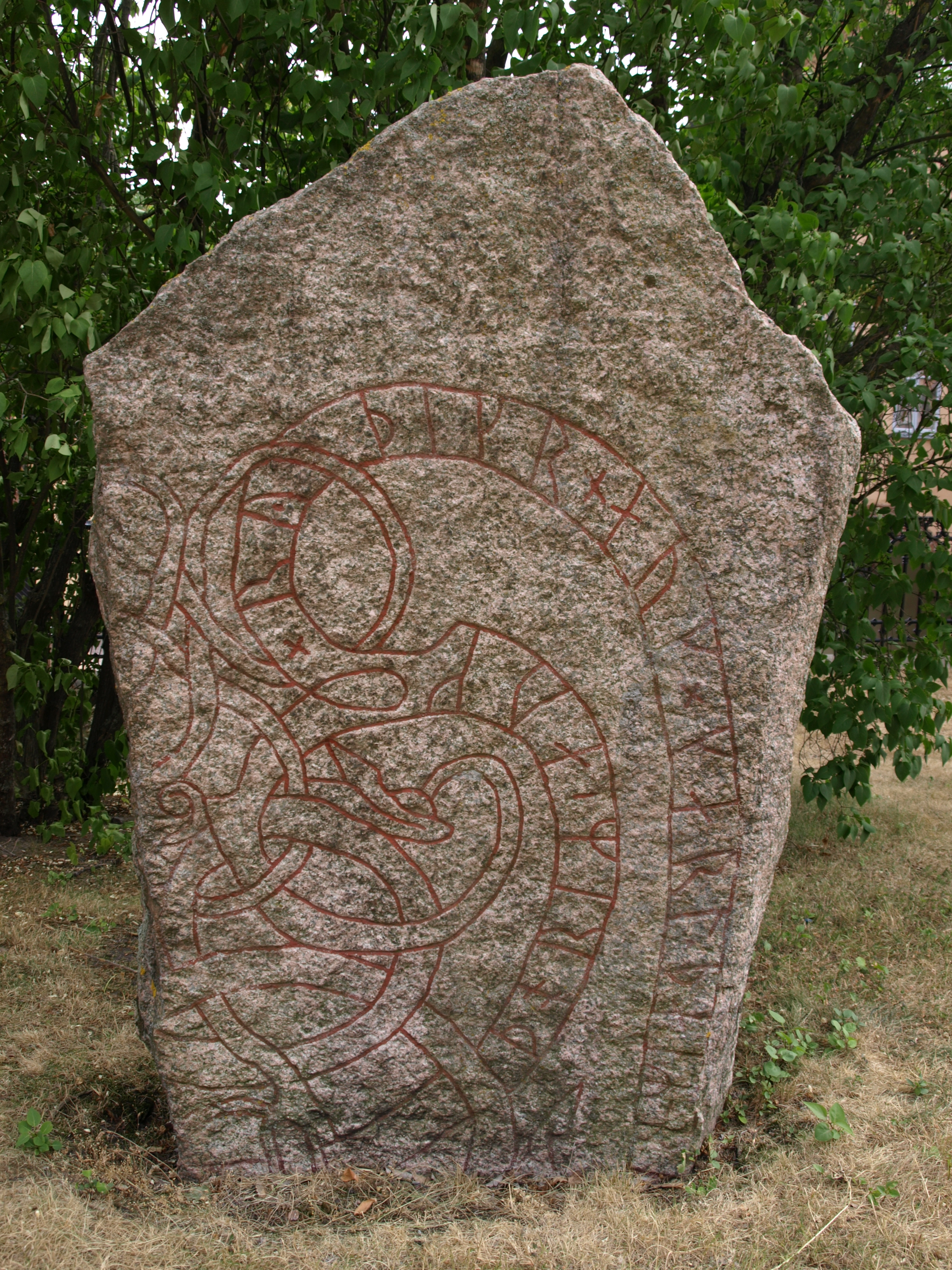
- Created: 11th Century
- Discovered: Uppsala Cathedral, Uppsala, Uppland, Sweden
- Rundata ID: U 934
- Runemaster: unknown

Text – Native
- Old Norse : Þoriʀ ok Hrøʀikʀ / Hrøðingʀ / Ryðingʀ ok Karl, þæiʀ br[øðr] ...

Translation
- Þórir and Hrœríkr / Hrœðingr / Ryðingr and Karl, these brothers ...

Runic inscription U 934 is the Rundata catalog listing for a Viking Age runestone located in Uppsala, Sweden.

== Description ==
This runestone was excavated from the foundation of Uppsala Cathedral in 1866. Many runestones were reused in the construction of buildings, roads, and bridges before their historical importance was understood. The runic text on this stone, which is 1.58 meters in height, is written upon a serpent that is intertwined with other beasts in the center of the design. The granite stone has sustained damage to sections of its runic text and design. The runestone has been classified as being carved in runestone style Pr4, also known as the Urnes style. This runestone style is characterized by slim and stylized animals that are interwoven into tight patterns. The animal heads are typically seen in profile with slender almond-shaped eyes and upwardly curled appendages on the noses and the necks.

== Inscription ==
A transliteration of the runic inscription is:

þoriʀ ' auk × ryþikr × auk × karl * þaiʀ + br... ...

== See also ==
- List of runestones
