= Pahr =

Pahr is a surname. Notable people with the surname include:

- Franciscus Pahr, Italian architect
- Willibald Pahr, Austrian politician
