= Güstrow Palace =

Castle in Güstrow, Germany

- Schloss Güstrow
- Güstrow, Mecklenburg-Western Pomerania, Germany
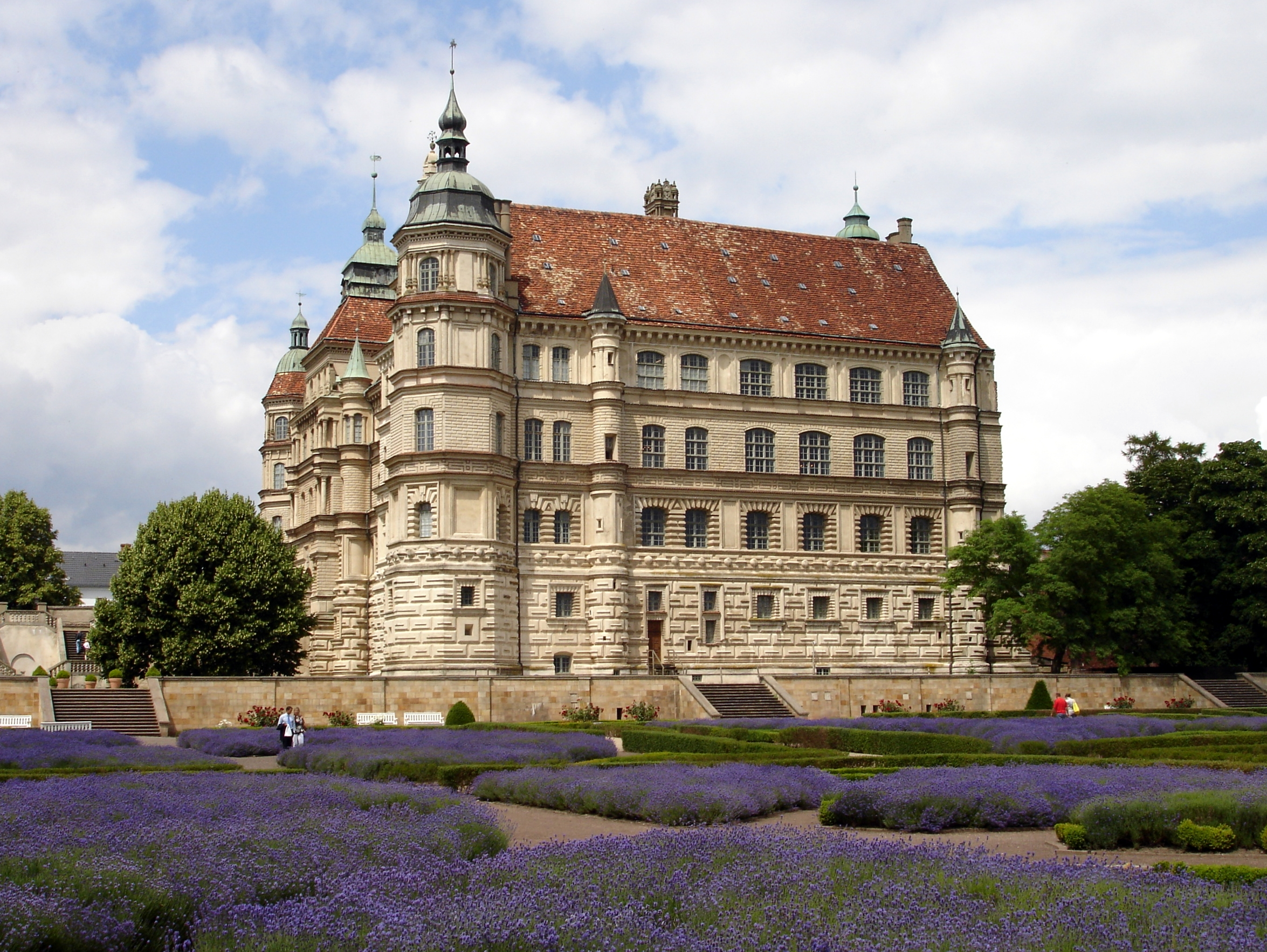

Location
- Shown within Mecklenburg-Vorpommern Güstrow Palace (Germany)
- Coordinates: 53°47′27″N 12°10′40″E

Site history
- Built: 1558

Güstrow Palace (German: Schloss Güstrow) is a Renaissance-era palatial schloss in Güstrow, Mecklenburg-Western Pomerania, Germany, used as a museum and cultural centre.

Built in 1558 for Ulrich, Duke of Mecklenburg, it is located close to the town wall of Güstrow's old town, and is quadrangular in shape. The 16th-century palace features stucco decorations and a Baroque-classicist gatehouse.

== History ==
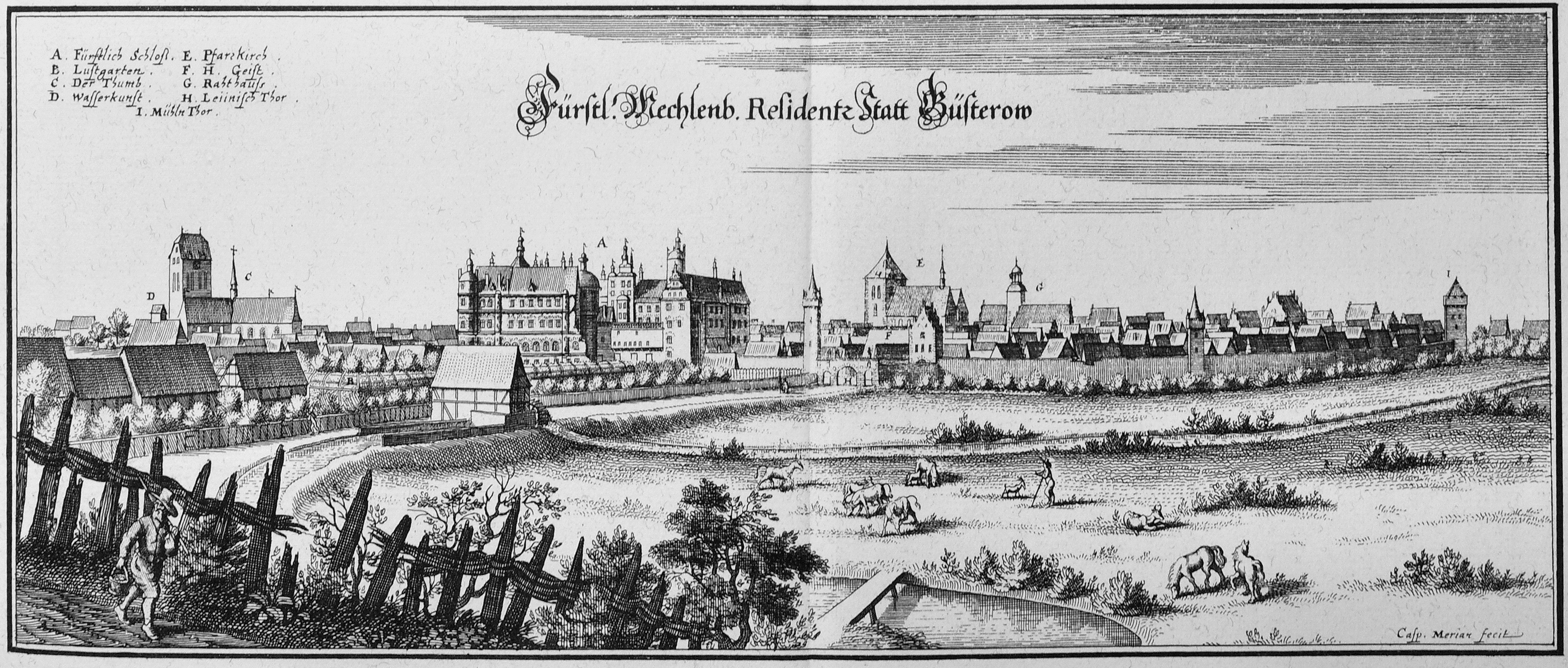
Güstrow Palace (before 1635)

Construction of the present palace in Renaissance style was initiated in 1558 by Ulrich, Duke of Mecklenburg, in place of a medieval castle. Italian architect Franciscus Pahr was the master builder who constructed the additional south and west wings in a fusion of Italian, French, and German architectural styles, unique for the time and area. Pahr was Prominent in introducing Renaissance architecture to Northern Europe.

In 1657, Gustav Adolf, the last Duke of Güstrow, engaged Charles Philippe Dieussart to refurbish parts of his palace in modern style. The Baroque gatehouse and the palace bridge were built during this time. After the end of ducal control, between 1817 and 1950, the palace became the farm house of Mecklenburg workers. Further restoration took place from 1963 to 1978, when the palace was restored to its original grandeur.

== Features ==
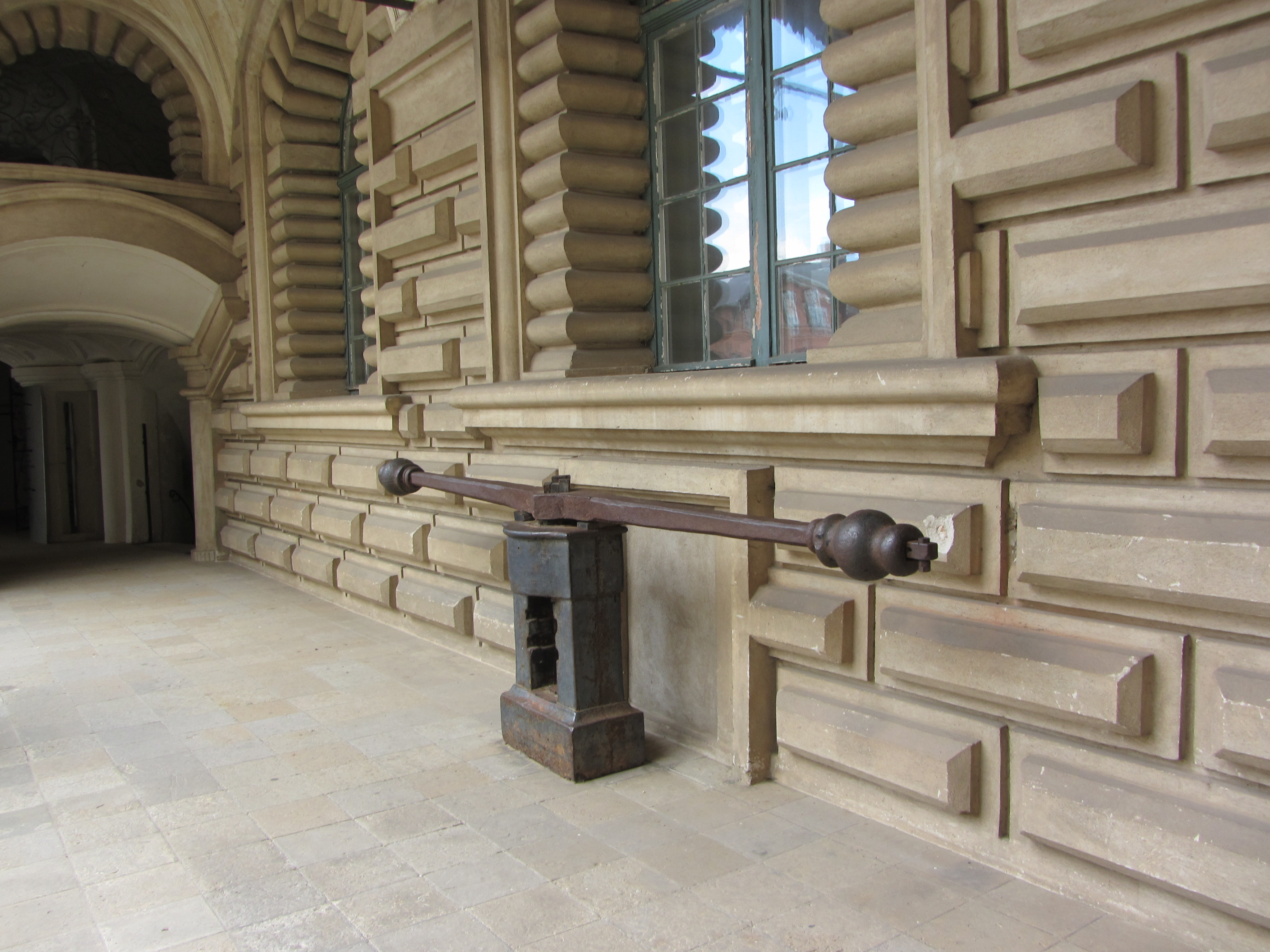
Interior view

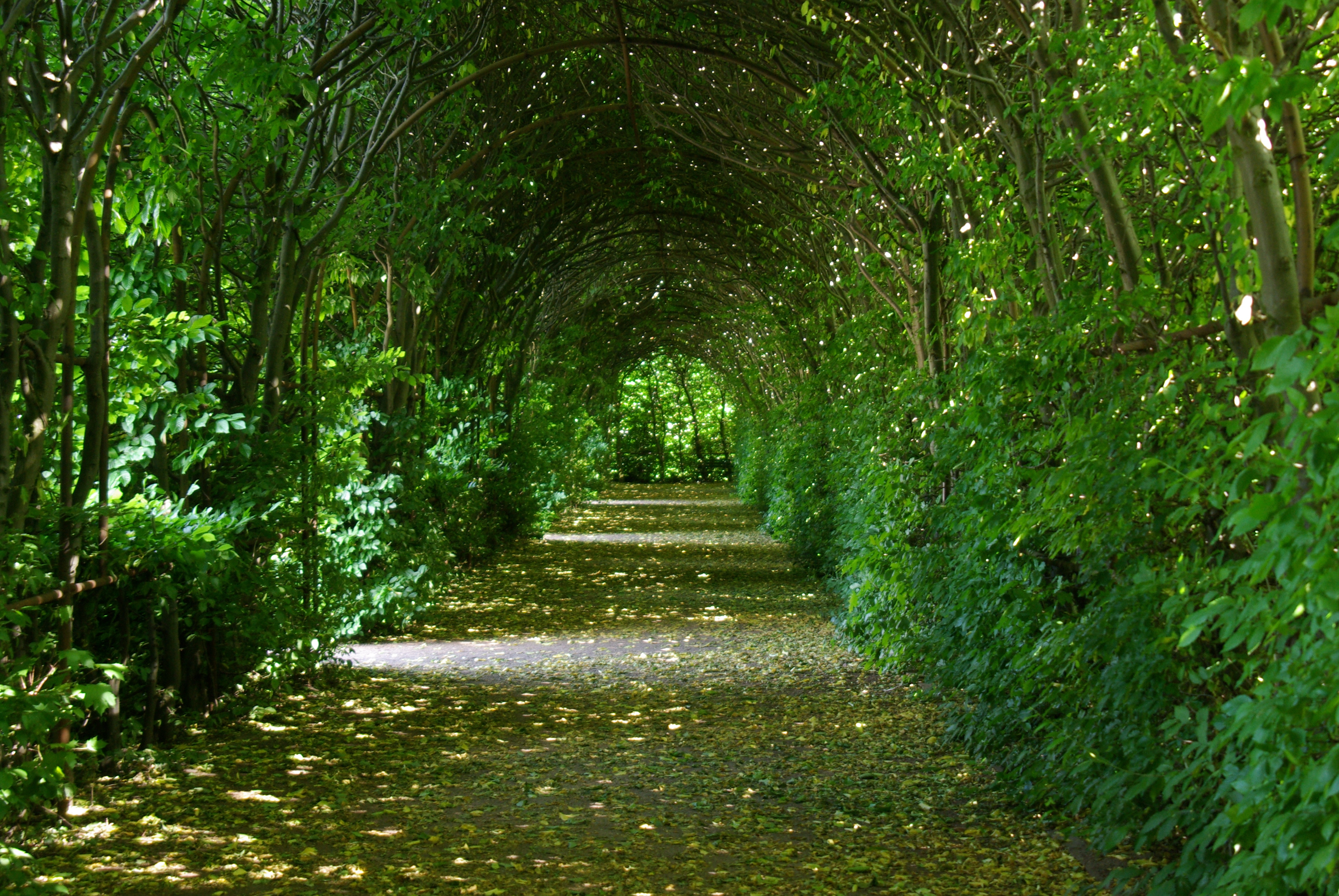
Pergola at the palatial gardens of Güstrow

Güstrow Palace is quadrangular in shape. Some of the old furniture has been removed to Schwerin and other places following the death of Magdalena Sybilla which marked the end of the Güstrow lineage. In one part of the palace, there are well preserved Flemish paintings; one particular painting is of a Dutchman smoking. A theatre is in good shape with well preserved original stucco paintings. The stucco ceilings are retained in their original form in the palace. The banquet hall's ceiling has unique stucco paintings of hunting scenes which are adaptations from Dutch copper engravings. The medieval rooms in the basement of the palace, which are vaulted, have many artifacts of the medieval period of Germany. The art chamber contains exhibits of hunting and ceremonial weapons. The refurbished former dining halls, residential and reception rooms have exhibits of paintings of Cranach, Marten de Vos, and Tintoretto. Antique ceramic vessels and a large number of glass items are on display in the former chamber of the duchess. There are also displays from the 19th to 21st centuries.

The grounds contain stables and a well-tended garden. The garden has been redone with beds of lavender and walkways.

== Museum ==
The palace houses a museum related to the male line of Duchess Elisabeth Sophie of Mecklenburg's family, presenting also art exhibitions and concerts.
