= Fredrik Lilljekvist =

Swedish architect

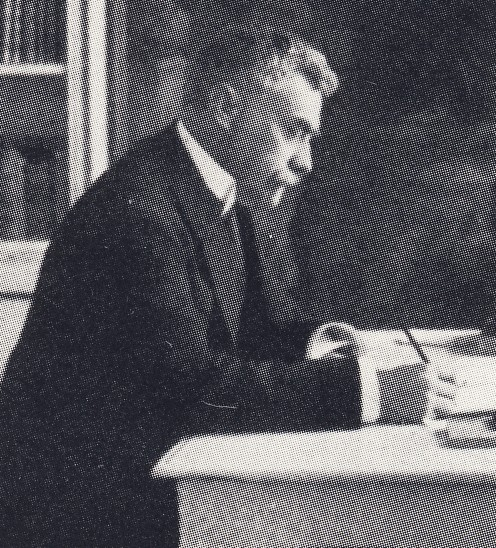
Fredrik Lilljekvist (1913)

Johan Fredrik Lilljekvist (Stockholm 8 October 1863 - Stockholm 18 December 1932) was a Swedish architect. He is best known for his controversial restoration of Gripsholm Castle and as the architect of the new building for the Royal Dramatic Theatre in Stockholm.

== Life in summary ==
Lilljekvist was born in Klara parish in Stockholm, son of a photographer. He studied architecture at the Royal Institute of Technology, where he graduated in 1884, and at the Royal Academy of Arts 1884–1887. He worked as an architect in Stockholm from 1888, and was appointed castle architect at Gripsholm in 1895. During the latter part of his life he was active as an urban planner; he was employed in the Överintendentämbetet, later the National Board of Public Building (Byggnadsstyrelsen, now Statens fastighetsverk), where he served as a byggnadsråd (building councillor) and department head from 1918 until 1930.

== The restoration of Gripsholm ==
During his time at the academy, Lilljekvist worked with the art historian Gustaf Upmark in documenting Gripsholm Castle. On his own initiative, he made a restoration plan for the Castle that was shown at the spring exhibition of the academy in 1888. He continued to work on the plans the following years and when he was appointed head of the restoration work at Gripsholm, these plans were used in a modified form. His plans were influenced by the restoration ideology of Viollet-le-Duc, according to which a building should be restored to its original style and to the state in which its originators would have wanted to see it. The main representative of this school in Sweden was Helgo Zettervall. In this case the ideal was the Renaissance architecture of the early Vasa period (1523–1611). An opposing ideology that would eventually come to dominance in Sweden in the early 20th century was to restore buildings in a way that showed respect for its entire history. Lilljekvist's work was severely criticized in an article in the newspaper Dagens Nyheter by the writer Verner von Heidenstam, who suggested that a sign should be put at the Castle saying in mock-archaic Swedish, that "An̄o Domini 1893 gjordes detta gambla hus ændnu gamblare" ("An̄o Domini 1893 this old House was made even older"). Lilljekvist later worked on the less radical restoration of Strängnäs Cathedral together with Sigurd Curman, a representative of the new ideals.

== New buildings in the 1890s ==
Many of his new buildings during the 1890s and the years around the turn of the century were designed in a style influenced by renaissance or baroque architecture. He was one of the architects of the new affluent suburb of Djursholm, where he built a chapel and several private villas, including one for himself. For the General Art and Industrial Exposition of Stockholm (1897), Lilljekvist collaborated with Ferdinand Boberg in the construction of the large "industry hall" with its cupola. The cupola was probably influenced by the one built by Martin Nyrop over the main hall of the Copenhagen Exhibition of 1888, but Boberg and Lilljekvist added four high minaret-like towers connected to the cupola by bridges.

== The Royal Dramatic Theatre ==
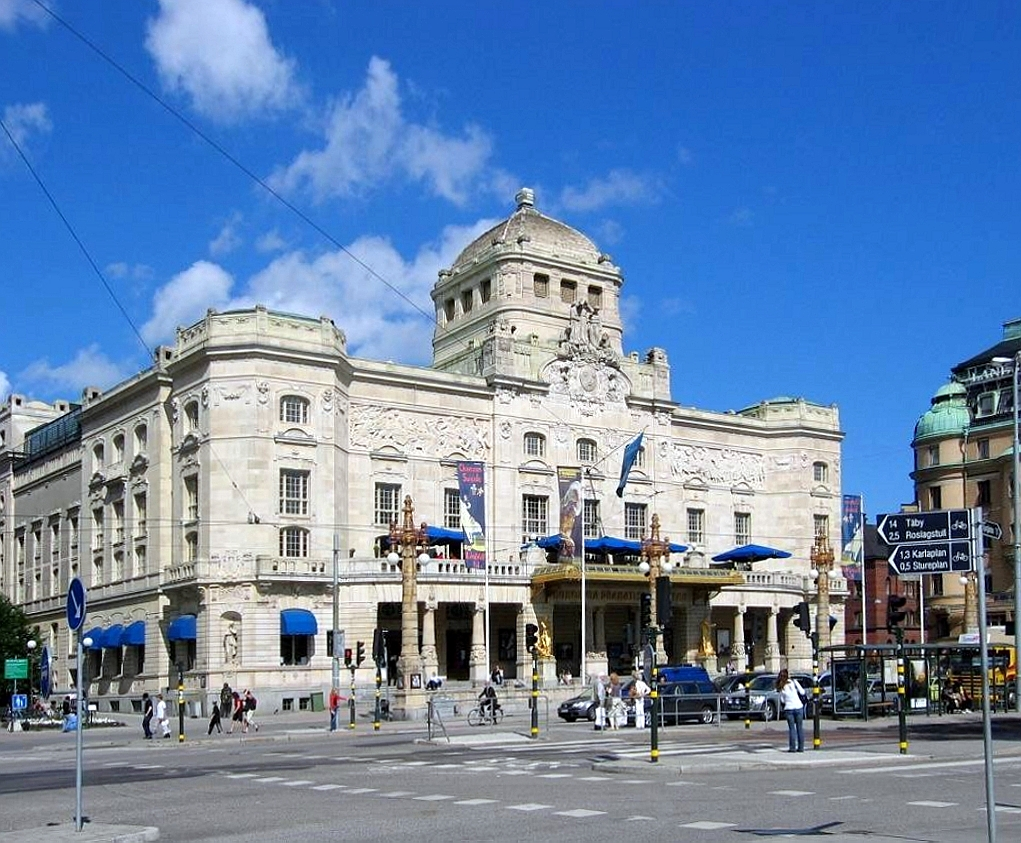
The Royal Dramatic Theatre

He became involved in the project for the Royal Dramatic Theatre in 1901. He started with a classical design, which eventually developed a more Baroque character. In the end, he produced a design that took some of the volumes from Neo-Baroque architecture but with ornamental and sculptural forms borrowed from Swedish nature but influenced by continental Art Nouveau, which, by the time the building was completed in 1908, had already started to go out of fashion.

The architect Carl Westman, whose ideal was more austere, criticized the building for its flamboyant decoration. In Westman's view the decoration of the building should be like the ornaments of a knight's armour rather than like the bands and flowers of his lady's dress. Lilljekvist replied that a dramatic theatre need not look grim, like a knight in armour. Thalia, as a woman, could be allowed her bands and flowers. Rather than dressing her in sackcloth and ashes, she "may meet us friendly and smiling, as long as the smile is chaste and the dress is white".

Additional criticism was directed at the theatre building and its architect because of its huge and uncalculated expenses. Lilljekvist was not given any similarly large projects again. In the following years, he worked on several projects for Swedish embassy buildings abroad, and the last decade-and-a-half of his life was entirely dedicated to urban planning. From 1918 until 1930, he served as head of the urban planning bureau of the National Board of Public Building.

== Bibliography ==
- Andersson, Henrik O. & Fredric Bedoire, "Lilljekvist, Johan Fredrik", Svenskt biografiskt lexikon, 23 (1980), pp. 158–161.
- Linn, Björn: "Arkitekturen", Signums svenska konsthistoria. Konsten 1890-1915, Lund: Signum, 2001, pp. 27–155.
