= Rudolf S. Enblom =

Swedish architect (1861–1945)

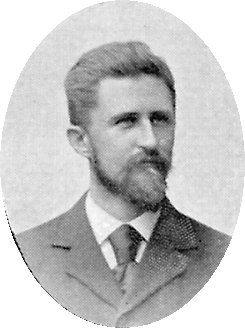
- Born: 25 August 1861; Ekerö, Sweden
- Died: 27 February 1945 (aged 83); Stockholm, Sweden

Rudolf S. Enblom (25 August 1861 – 27 February 1945) was a Swedish architect.

== Biography ==
Rudolf Samuel Enblom was born in Hilleshög in Ekerö Municipality, Sweden. He studied at the Copenhagen Technical College and the Royal Danish Academy of Fine Arts in Copenhagen 1882–84. He was a student at the KTH Royal Institute of Technology in Stockholm from 1884 to 1886. He was a senior teacher in construction engineering at the Royal Institute of Technology in 1899–1932 and director of its construction school in 1925–32.

His designed included an apartment building at Upplandsgatan in 1891, Kristallsalongen, an open-air theater at Djurgården in Stockholm in 1892 and Veterinary University buildings (now part of Swedish University of Agricultural Sciences) in 1906–09.
