= Ingrid Uddenberg =

Swedish architect (1913 – 1998)

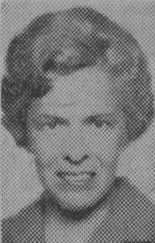
Ingrid Uddenberg

Ingrid Albertina Uddenberg (12 July 1913 – 27 October 1998) was a Swedish architect who mostly designed hospitals and schools. She also designed the Skärholmen's church along with Swedish interior architect Tore Darelius.

== Biography ==
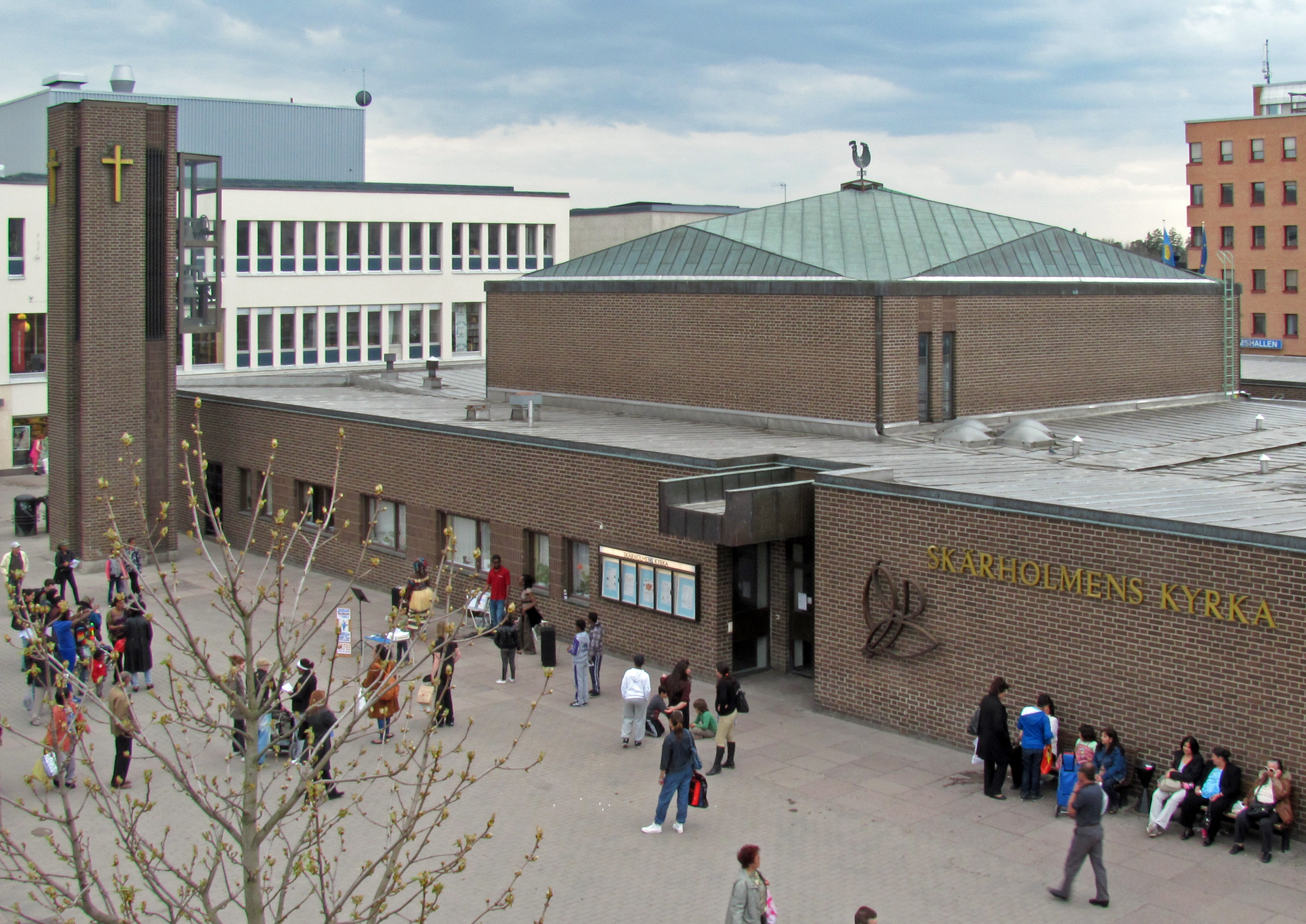
Skärholmen Church

Ingrid Albertina Uddenberg was born on 12 July 1913 in Matteus parish, Stockholm, Sweden. After matriculating in 1932 at Åhlinska School, a girls' school in Stockholm, Uddenberg went on to study at the KTH Royal Institute of Technology between 1933 and 1938. Later she was employed by architect Albin Stark at the building board in Stockholm and the county architect's office in Kalmar. Between 1938 and 1944, she worked at the architectural office of Sven Ahlbom in Västerås. She also had a long career with architect Gustaf Birch-Lindgren from 1944 to 1955. In 1955, Uddenberg started her own business in collaboration with Bendt Hjelm-Jensen.

She mainly designed health and educational institutions which include the Thorax clinic; the alcohol clinic; the Magnus Huss clinic at Karolinska; hospital in Solna; the child psychiatric clinic in Lund; Nynäshamn hospital; and Mariebergsskolan in Örebro. She was the secretary of association of women technologists from 1936 to 1937. She was also associated with the national nssociation of Swedish architects.

She was married to the architect Hans Uddenberg.

She died on 27 October 1998 in Lidingö, Stockholm county.
