= Christopher Lindvall =

Swedish politician (born 1996)

Member of the Riksdag
- In office 26 September 2022 – 18 October 2022
- Succeeded by: Magdalena Andersson
- Constituency: Stockholm County

Personal details
- Born: 20 June 1996 (age 29)
- Party: Social Democratic Party

Christopher Niklas Lindvall (born 20 June 1996) is a Swedish politician of the Social Democratic Party. In 2022, he was a member of the Riksdag. He took office on 26 September, as the substitute of prime minister Magdalena Andersson, and left office on 18 October, following the dissolution of the Andersson cabinet and her return to the Riksdag. He is a member of the municipal council of Järfälla.
