= Sture Ljungqvist =

Swedish architect

Sture Ljungqvist (June 29, 1921 – April 28, 2004) was a Swedish architect.

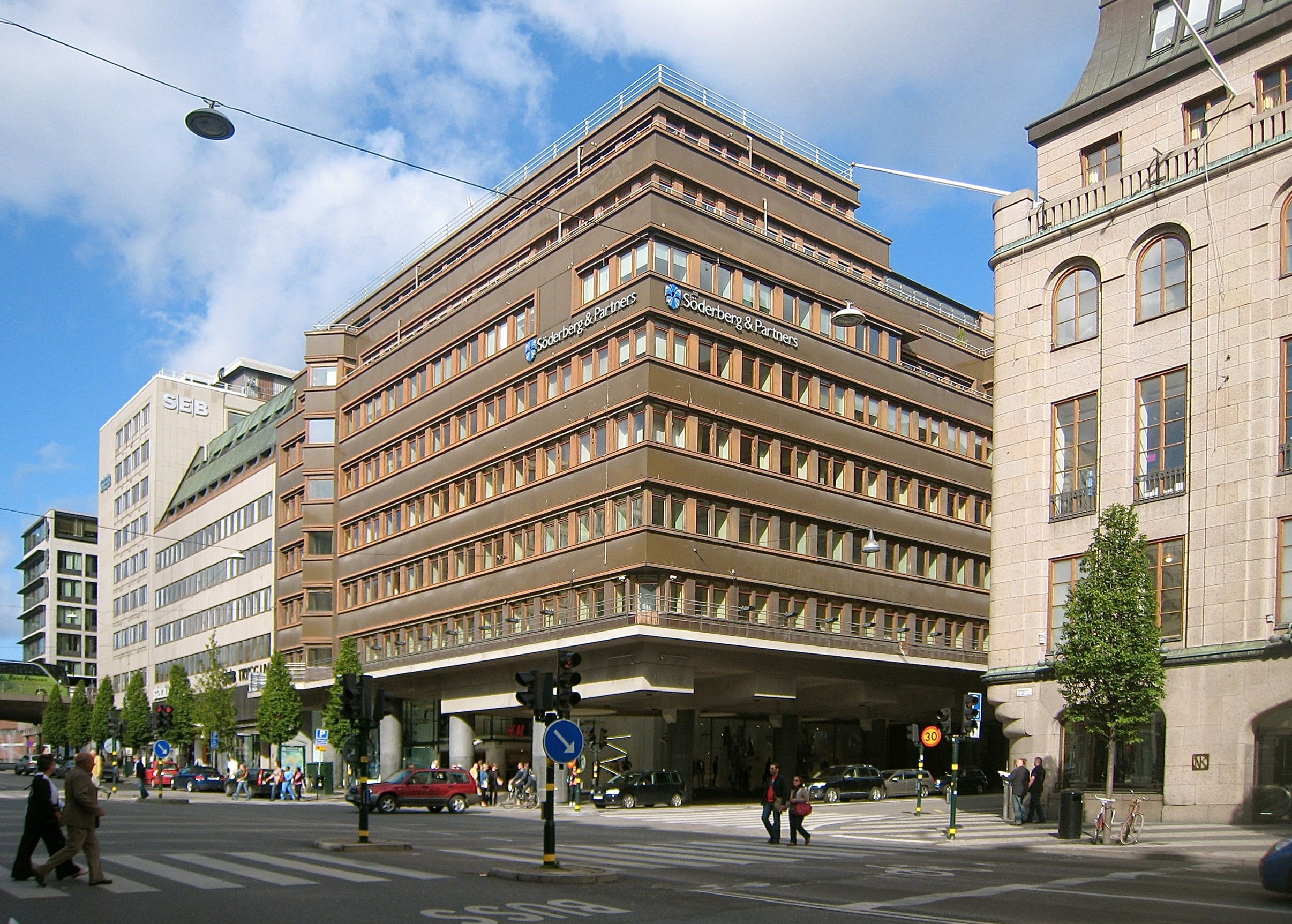
Hästskopalatset

== Biography ==
Ljungqvist was born in Stockholm, Sweden. He graduated from the KTH Royal Institute of Technology in 1946 and from the Royal Swedish Academy of Fine Arts in 1950. He founded the architectural firm Höjer-Ljungqvist Arkitektkontor in 1952 together with Jon Höjer (1922- 2014). In 1992, Höjer and Ljungqvist donated their architectural form to the employees who changed its name to Origo Architects.

His architecture is characterised by complete complexes or whole city blocks with associated equipment such as malls, schools and libraries. Among his work was the re-design of Hästskopalatset, a combined commercial and office property in the Hästskon district in central Stockholm which underwent extensive rebuilding between 1971 and 1972.
