= Étienne de Bonneuil =

French architect

Étienne de Bonneuil, also Estienne de Bonnueill, was a French master builder or architect in the second half of the 13th century. He is remembered for participating in the design and construction of Uppsala Cathedral.

== Biography ==
Bonneuil's name is recorded in various documents relating to his intention to go to Uppsala, Sweden, to design the new cathedral. It was however only in 1287 that Philippe le Bel authorized his departure together with the colleagues and yeomen (bachelers) he planned to take with him to cut and carve the stone. Work on the cathedral was in fact already well on its way when he arrived, no doubt because Archbishop Laurentius of the Franciscans had already planned the building in 1258. He appears to have arrived in Uppsala in 1288 where he continued building the chapels around the chancel in a clockwise direction and completed the south arm of the transept around 1300 and the north arm a few years later. He is credited with designing the cathedral's ambulatory and its chapels at the east end of the cathedral. Bonneuil appears to have implemented the plans of his unknown predecessor as no changes can be seen in the pillars and window frames following his arrival although he does appear to have altered the height of the chancel vaults and may also have redesigned the south portal. It is probable that later work on the cathedral was carried out under one of his students.

It seems probable that the man with a knee-length skirt sculpted on one of the capitals in the eastern part of ambulatory in Uppsala Cathedral is in fact a likeness of Bonneuil who worked on the vaulting there. He is also no doubt the stonemason referred to as "Stefan stenhuggare" in a 1291 document.

== Bibliography ==
- Lovén, Christian (2009). "La neige, les briques et l'architecte français. La cathédrale d'Uppsala 1272—". Regards Sur la France du Moyen Âge. Mélanges Offerts À Gunnel Engwall (Sällskapet Runica et Mediævalia). Stockholm 2009 (in French). Stockholm: Sällskapet Runica et Mediævalia.
