= Uppsala Cathedral =

Uppsala Domkyrka
- The Metropolitan Cathedral Church of Uppsala
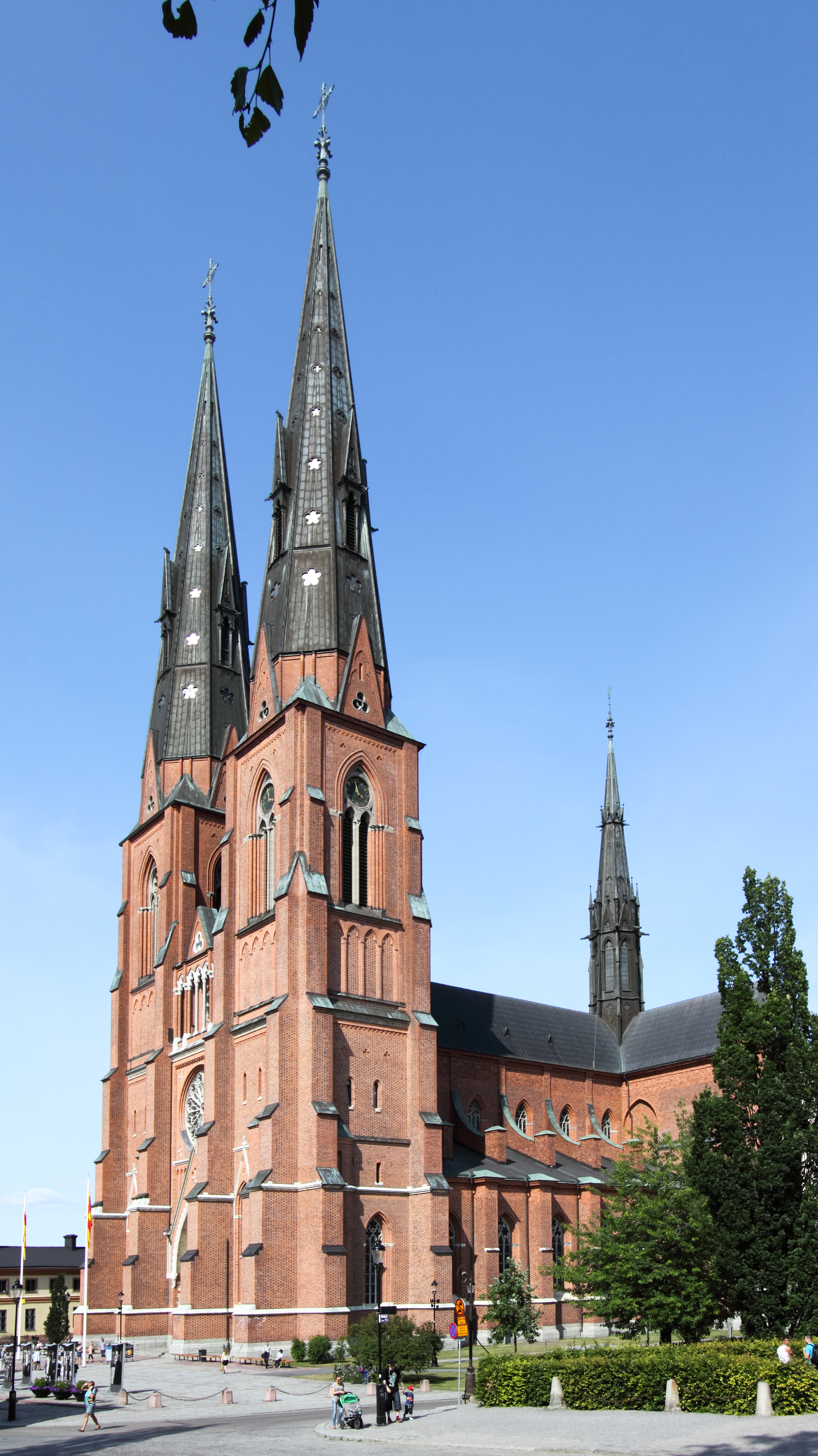
- Uppsala Cathedral from the southwest
- Uppsala Domkyrka
- 59°51′29″N 17°38′00″E
- Location: Uppsala, Uppland
- Country: Sweden
- Denomination: Church of Sweden
- Previous denomination: Roman Catholic
- Website: Uppsala Cathedral

History
- Status: Cathedral, National shrine
- Dedication: Saint Lawrence, Saint Eric, Saint Olaf
- Consecrated: 7 June 1435

Architecture
- Functional status: Active
- Style: Gothic
- Years built: 1272–1893 (last major alteration)

Specifications
- Length: 389 feet (119 m)
- Width: 148 feet (45 m)

Administration
- Archdiocese: Uppsala

Clergy
- Archbishop: Martin Modéus
- Bishop: Karin Johannesson

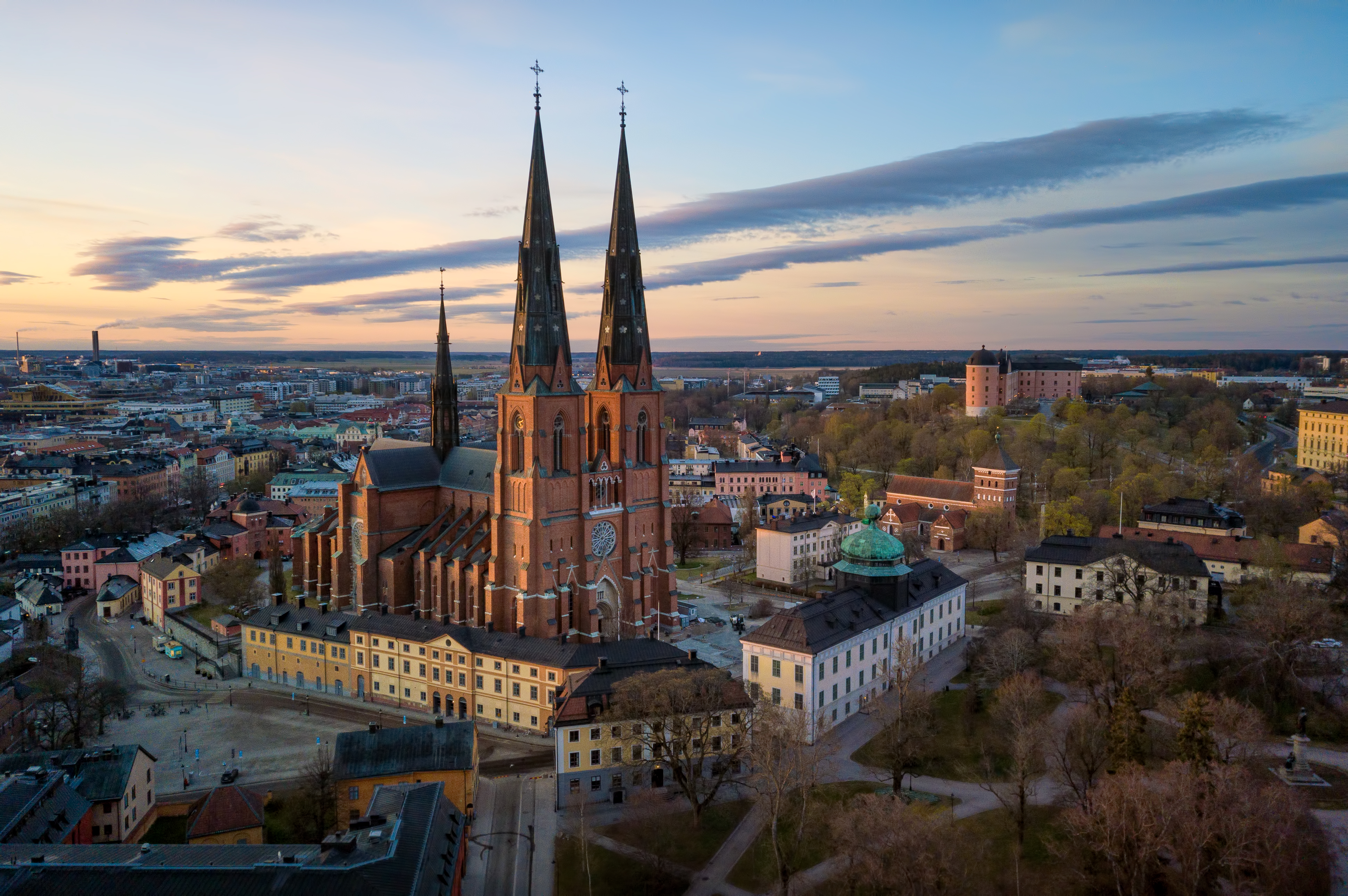
Aerial view of the cathedral and Uppsala skyline

Uppsala Cathedral (Swedish: Uppsala domkyrka) is a cathedral located between the University Hall of Uppsala University and the Fyris river in the centre of Uppsala, Sweden. A church of the Church of Sweden, the national church, in the Evangelical-Lutheran tradition, Uppsala Cathedral is the seat of the Archbishop of Uppsala, the primate of Sweden. It is also the burial site of King Eric IX (c. 1120–1160, reigned 1156–1160), who became the patron saint of the nation, and it was the traditional location for the coronation of new Kings of Sweden. The current archbishop is Martin Modéus and the current bishop is Karin Johannesson.

The cathedral dates to the late 13th century and, at a height of 118.7 metres (389 ft), it is the tallest church in the Nordic countries. Originally built under Roman Catholicism, it was used for coronations of Swedish monarchs for a lengthy period following the Protestant Reformation. Several of its chapels were converted to house the tombs of Swedish monarchs, including Gustav Vasa and John III. Carl Linnaeus, Olaus Rudbeck, Emanuel Swedenborg, and several archbishops are also buried here.

The church was designed in the French Gothic style by French architects including Étienne de Bonneuil. It is in the form of a cross formed by the nave and transept. Most of the structure was built between 1272 and 1420 but the western end was completed only in the middle of the 15th century. Twin towers were built shortly afterwards on the west end of the church. High spires were added later, but after a fire in 1702, they were adorned with low helms by Carl Hårleman in 1735. They were completely redesigned by Helgo Zetterwall who undertook substantial changes to the building in the 1880s. The cathedral's principal construction material is brick but the pillars and many details are of Gotland limestone.

The vaults were all built according to the original 13th-century plan although some of them were erected as late as around 1440. In addition to the artwork in the funeral chapels, several of the church's older furnishings can be seen in the Treasury Museum. In 1702, many features were destroyed in a major fire. During the renovation work carried out in the 1970s, many of the medieval frescoes which had been whitewashed over after the Reformation were uncovered and restored.

== History ==
At the end of the Viking Age, the pagan temple at Gamla Uppsala (Old Uppsala), about 5 kilometres (3.1 mi) to the north of today's Uppsala, was replaced by a Christian church. Although the exact date of its construction is not known, in 1123 Siward was ordained Bishop of Uppsala by the Archbishop of Bremen-Hamburg. It is however uncertain if Siward ever assumed office, as he had been expelled and was in Germany in the early 1130s. The catalogue of bishops mentions Severeinus as the first bishop, and he may have been the replacement for Siward. Henrik, 'Finland's Apostle', was the fourth bishop. In 1164, Sweden became an archbishopric under the control of Lund. The first archbishop was the Cistercian monk Stefan of Alvastra.

After the cathedral in Gamla Uppsala was damaged by fire in 1204, the Chapter sought permission from the Holy See to move the building to a larger site. Pope Alexander IV granted this request in 1258 on condition that the name of Uppsala be maintained. At a meeting in Söderköping in September 1270, Archbishop Fulco Angelus and the cathedral chapter decided the site should be in Östra Aros. Formal authorization of the move was issued in 1271 by Bishop Carolus of Västerås whom the Pope had appointed to oversee the case.

Uppsala Cathedral and the Fyris River

About 1272, work began on building a new cathedral in Östra Aros near the Fyris River to the south. It was likely constructed on the site of an earlier church dedicated to the Holy Trinity, the remains of which were discovered in 2005. It was here that Sweden's patron saint Eric Jedvardsson had attended mass before he was murdered in 1160. The name of Uppsala was kept, and the surrounding town Östra Aros soon changed its name accordingly. The relics of Saint Eric, the treasure of Uppsala, were moved from Gamla Uppsala to the new site in 1273, along with the formal move of the archbishopric. The church was designed by French architects although the name of the author of the detailed initial plans who supervised work until 1281 has not been recorded. In 1287, a promissory note drawn up by the provost of Paris covers the expenses to be incurred by master builder Étienne de Bonneuil and his assistants in travelling to Sweden to work on the construction of a cathedral at Uppsala. Étienne is credited with work at the east and south chapels of the chancel, the transepts and probably the south portal, although in most of his work he appears to have meticulously followed the plans of his predecessor. Progress was slow as a result of the cold climate, the plague and many financial difficulties. It was not until the end of the 14th century that work on the initial plans was completed, thanks in particular to the contribution of the master builder Nikolaus från Västerås who began construction of the nave.

When consecrated in 1435 by Archbishop Olaus Laurentii, the cathedral still was not complete. It was dedicated to Saint Lawrence, highly cherished in all of Sweden at that time; Saint Eric, the patron saint of Sweden; and Saint Olaf, the patron saint of Norway. It was completed over the following decades. Although there are no documentary records of the consecration, there are several references from the same period to the cathedral's chapels, including their altars which were dedicated to the Holy Cross, to the Virgin Mary or to other saints. The last main component of the cathedral, the towers, were built between 1470 and 1489. The cathedral was damaged by fire on several occasions, especially during the great fire of 1702 which destroyed much of the city. Restoration work was not completed until the middle of the century.

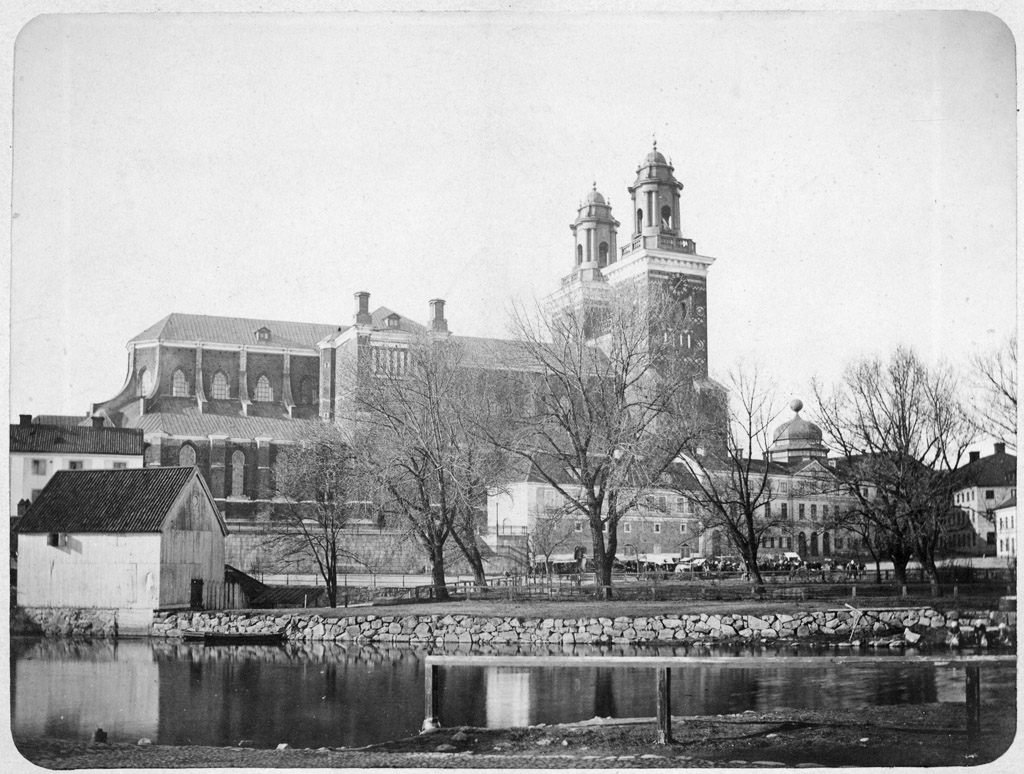
A photograph of Uppsala Cathedral by Emma Schenson in around 1860, before Zettervall's renovation

The church was not the regular place of worship of laypeople until the Reformation. It was reserved for official services of the Catholic Church hierarchy (by the cathedral's canons). The parish churches in Uppsala were the Holy Trinity Church or Bondkyrkan, 'Peasant Church', as it was often called; Church of Saint Peter; Church of Our Lady; and a Franciscan friary. The last three had been built on the east side of the Fyris River, which was the central business district, and remains so to date. They were successively torn down during the Reformation. The cathedral was also the coronation church for many of Sweden's kings and queens until 1719. It was the site of celebrating coronations from the Middle Ages until the end of the 17th century. Stockholm's Cathedral Storkyrkan became the official coronation church.

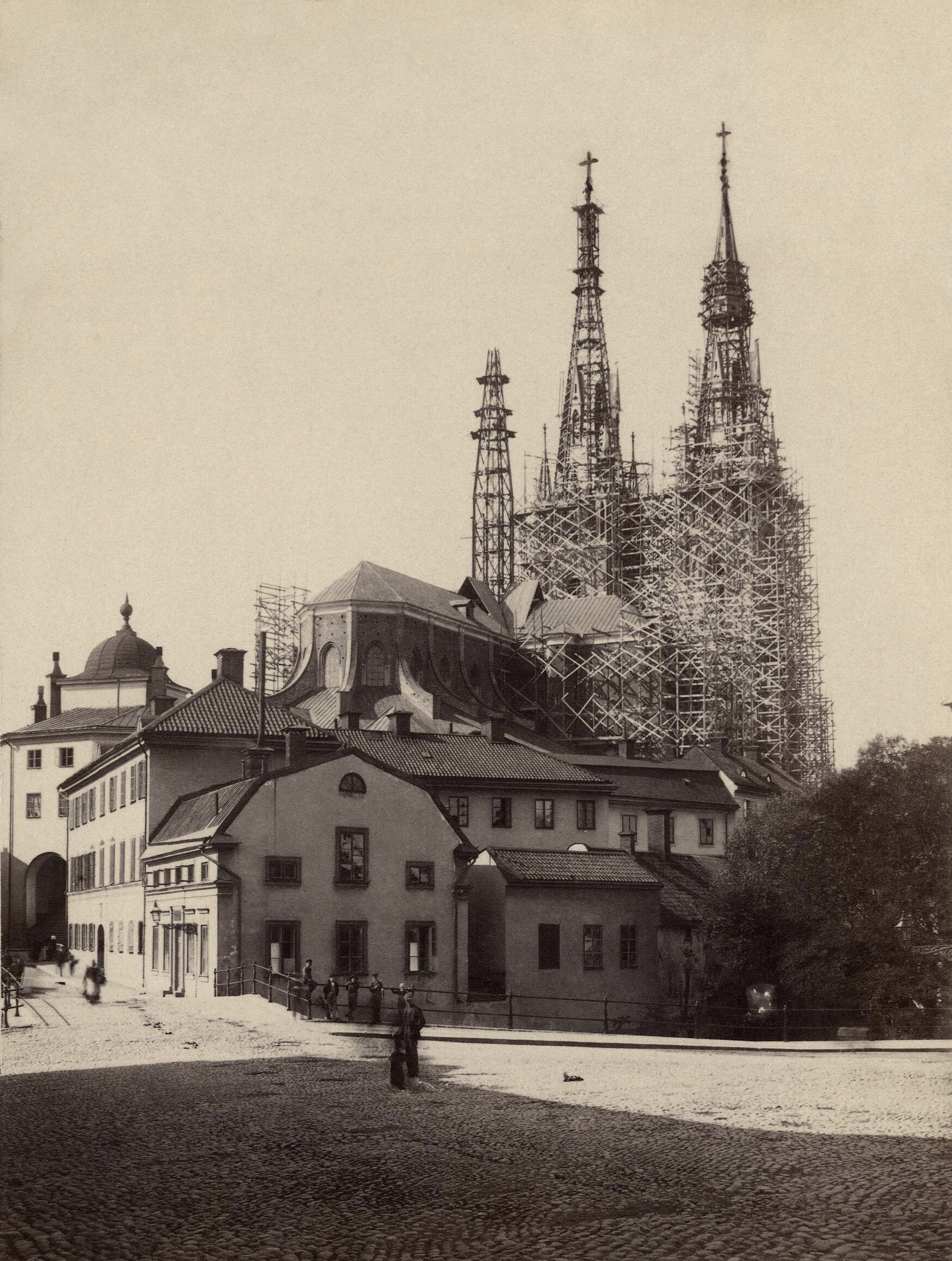
Uppsala Cathedral during the renovation and changes by Helgo Zettervall

From 1885 to 1893, the architect Helgo Zettervall (1831–1907) undertook comprehensive restoration work, seeking to give the cathedral a French High Gothic appearance although he has been criticized for not respecting the building's original Baltic Gothic style. He also added pointed French spires to the towers, bringing the cathedral up to a height of 118.7 m (389 ft), so making it as high as it was long. In an attempt to give the cathedral a slimmer appearance, Zettervall significantly altered large portions of the medieval outer brick walls and removed the decorative white-washed 'blind windows' on the gables which had been similar to those on the nearby Holy Trinity Church.

Further renovation work in the early 1970s led to improvements in the building's structure and included restoration of the walls and windows. Large portions of cement additions by Zettervall to the exterior structure of the cathedral were removed decades later as they adversely affected the building's fabric. In 1989, Pope John Paul II took part in an ecumenical service in Uppsala Cathedral with Archbishop Bertil Werkström. Fire protection equipment was installed in 2010 and the electrical and heating systems have been replaced.

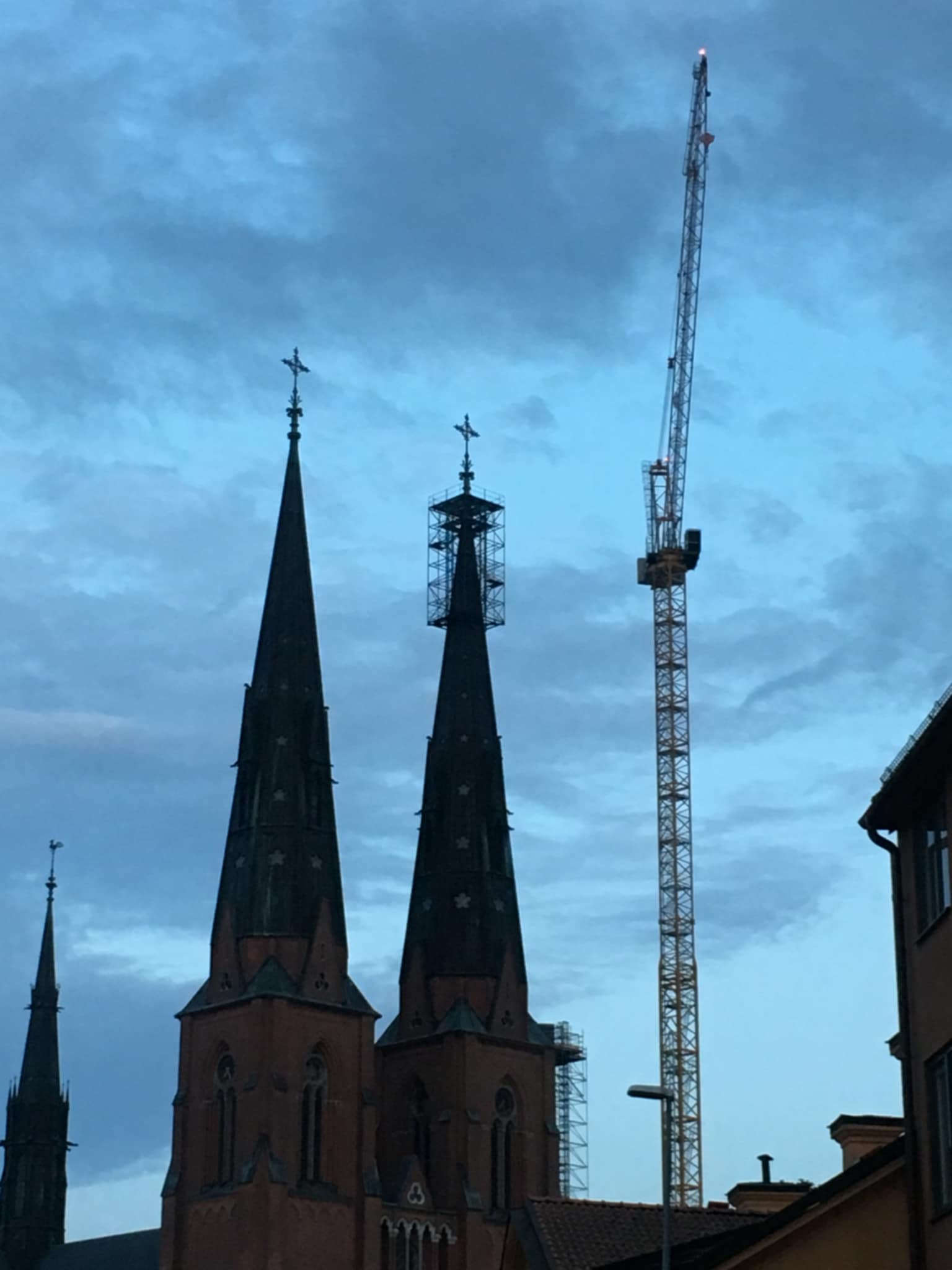
Beginning of the restoration works on the spires (2019)

Between 2019 and 2021, the Uppsala Cathedral underwent a major restoration of its twin spire crowns and crosses. The structures - measuring 10 meters high, 3.5 meters wide, and weighing 4.2 tons - were originally installed in 1889 and made of cast iron, showed significant signs of corrosion and cracking, prompting concerns about their structural integrity. Following an inspection in 2015, a restoration project was initiated to ensure the safety and longevity of these prominent architectural features.

The restoration involved removing the original elements, performing detailed structural analyses, and casting new components using modern ductile iron to replicate the originals while improving durability. The work was carried out by Swedish research institutes and foundries, with new parts designed to maintain the historical appearance while enhancing resistance to moisture and rust. The reinstallation of the spires began in May 2021, and the original crosses were returned to their positions later that summer. The project was completed in autumn 2021.

== Architecture ==
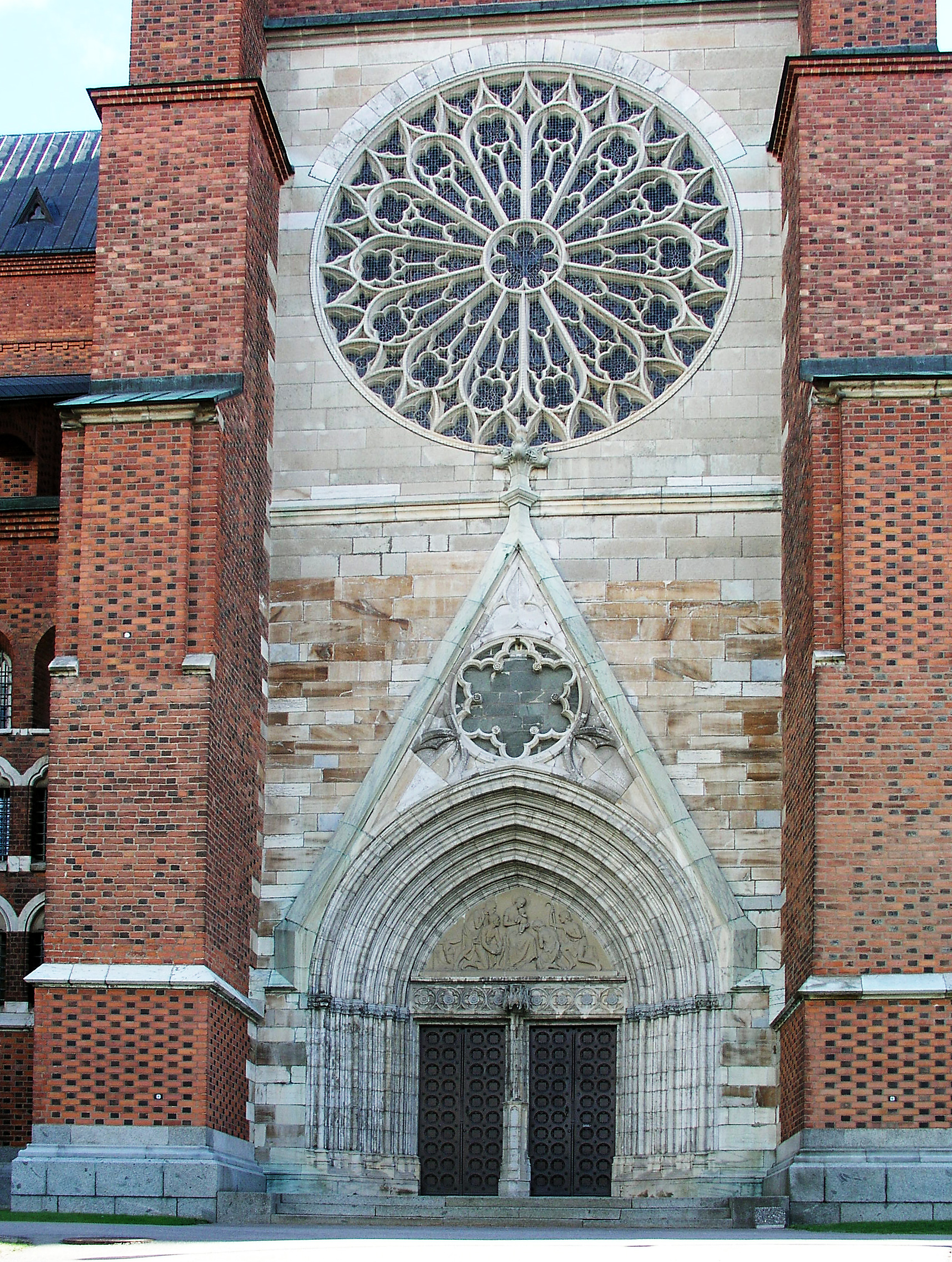
North transept portal with rose window

The façade

Exterior of the choir

The cathedral is the tallest church building in Scandinavia. Its height of 118.7 m (389 ft) is the same as its length while it has a breadth of 45 m (148 ft). The height inside is 27 metres (89 ft). The church was designed in the French High Gothic style by French master builders including Étienne de Bonneuil. Built high on a gravel ridge southwest of the River Fyris, its Latin cross ground plan consists of a three-aisled basilica (a central nave flanked by two lateral aisles) with single-aisle transepts, and a four-bay chancel with an ambulatory surrounded by five chapels. The seven-bay nave is bordered by chantry chapels on either side. Starting with the eastern end of the church and the chapels surrounding the chancel, most of the structure was built between 1270 and 1420 but the western end of the nave was completed only in the middle of the 15th century while the towers took decades more to complete. The principal material is red brick but the cathedral was built on a stone foundation and the chancel pillars and many details are of Gotland limestone. (The nave pillars were originally of brick but were replaced with limestone as part of the restoration work carried out under Helgo Zettervall from 1885 to 1893.)

The twin towers at the west end of the church were first mentioned in 1563. Several additions to both the interior and exterior of the church were made after a fire in 1572 under the leadership of Franciscus Pahr, known for his work on castles. The turret and pinnacles which can be seen in older drawings were added as well as the first spires on the west towers which were designed by Antonius Watz. In the 1690s, Nicodemus Tessin designed a new burial chapel to the east of the south transept, the most significant alteration to the plan of the cathedral since the Middle Ages. From the outside, his design respected the traditions of medieval architecture with tall Gothic windows but the interior was decorated in Tessin's usual Classical Baroque style.

The cathedral in 1699, just prior to being sigificantly damaged in the fire of 1702

The cathedral in 1770, after having been repaired and reopened

The cathedral following after its 1880s renovation by Zetterwall

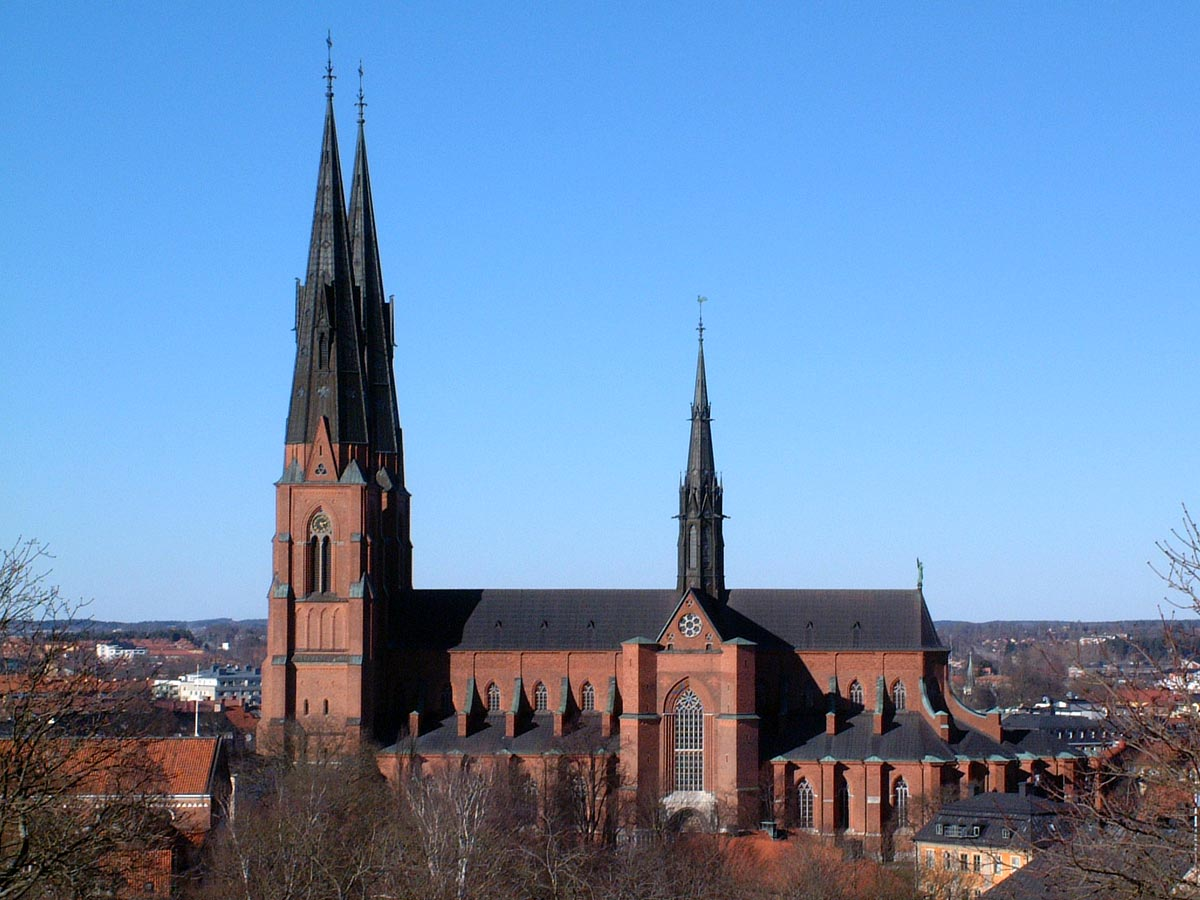
A modern view, showing changes from the 20th century

In the 17th century, the towers were redesigned in the Dutch Renaissance style but after the serious fire of 1702 they were temporarily replaced by low wooden tops. At the same time, the buttresses were removed giving the cathedral the rather plain look conveyed by pictures of the period. Only in 1740 were copper-faced spires installed, designed by Carl Hårleman. At the same time, Hårleman carried out significant work on the west façade. Today's towers are the work of Helgo Zettervall who completely rebuilt them in the 1880s, substantially increasing their height. After the serious fire of 1702, the original flying buttresses were removed and a higher roof was built.

Although the cathedral was designed by French architects, it exhibits a number of differences from the cathedrals of northern France. Above all, it is essentially constructed of brick rather than stone. Brick could easily be produced locally but stone had to be imported from the distant quarries of Gotland. As bricks and mortar are not as strong as stone, the walls had to be thicker although the pillars needed to support the vaulted ceiling of the chancel were made of limestone (although those in the nave are of brick). The north transept portal is also built of limestone, no doubt as it was needed to support the rose window, also structured in limestone itself. While the chancel and the transept are clearly of French design, the nave which was built somewhat later displays German and Swedish characteristics. Constructed in about 1330, the rose window over the northeast portal is still entirely French. Nicolaus from Västerås, the Swede who directed work on the nave from the 1360s, appears to have slightly modified the original plans, adding confessional side-chapels and including a few features of German origin. Cross-vaults were nevertheless installed, rather than star-shaped vaults which were more common at the time. Work on the western end of the building began in 1431 with the construction of the west portal which was influenced by the style of Vadstena Abbey. The towers, however, still exhibited features typical of 13th-century French architecture, indicating that the original plans were still in use at the time. Overall, despite minor differences, Uppsala Cathedral still reflects the style of the 13th-century cathedrals of northern France.

== Interior ==
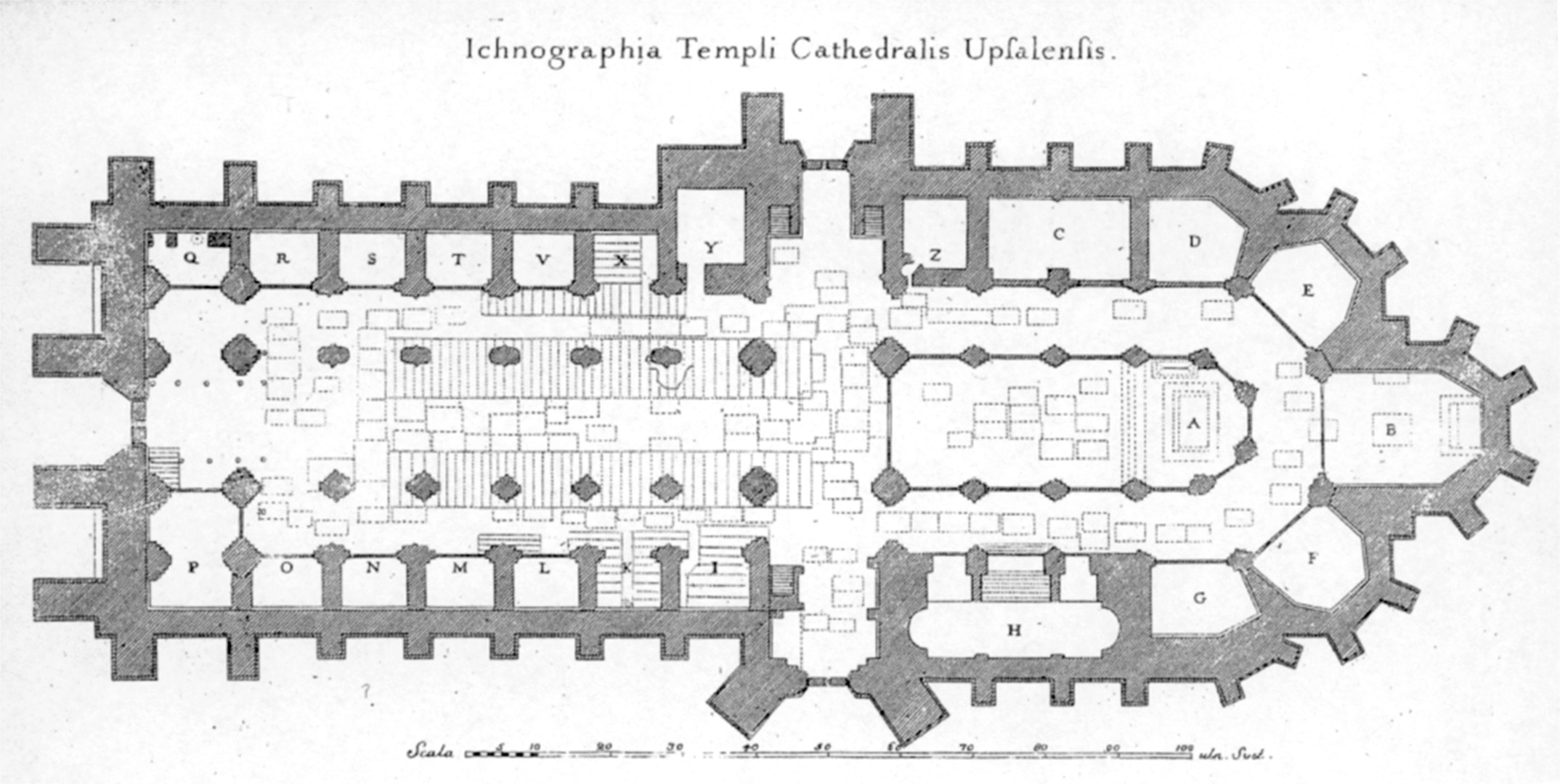
Ground plan (1770)

The Coronation Vault stands 27 m (89 ft) above the point at which the transept crosses the nave. It is where most of Sweden's monarchs were crowned from the Middle Ages until 1719. During the restoration in the 1880s, the interior ceiling and walls of the cathedral were decorated in the Neo-Gothic style. Some depictions, such as one of the Reformation's Martin Luther, added figures beyond the cathedral's medieval heritage. During the renovation work carried out in the 1970s, many of the medieval frescoes which had been whitewashed over after the Reformation were uncovered and restored. The high altar is used for the cathedral's services on the most important feast days in the church calendar. It is also here that all Swedish bishops are ordained. The silver chandelier is from 1647. The large crucifix in silver and crystal from Orrefors was installed in 1976.

The nave

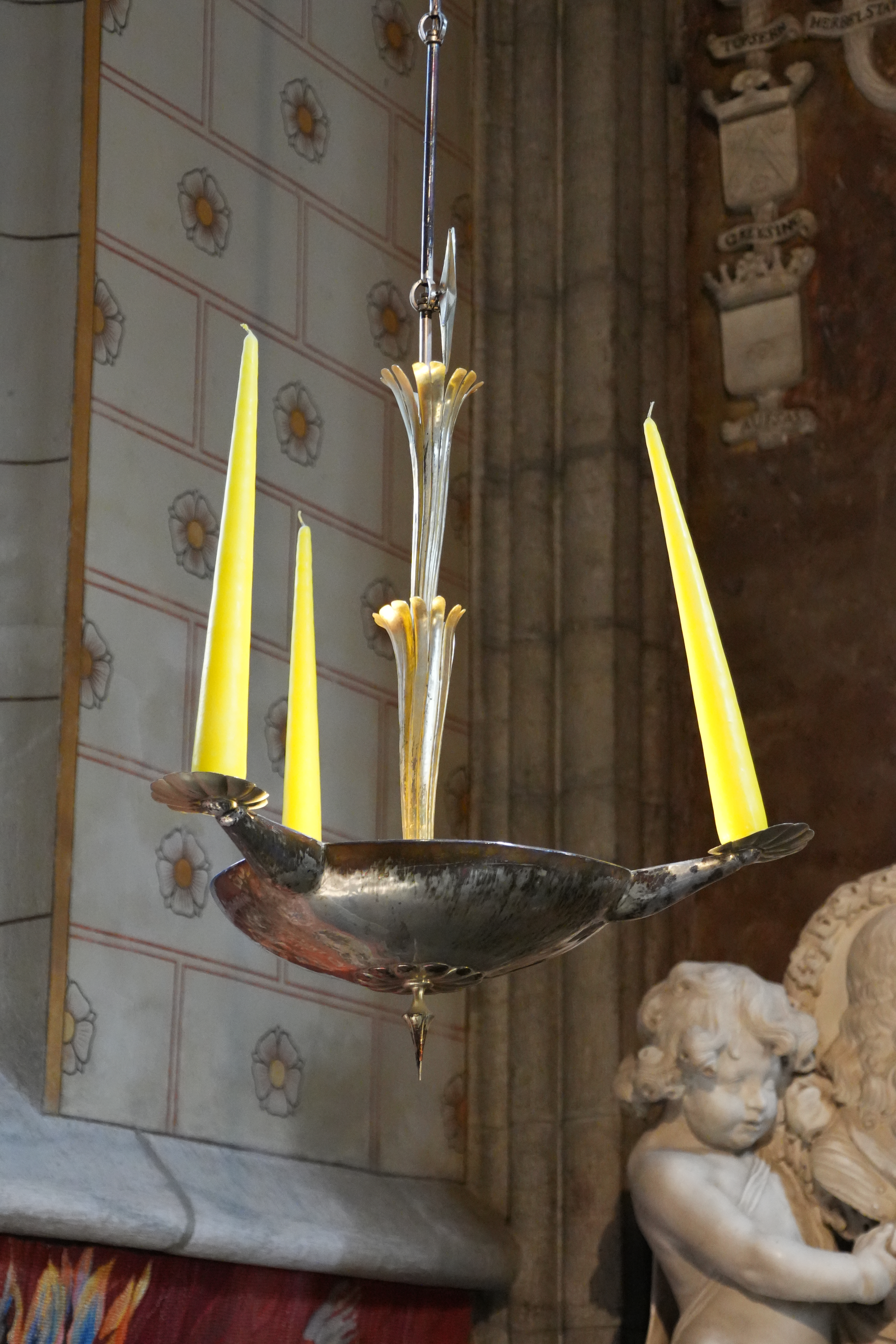
A lamp in the von Dohn side choir gifted by the Ethiopian emperor Haile Selassie

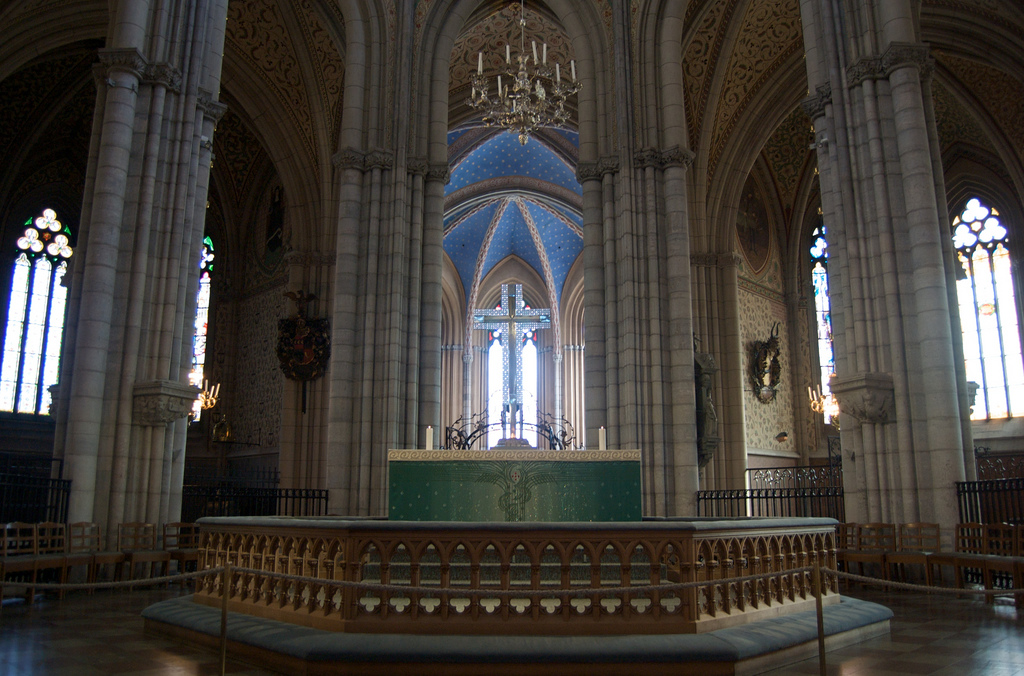
The high altar

=== Chapels ===
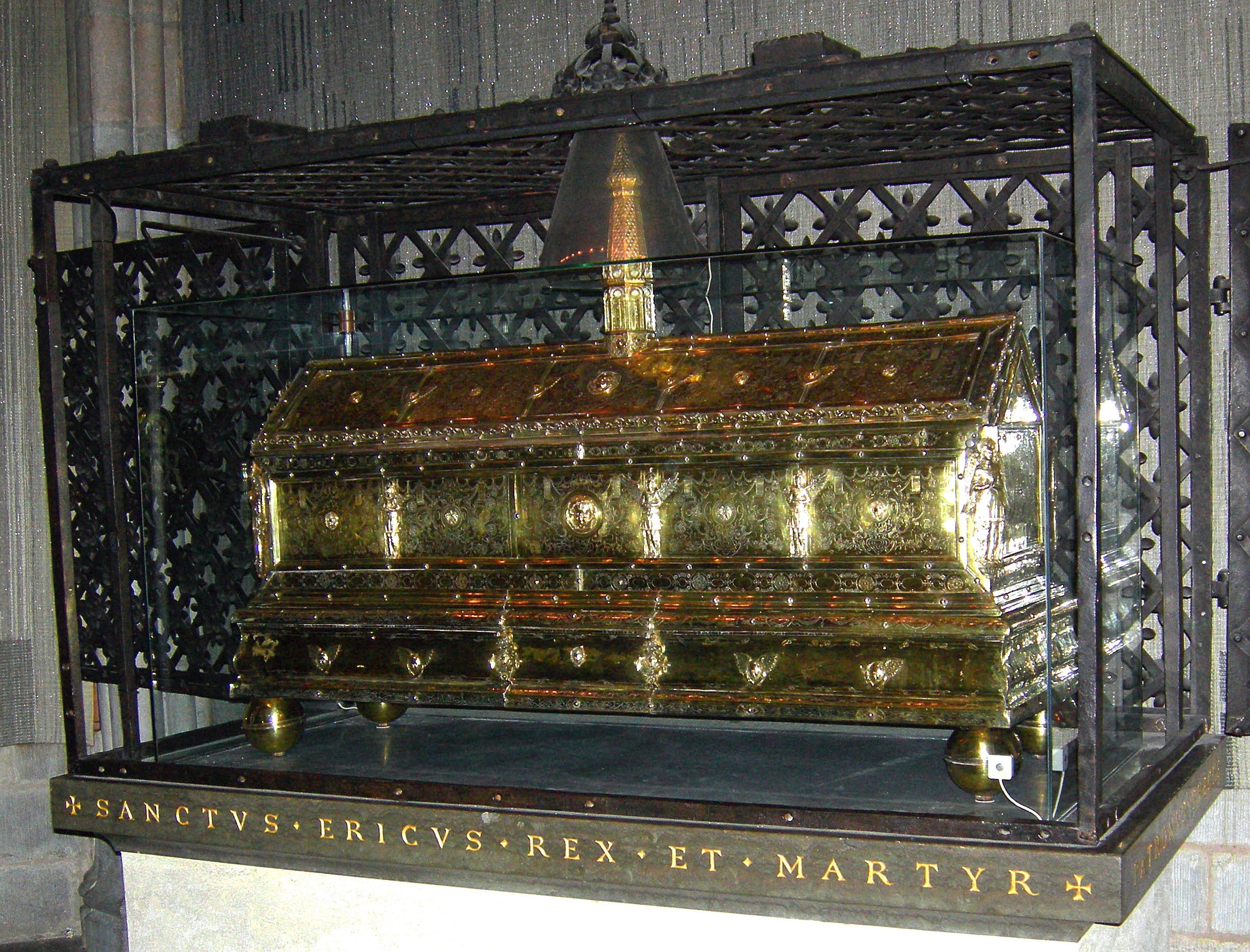
St Eric's shrine

The cathedral's largest chapel, the Vasa Chapel, at the eastern end of the chancel, was originally known as the Chapel of the Virgin Mary. It later became a burial monument for Gustav Vasa and his family. Completed in 1583, it is decorated with the national arms of Sweden as well as with some of the oldest known Swedish and Finnish coats of arms. The Finsta Chapel or St Eric's Chapel on the north-west corner of the chancel houses the relics of Eric the Holy, the patron saint of Sweden, who was killed in 1160 on the site where Uppsala Cathedral was later built. His shrine was moved from the first cathedral in Gamla Uppsala as soon as work began on the new building. In 1580, King John III melted his shrine down but replaced it with a new gold-plated one which still contains Eric's relics and crown. The name Finsta originates from the Uppland estate where Judge Birger Persson and his wife were born. They were entombed in the chapel in 1328. A relic of their daughter Saint Bridget housed in a small gold-plated shrine was donated by the Saint Bridget Order in 1990.

Next to the Finsta Chapel, the Sture Chapel is the memorial tomb of the three members of the Sture family who were murdered by King Eric XIV in 1567. The reredos (1520) depicts the story of Mary's parents, Anne and Joachim. At the end of the 16th century, the church's sacristy was converted into a burial chapel for Queen Catherine Jagiellon or Katarina Jagiellonica, the wife of King John III, who is also entombed there. The Jagellonica Chapel takes its name from her. The monument, crowned by a marble vault, was designed by Willem Boy.

=== Windows ===
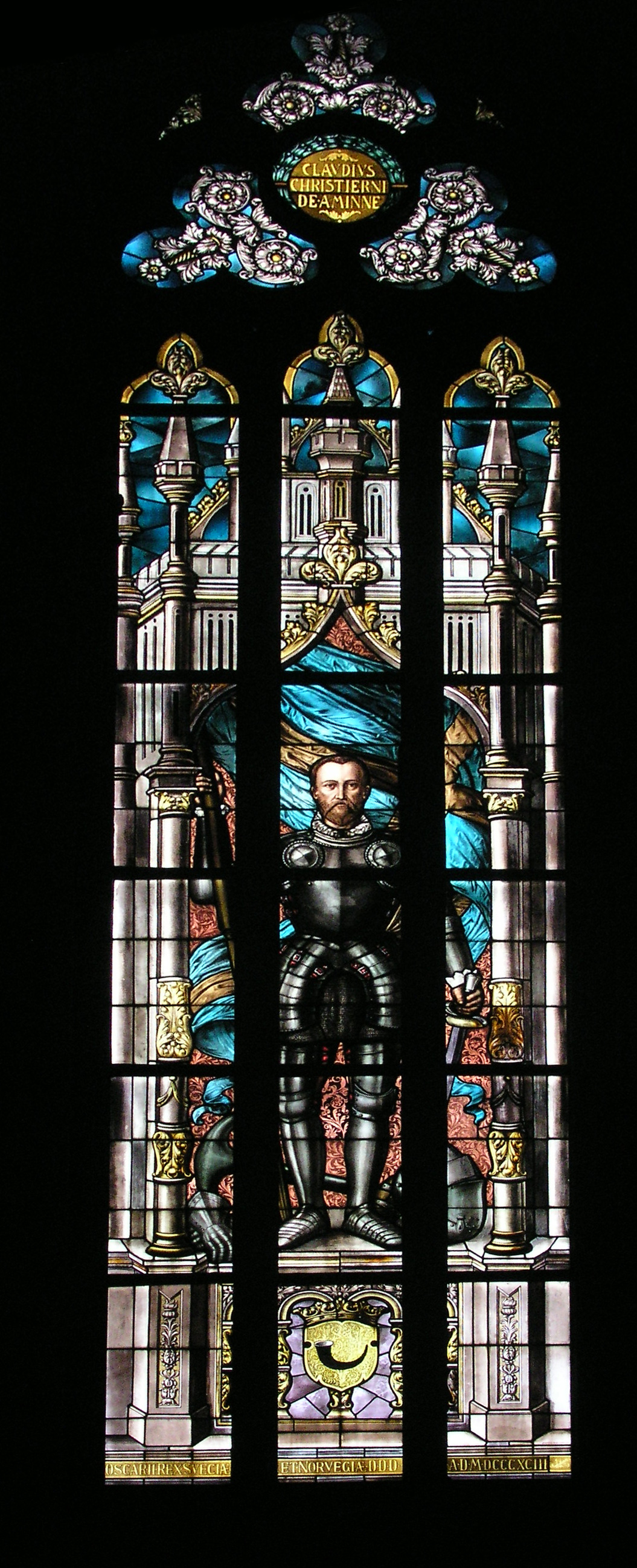
Stained-glass window dated to 1893

Several windows maintain their original shape and size. The original stained-glass decorations were almost all lost in the 1702 fire and were simply replaced by normal glass. The current stained-glass designs were added during the renovation at the end of the 19th century, most of them by the Gothenburg firm, Svenska Glasmåleri. The large windows above the portals depict the Trinity: God the Father over the west door, God the Son above the south door (the largest in the church), and God the Holy Spirit above the north door. Crafted in limestone, the rose window at the north portal is the oldest, unchanged since the 13th century.

=== Treasury and artefacts ===
Located in the north tower, the cathedral Treasury Museum displays a number of gold and silver articles used in the religious services. There is also a collection of textiles including Queen Margaret's golden gown. The burial regalia of Gustav Vasa, John III and their wives can also be seen.

Other artefacts in the cathedral include tapestries in the Chapel of Remembrance from 1976 which record important events in the cathedral's history. The ornate pulpit (1710), the largest in Sweden, was designed by Nicodemus Tessin and carved by Burchard Precht. It was a gift from Queen Hedvig Eleonora after the fire of 1702. Decorations include John the Baptist preaching in the desert, Saint Paul in Athens and the parable of the Labourers in the Vineyard.

One of the new bells installed after the devastating fire of 1702 is called Thornan. It was taken from Toruń, Poland as war booty in 1703 by the Swedish forces of Carl XII during the Great Northern War.

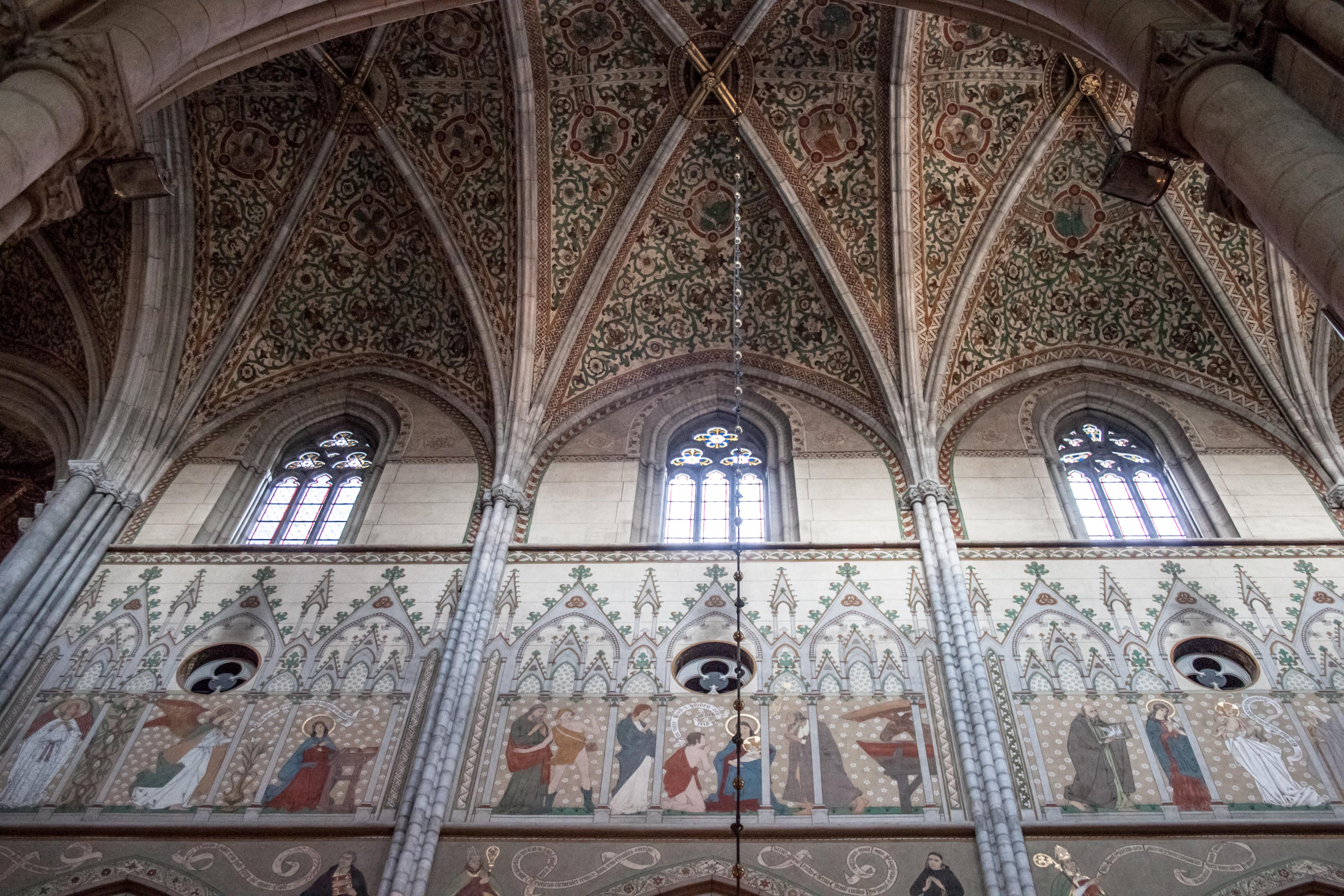
Frescos on the nave walls and ceiling

In the Vasa Chapel, there are seven large fresco paintings executed by Johan Gustaf Sandberg (1782–1854) over a period of several years. They depict important events in the life of Gustav Vasa. One of the most famous is Talet till dalkarlarna vid Mora kyrka (Speech to the people of Dalarna outside Mora Church). Frescos also decorate the vaults of the nave.

Initially, as in some of the continental cathedrals, the interior was decorated with designs emphasizing the arch ribs and portal components. Even the brick was painted with red and white stripes. In the 15th century, frescos of figures in the Late Gothic style with decorative vine leaves were painted in various parts of the church. Traces of these have been found in the chancel and in the chapel which was originally dedicated to St Eric and St Olaf. They have now been heavily restored. The frescos in the chancel were probably painted by Albertus Pictor's workshop.

=== Judensau ===
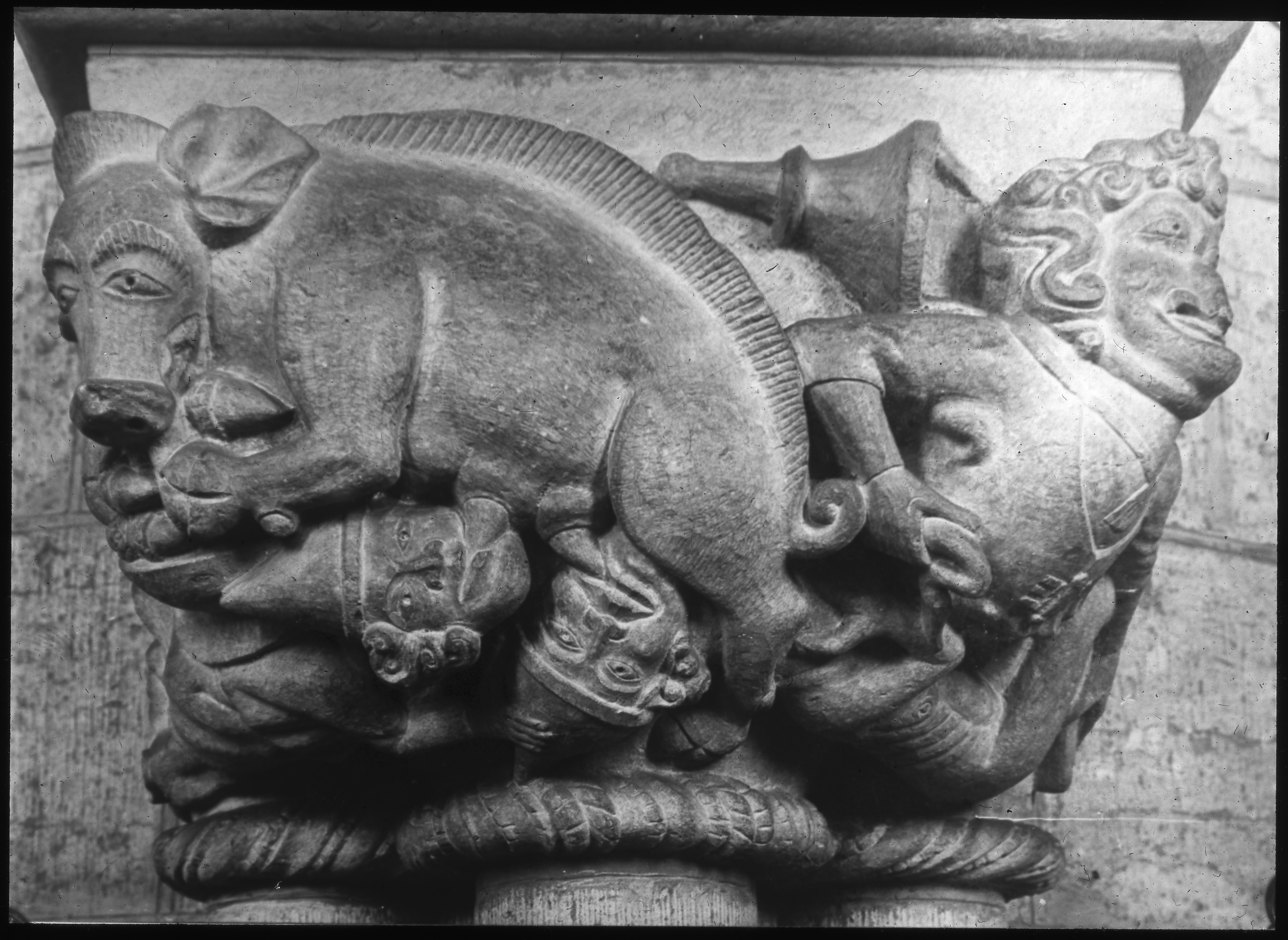
The Uppsala Judensau

The cathedral features a Judensau ("Jews' sow") that depicts several Jewish men suckling a pig. The Uppsala Judensau is likely the work of a travelling German artist, given the popularity of the antisemitic motif in German-speaking lands.

== Interred notables ==
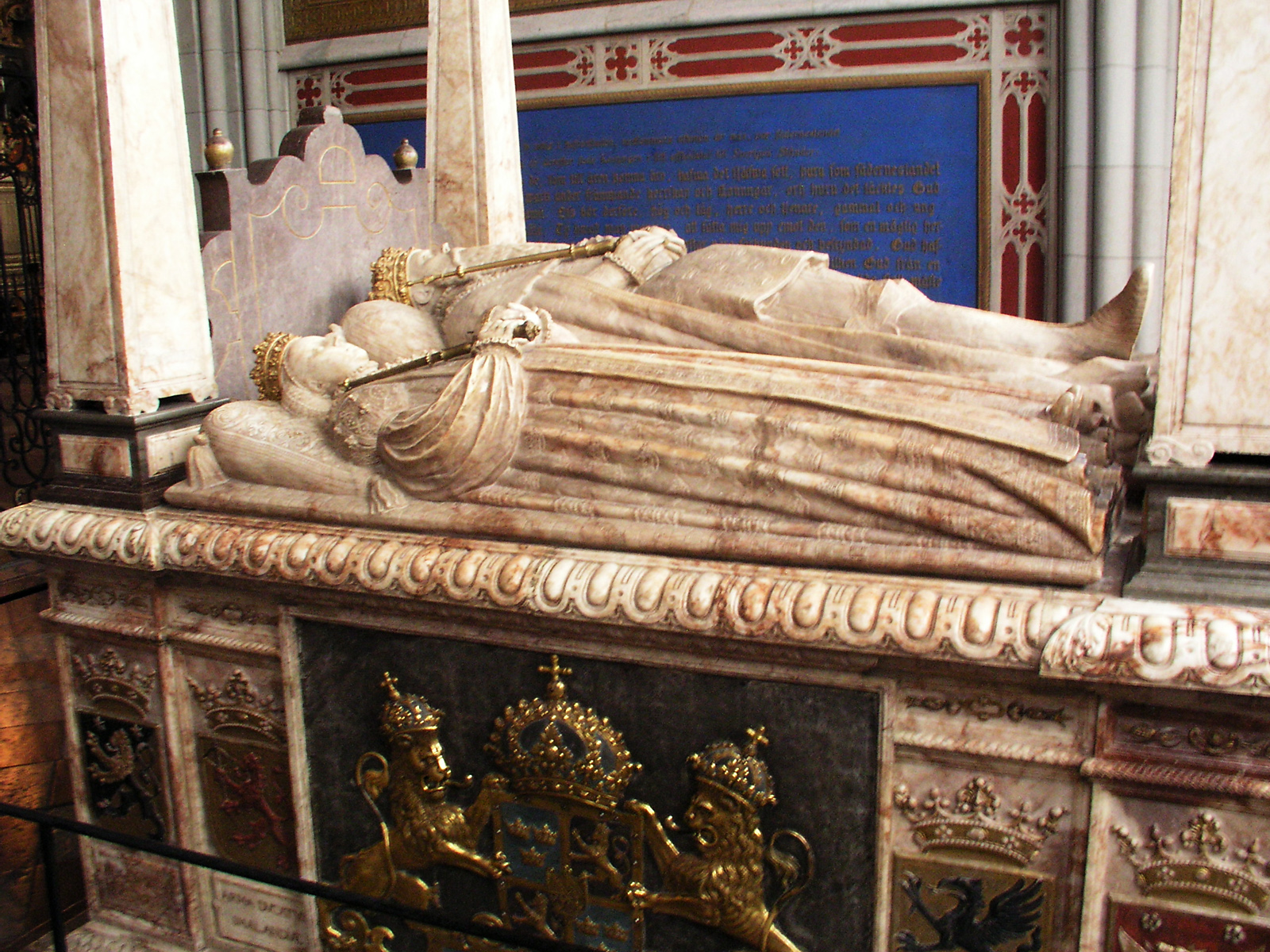
Tomb of King Gustav Vasa and his consorts

A number of Swedish monarchs and other notable people were buried inside the cathedral:

- Gustav Vasa, 16th-century King of Sweden. Nearly a decade before his death, he had expressed a wish to be buried in the cathedral. He is buried with his three wives, although only two are depicted on the sarcophagus designed by Willem Boy. The king and his wives are interred in what was once the Chapel of the Virgin Mary. The only remaining indication of the original intention of the chapel are the painted yellow stars against a blue background on its vaulted ceiling, symbols of Saint Mary in Catholic tradition.
- John III (died 1592), the second son of Gustav Vasa, and his second wife Gunilla Bielke are also buried in the Virgin Mary Chapel. His first wife, Catherine Jagiellon from Poland, has a burial chapel of her own on the north side of the chancel.
- Princess Elizabeth (died 1597), Gustav Vasa's youngest daughter is buried in the Finsta Chapel adjacent to Virgin Mary's Chapel.
- The noblemen Svante Sture (1517–1567) and his sons Nils (1543–1567) and Erik (1546–1567) who were all killed by Erik XIV in the Sture Murders are entombed in the Sture Chapel. The clothes they were wearing at the time of their death are displayed in the Treasury Museum.
- Carl Linnaeus (1707–1778), the 18th-century world-famous botanist and professor at Uppsala University, has a memorial designed by Tobias Sergel next to the Chapel of Remembrance.
- Charles De Geer (1720–1778), industrialist, civil servant and entomologist.
- Olaus Rudbeck, Swedish polymath and one of the discoverers of the lymphatic system.
- Emanuel Swedenborg, 18th-century scientist and mystic. He was not originally interred here, but his remains were transported to Uppsala from England in 1908.
- Nathan Söderblom (1866–1931), archbishop of Uppsala and Nobel Peace Prize recipient. His tomb is at the foot of the steps to the high altar.
- Eric the Saint, 12th-century king and national saint, whose relics are in the Finsta Chapel.
- Laurentius Petri (1499–1573), Sweden's first Lutheran archbishop, buried at the foot of the altar steps.
- Relics of Saint Bridget or Heliga Birgitta (1303–1373) have been placed in a shrine in the Finsta Chapel inspired by the clothing of the Saint Bridget Order.
- Folke Johansson Ängel, Archbishop of Uppsala (1267–1277)

=== Dag Hammarskjöld memorial ===
In the cathedral there is a small memorial to Dag Hammarskjöld, former Secretary-General of the United Nations, who was posthumously awarded the Nobel Peace Prize. A stone bears the inscription:

Icke jag
utan Gud i mig

Dag Hammarskjöld 1905–1961

The English translation is "Not I, but God in me."

== Open to visitors ==
The cathedral is located on Domkyrkoplan in the centre of Uppsala. It is open to visitors most days from 8 am to 6 pm. The Treasury Museum in the north tower is open from 10 am to 4 pm, Sundays from 12.30 pm.

== See also ==
- Archbishop of Uppsala
- Church of Sweden
- Temple at Uppsala

== Bibliography ==
- Augustsson, Jan-Erik; Blennow, Anna-Maria; Piltz, Anders; et al. (1996). Den gotiska konsten. Signums svenska konsthistoria (in Swedish). Signum. ISBN 91-87896-25-7.
- Boëthius, Gerda; Romdahl, Axel Ludwig (1935). Uppsala Domkyrka 1258–1435. Almqvist & Wiksells boktryckeri a.-b. Archived from the original on 10 June 2016.
- Clemensson, Per; Andersson, Kjell (2004). Your Swedish Roots: A Step by Step Handbook. Ancestry Publishing. ISBN 978-1-59331-276-3. Archived from the original on 28 October 2013.
- Eade, Paul (2013). DK Eyewitness Top 10 Travel Guide: Stockholm. Dorling Kindersley Limited. ISBN 978-1-4093-2328-0. Archived from the original on 30 April 2016.
- Franzon, Annika (2005). Nya guideboken om Uppsala domkyrka. Uppsala Publishing House. ISBN 978-91-7005-287-3. Archived from the original on 3 June 2016.
- Jaworski, Tomasz; Nasieniewski, Marek; Przegiętka, Krzysztof (2001). Secrets of the old bells of Toruń and Chełmno written down in the 500th anniversary of the casting of the great Tuba Dei. TNOiK. ISBN 978-83-7285-054-6. Archived from the original on 16 May 2016.
- Kjellberg, Erik (2010). The Dissemination of Music in Seventeenth-century Europe: Celebrating the Düben Collection : Proceedings from the International Conference at Uppsala University 2006. Peter Lang. ISBN 978-3-0343-0057-5. Archived from the original on 29 June 2016.
- Lovén, Christian (2009). "La neige, les briques et l'architecte français. La cathédrale d'Uppsala 1272— in Regards sur la France du Moyen Âge. Mélanges offerts à Gunnel Engwall., eds. Olle Ferm & Per Förnegård. Stockholm 2009". Regards Sur la France du Moyen Âge. Mélanges Offerts À Gunnel Engwall (Sällskapet Runica et Mediævalia). Stockholm 2009 (in French). Stockholm: Sällskapet Runica et Mediævalia. Archived from the original on 10 November 2021.
- Nordström, Folke (1952). Studier i Uppsala domkyrkas äldsta byggnadshistoria. Almqvist & Wiksell. Archived from the original on 22 May 2016.
- Uppsala domkyrka 1–6 (Sveriges kyrkor 227–232)(2010), Upplandsmuseet, Kungl. Vitterhets Historie och Antikvitets Akademien & Riksantikvarieämbetet. Uppsala.
- Zeitler, Rudolf (1971), "Die Baugeschichte des Doms zu Uppsala. Aspekte zur Kunstgeschichte von Mittelalter und Neuzeit" in Karl Heinz Clasen zum 75. Geburtstag, Weimar, Böhlaus, pp. 359–386.
