= Franciscus Pahr =

Italian architect

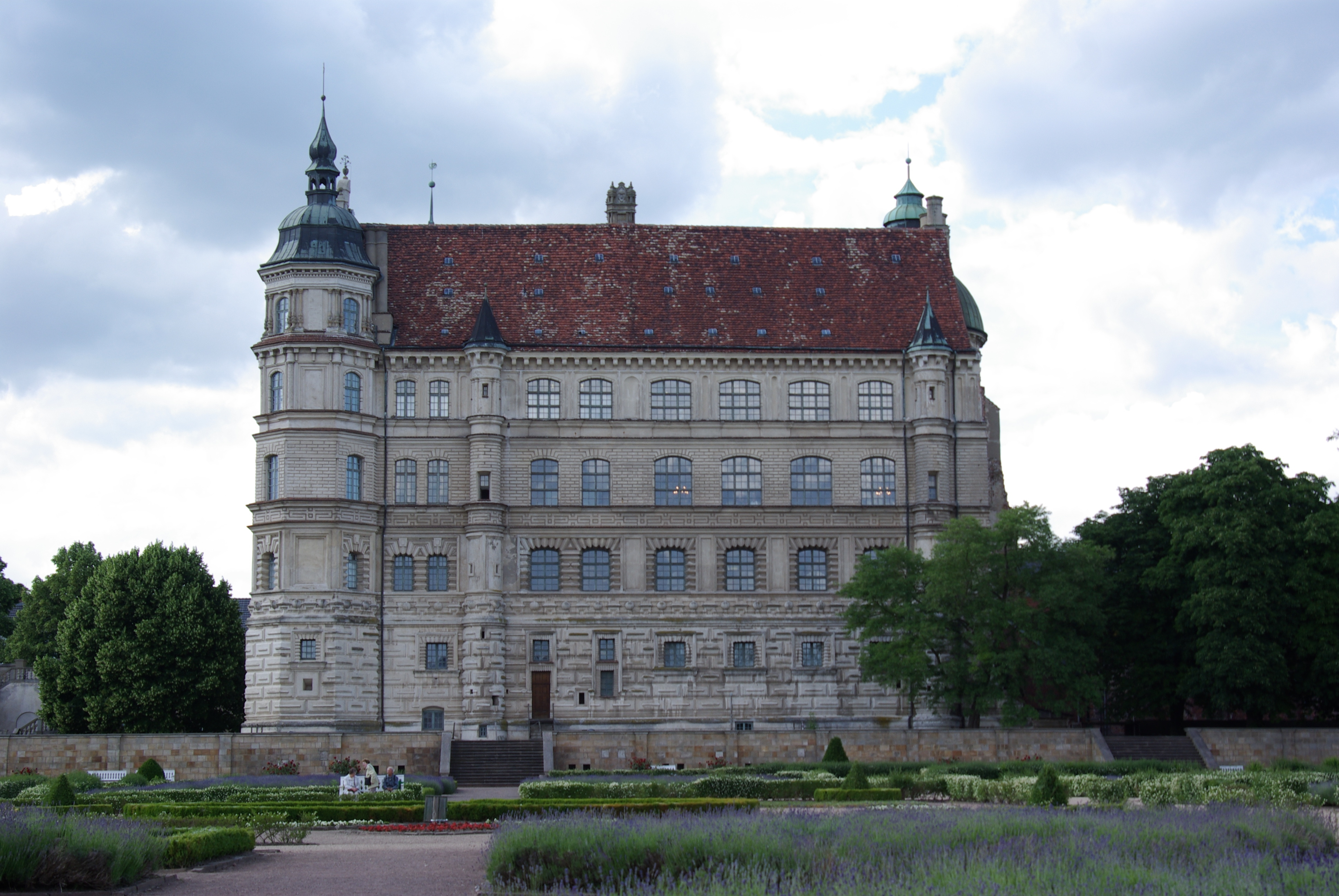
Güstrow Castle designed by Franciscus Pahr

Franciscus Pahr (died 1580) was an Italian architect who worked in Silesia and Sweden from the 1550s. He is remembered above all for his work in Uppsala where he contributed to the cathedral and castle. He refurbished the Upsala castle completely after the fire of 1572. Pahr was from a family of architects who worked in Germany and Sweden during the later part of 16th century and were instrumental in introducing Renaissance architecture to northern Europe. One of the first projects in this genre in Germany was Pahr's work at Uppsala. However Uppsala is located in Sweden.

== Biography ==
Pahr was almost certainly the son of master builder Jacob Pahr from Milan and the brother of Johan Baptista Pahr, Christoffer Pahr and Dominicus Pahr. Pahr was described to have "come from Milan via Brieg, Güstrow and Rostock". The Pahr family brought Italian and German Renaissance architecture to Sweden. In the 1550s, together with his father and Dominicus, Pahr contributed to building the Silesian Brzeg Castle of Brzeg and supervised the construction of fortifications at Rostock and Schwerin. He probably also built the Castle of Löwenberg (now Lwówek Śląski).

In 1558, he entered into an agreement with Duke Ulrich of Mecklenburg-Güstrow to build a castle in Güstrow, which he supervised until 1565. He used brick as the main building material.

In 1572, King Johan III of Sweden invited Pahr and his older brother Domenicus Pahr (de Pari), to build the Upsala castle. After the castle's fire, Pahr was retained to rebuild it as Domenicus had become sick; he oversaw the rebuilding process in 1572. The garden plan for this castle was also designed by Pahr. In 1573, he took over the building of the new Stockholm Palace after Anders Larsson Målare became ill. In 1578, he supervised work on the restoration of Uppsala Cathedral which had also been damaged by the 1572 fire, reconstructing the towers in the Renaissance style. In August 1580, Pahr died before completing this assignment.

His son, Dominicus Pahr, was a German architect.
