= Jonas Lindvall =

Swedish architect and designer

Jonas Lindvall MFA, MSA-SIR is a Swedish architect and designer.

Originally educated as an interior architect at HDK in Gothenburg, Sweden from 1989 to 1993, he went on to study furniture design, firstly at Royal College of Art in London in 1992 and then at the Royal Danish Academy of Fine Arts in Copenhagen in 1993. After finishing his studies, he returned to his hometown Malmö where he started his own architecture and design office, Lindvall A&D.

As an architect Lindvall came to prominence after his award-winning design for the Izakaya Koi restaurant in Sweden earned him the "Golden Chair", a prestigious national award given by the Swedish Association of Architects. As a furniture designer he has made several prize winning pieces including the Oak chair which was awarded the “Furniture of The Year” award in 2001. Beyond this, he has also been awarded the “Excellent Swedish Design award” on 4 separate occasions.
