= Archbishop's Palace, Uppsala =

Coordinates: 59°51′26.75″N 17°37′52.48″E

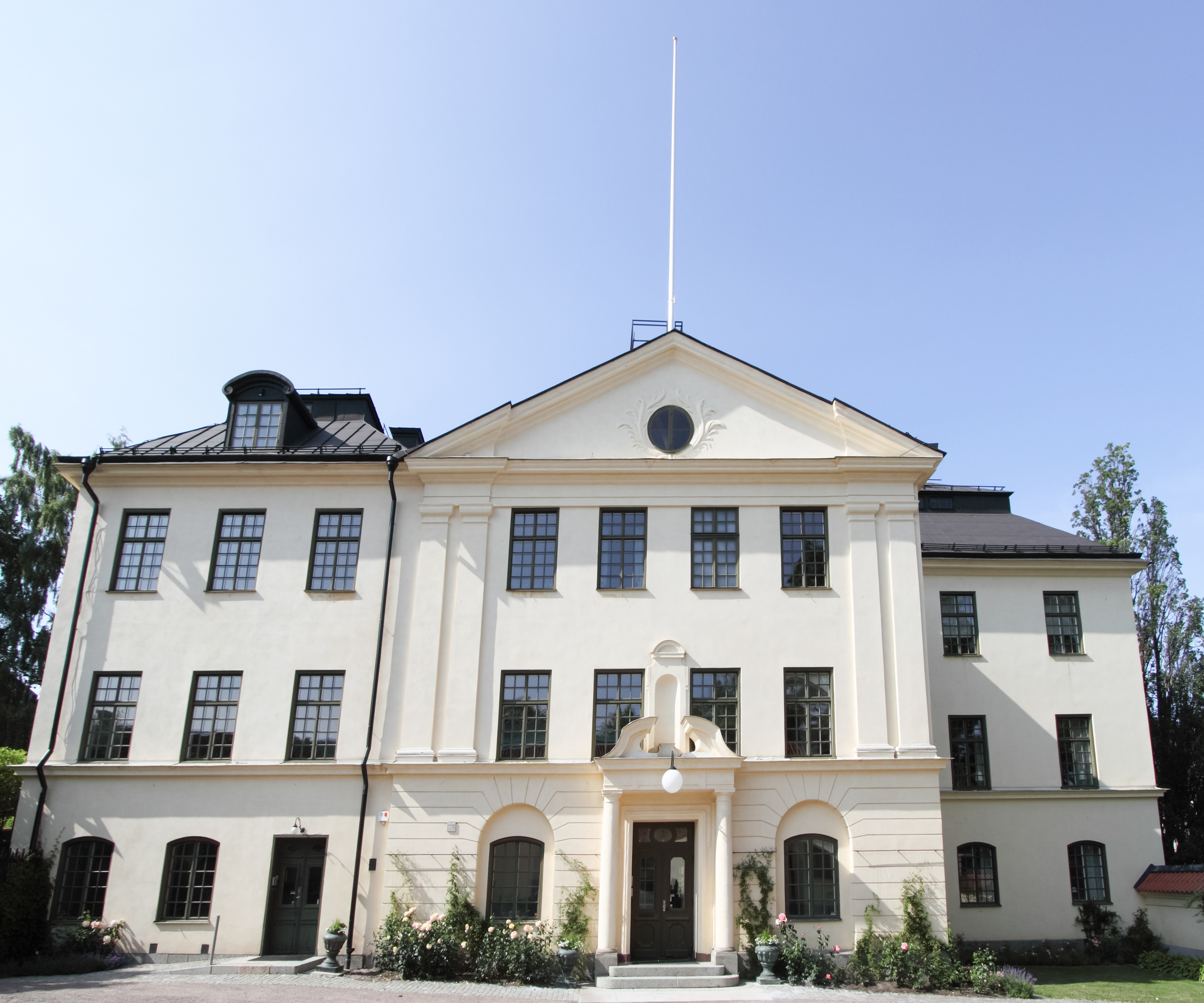
The Archbishop's Palace in Uppsala in 2013, designed in the 18th century by the architect Carl Hårleman, but built on older foundations.

The Archbishop's Palace (Swedish: Ärkebiskopsgården) in Uppsala, Sweden, is the official residence of the Lutheran Archbishop of Uppsala, the primate of the Church of Sweden. It was designed by Carl Hårleman and first completed in 1744, on or close to the site of several earlier buildings previously serving a similar role. The palace is situated facing the University Park, close to Uppsala Cathedral in the old city centre, west of the river.

== History ==
=== The medieval Archbishop's castle ===
A fortified castle for the Archbishops of Uppsala was erected close to the site during the 14th century on the site of the present day University Park. The castle was improved upon during the 15th century, with added towers and fortifications. It was burned and partly destroyed in 1497 and again in 1521 during the Swedish wars against Denmark. The castle was restored and further extended as a royal palace during the reign of King Gustav I of Sweden but gradually fell out of use when the new Uppsala Castle was built in the 1550s, after which the old castle for many years served a subsidiary role to the new castle and was used as a source of building material for its extension. A royal stable was built in 1620, and in the mid-17th century only the foundations of the castle remained. The land was taken over by Uppsala University and used for a riding school for young noblemen. Extensive remnants of the northern tower were found during construction of the present University Hall and University Park during the 1880s. The nearby street Rundelsgränd is named after the tower remnants.

=== Present-day palace ===
The present palace was built on the site of a previous building from the 14th century, the Dean's house, which from 1691 temporarily served as the Archbishop's residence. Parts of the medieval cellars and foundation have been incorporated in the present building. In 1737 construction started on the new palace, designed by Carl Hårleman, and the building was completed in 1744. The two wings, subsidiary buildings and servant's quarters were added during the 18th century and an additional floor was added to the main building in 1767.

In 1879 the wall surrounding the ground plot was built. The main building was extensively rebuilt in 1901 and declared a national listed building in 1935. In 1993 a statue honouring former Archbishop and Nobel Peace Prize Laureate Nathan Söderblom was placed next to the palace walls.

Since the official separation of the Church of Sweden from the state in 2000 the palace is owned by the Church of Sweden and remains in use as the official residence of the Archbishop.
