= University Park, Uppsala =

Park in Uppsala, Sweden

Coordinates: 59°51′29″N 17°37′50″E

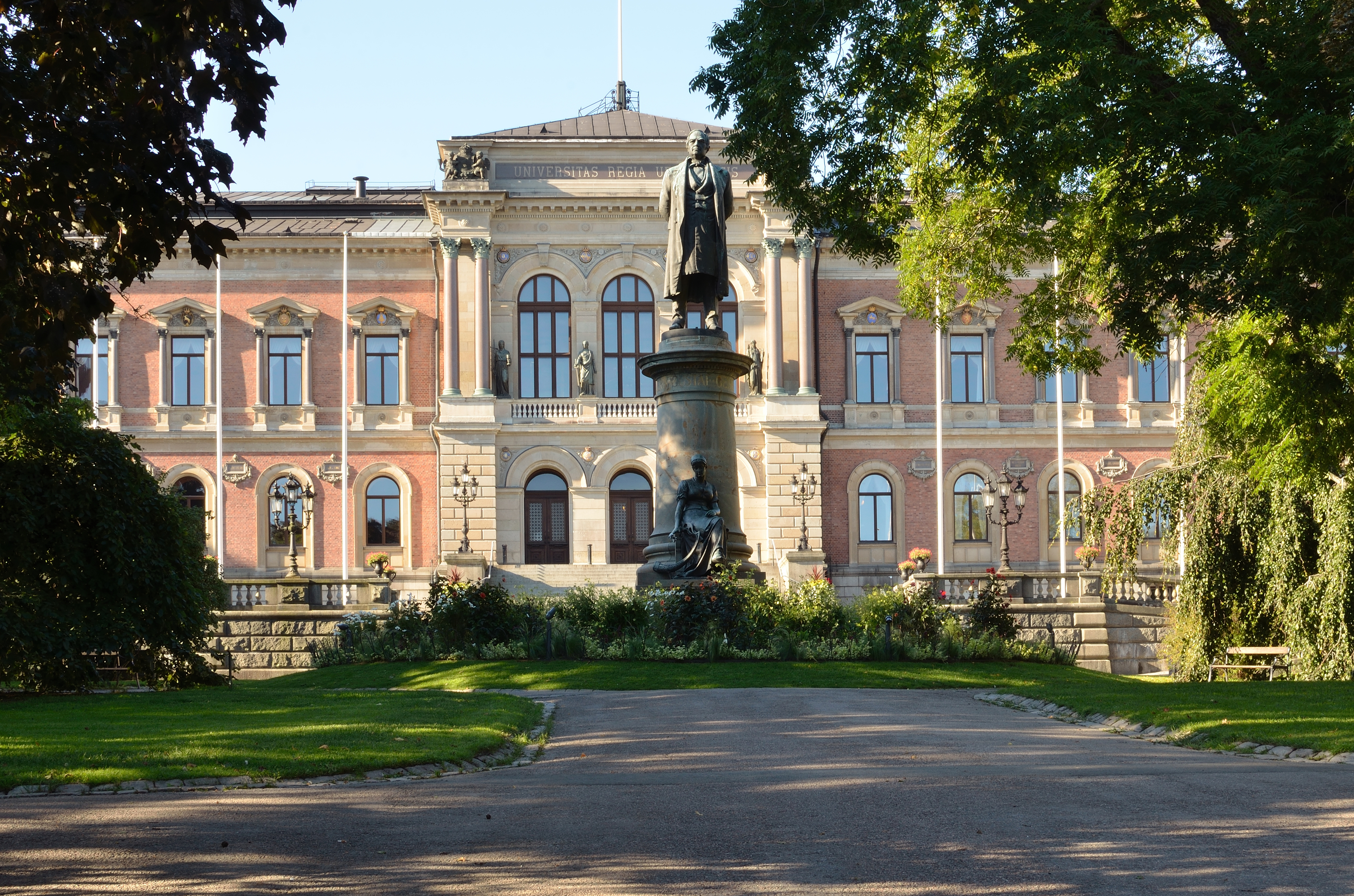
University Park, view towards the Geijer monument and the University Main Building.

University Park (Swedish: Universitetsparken), is a public park in central Uppsala in Sweden, situated in the historical Fjärdingen district close to Uppsala Cathedral.

The park was created in its present form following the completion of the centrally situated University Main Building on the site during the 1880s, and retains much of its original character today. Many historical sights surround the park, including the 19th century University building, Södermanlands-Nerikes nation, Gustavianum, Ekerman House and the 18th-century Archbishop's Residence. Also situated next to the park is the modern Church of Sweden main administrative office building and the Fyrisbiografen cinema.

Before the University Main Building stands the monument to Erik Gustaf Geijer (1783–1847), poet and historian, which was sculpted by John Börjesson and erected in 1888. The six runestones displayed in the park were originally found in the city and its surrounding countryside.

== History ==
The site of University Park was the site of the medieval Archbishops' Castle, demolished in the 16th century following the Protestant Reformation and the construction of the royal castle of Uppsala in the southern part of the city. Before the creation of the park, the ruins including the lower levels of a round tower were still visible, which is the origin of the nearby street name Rundelsgränd. From the 17th to the 19th centuries the university's excercitia hall was situated here, where the upper-class students were able to practice riding, fencing, dancing and modern languages. The hall was situated approximately where the University Main Building is today, with a terraced garden surrounded by a fence.
