= Herman Teodor Holmgren =

Swedish architect

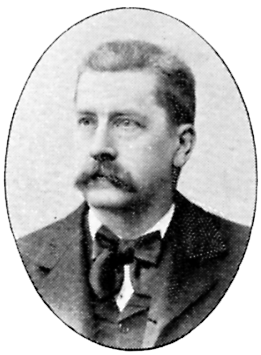
Herman Teodor Holmgren

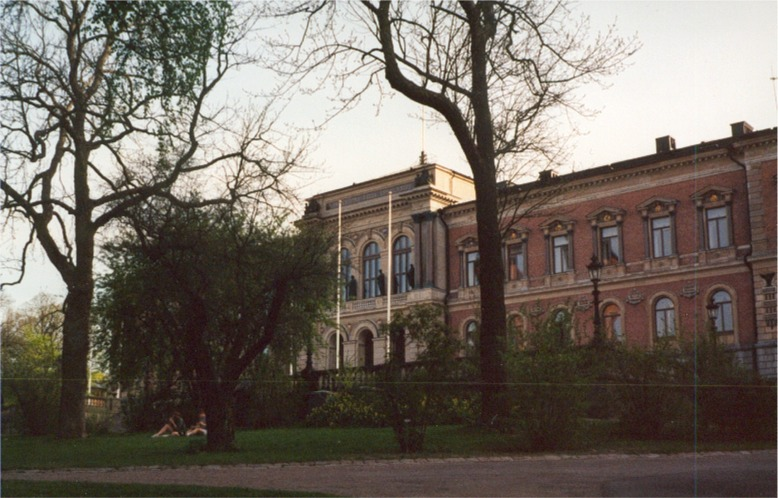
Uppsala University main building

Herman Teodor Holmgren (31 March 1842 – 24 May 1914) was a Swedish architect.

== Biography ==
He was born in Östad in Älvsborg County, Sweden. Holmgren studied at the architecture school of the Royal Swedish Academy of Arts 1863-1871, traveled on a scholarship from the Academy to Germany, France and Italy. He was employed as an architect in the First Surveyor's Office (Överintendentsämbetet), precursor of the current Swedish National Property Board from 1871 and was appointed surveyor for the Crown buildings in Stockholm in 1897. He became a member of the Royal Swedish Academy of Arts in 1887. He died 1914 in Stockholm.

Holmgren's most important work is the University Hall of Uppsala University, but he has also designed the building for the Sundsvalls enskilda bank (Sundsvall), the County Governor's residence in Jönköping (begun by Johan Fredrik Åbom), the County Administration buildings in Falun and Luleå and the deaf-mute schools in Härnösand, Gävle and Växjö.

== Other sources ==
- The article is a translation of J. Kruse, "Holmgren, Herman Teodor", Nordisk familjebok, 2nd ed., Vol. 11 (1909), col. 1009. Death date in Supplement volume.
