= Uppsala Castle =

Castle in Uppsala, Sweden

- Uppsala slott
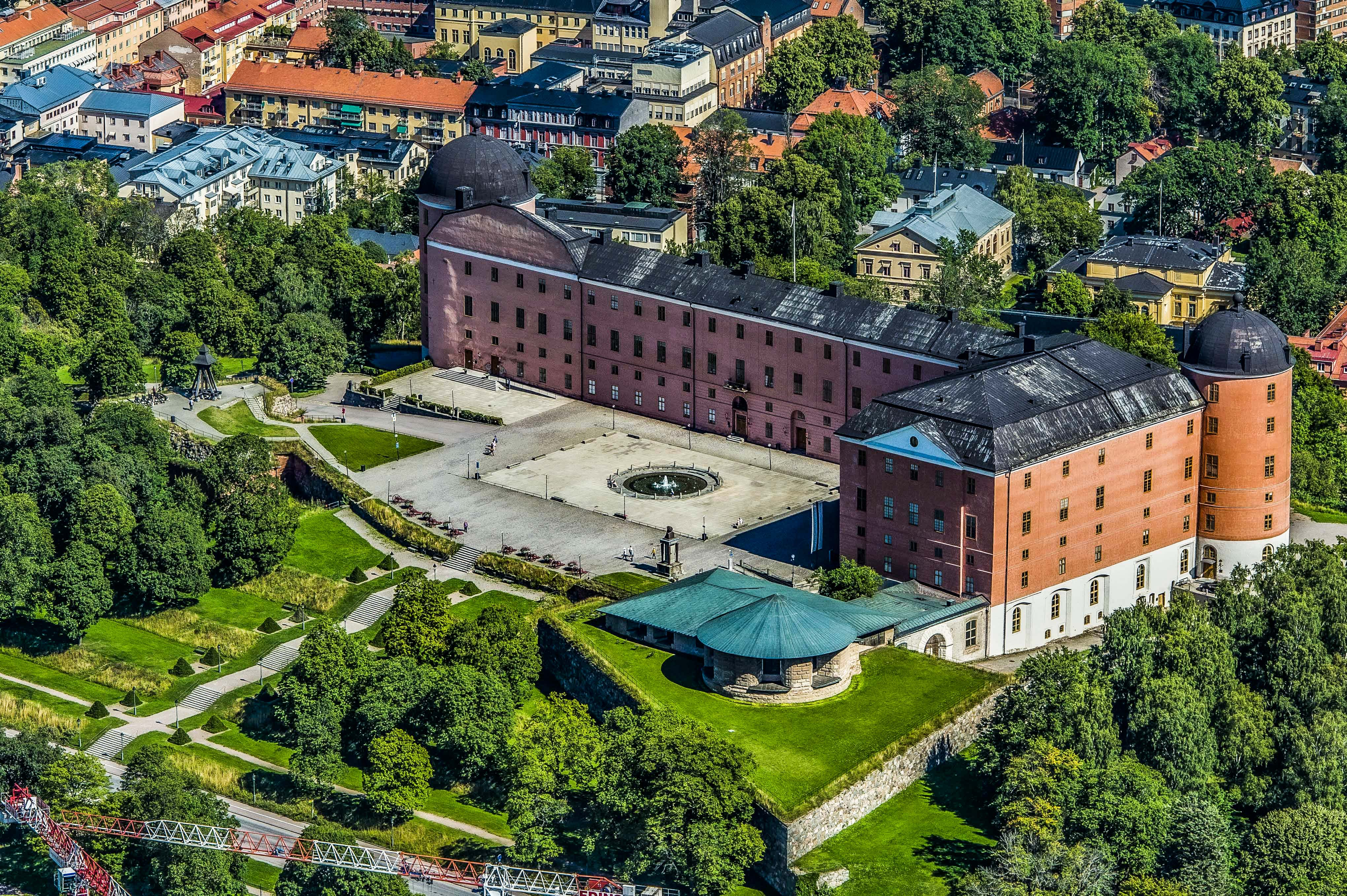

General information
- Type: Castle
- Location: Uppsala, Sweden
- Coordinates: 59°51′12″N 17°38′07″E
- Construction started: 1549
- Completed: 1762 (rebuild after fire)
- Renovated: several times

Website
- sfv.se/uppsala-slott (in Swedish)

Uppsala Castle (Swedish: Uppsala slott) is a 16th-century royal castle in the city of Uppsala, Sweden. Throughout much of its early existence, the castle played a major role in the history of Sweden. Originally constructed in 1549, the castle has been heavily remodeled, expanded, and otherwise modified. Today the structure houses the official residence of the governor of Uppsala County, various businesses, and museums.

== Older royal residences in Uppsala ==
Nearby Gamla Uppsala was an important religious and aristocratic center from at least the 5th century up until 1273 (when the Catholic archbishopric was moved to the area that became modern-day Uppsala). It had been at the end of the 5th century that the Yngling dynasty is known to have established themselves in Gamla Uppsala. Today, large royal burial mounds are extant and traces of ancient royal manors have been discovered at Gamla Uppsala.

In the Middle Ages a royal estate, known today as Föresäng, existed in an area of Uppsala called Islandet. This estate was destroyed by fire in 1543. During the Protestant reformation, a medieval archbishop's castle, which stood west of Uppsala Cathedral (near the site of the present-day Archbishop's Palace), was confiscated by the monarchy of Sweden. Both this castle and the Föresäng estate were used as early royal residences in Uppsala.

== History ==
Uppsala Castle was built during the reign of Gustav I Vasa, a period when Sweden was becoming a great power in Europe. After its initial construction, various monarchs remodelled and expanded the fortress into a representative Renaissance castle.

=== Gustav I Vasa ===
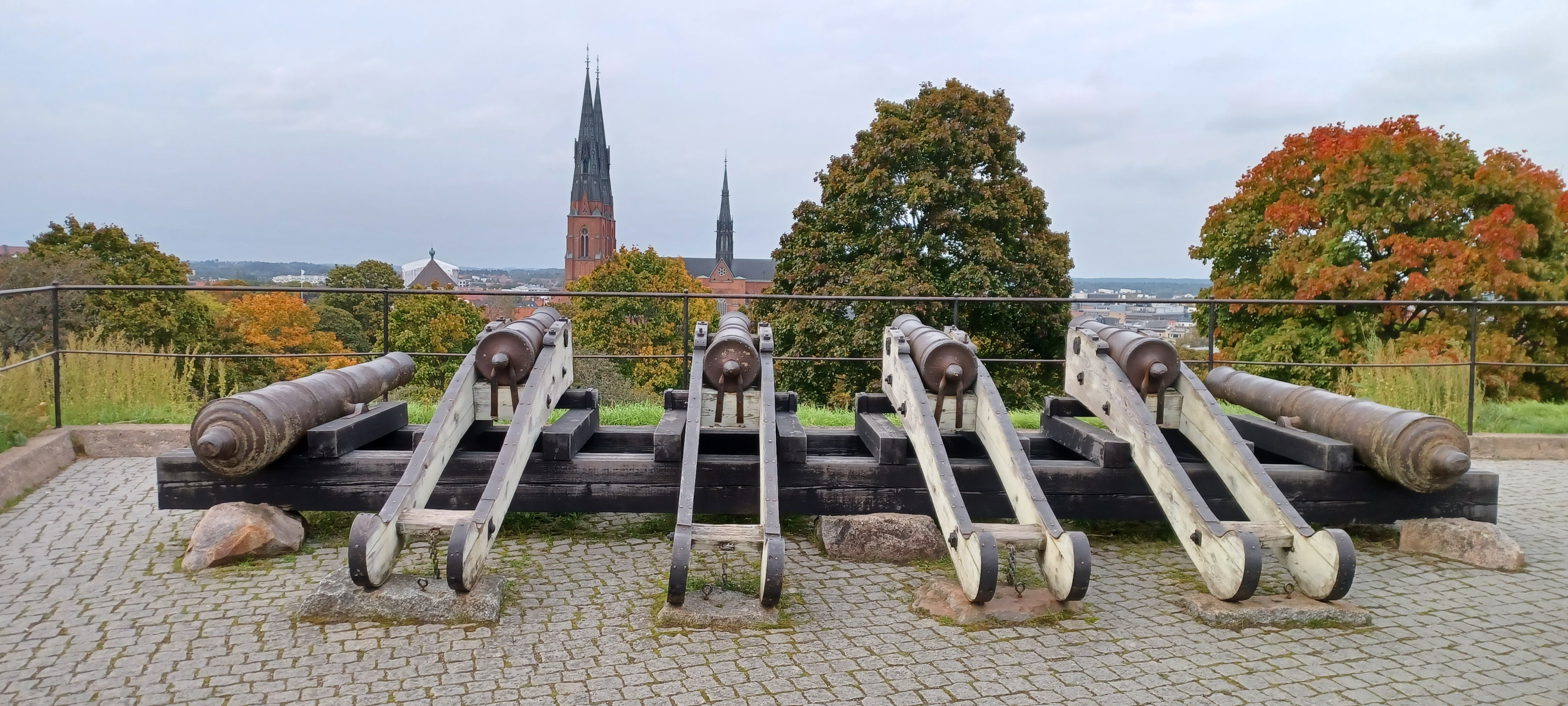
Trained on Uppsala cathedral, the Styrbiskop six gun battery was a genuine threat to the cathedral, and remains in place today.

Following a peasant uprising against Vasa's rule, known as the Dacke War, it was decided to build new defensive castles in the kingdom, including one in Uppsala. Construction of the castle started in 1549 atop a large esker called Kasåsen. The newly constructed complex included royal apartments in the south-west corner, and two large bastions on the western side. Both of these bastions, called respectively Gräsgården and Styrbiskop, remain a feature at the castle today, although only the foundations of the original royal apartments remain (and house Vasaborgen museum). Soon after the completion of the new castle, an addition to the east of the royal apartments was constructed, adding "representation premises" such as a hall of state and church. The Styrbiskop (Bishop-Controller) battery was permanently trained on Uppsala cathedral owing to the hostility between the church authorities and the king from the beginning of his reign.

=== Eric XIV ===
During the reign of Eric XIV the representation addition was completed. Also during his reign, the Sture murders took place in the castle.

=== John III ===
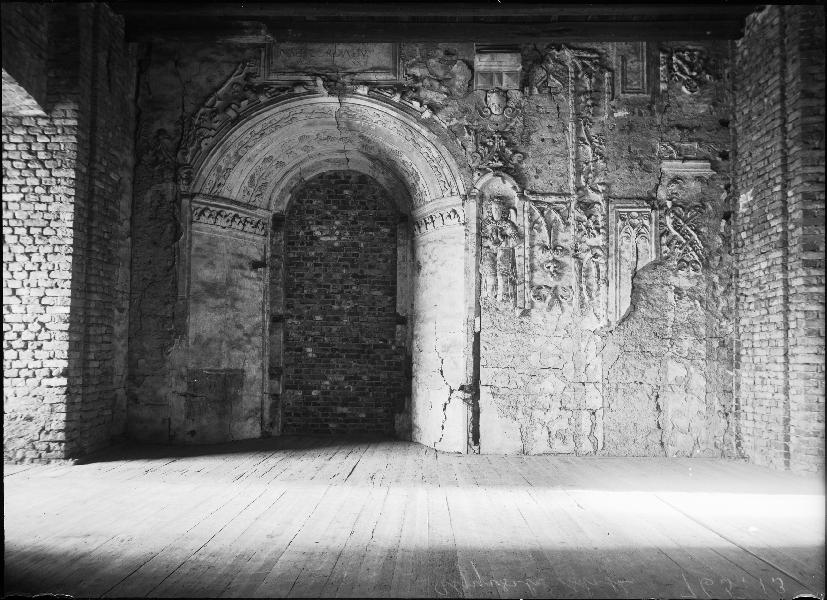
Reredos (dating from the late 1500s) in the castle's former church area, as seen in 1902 before this area of the south wing was remodeled for use as an archive.

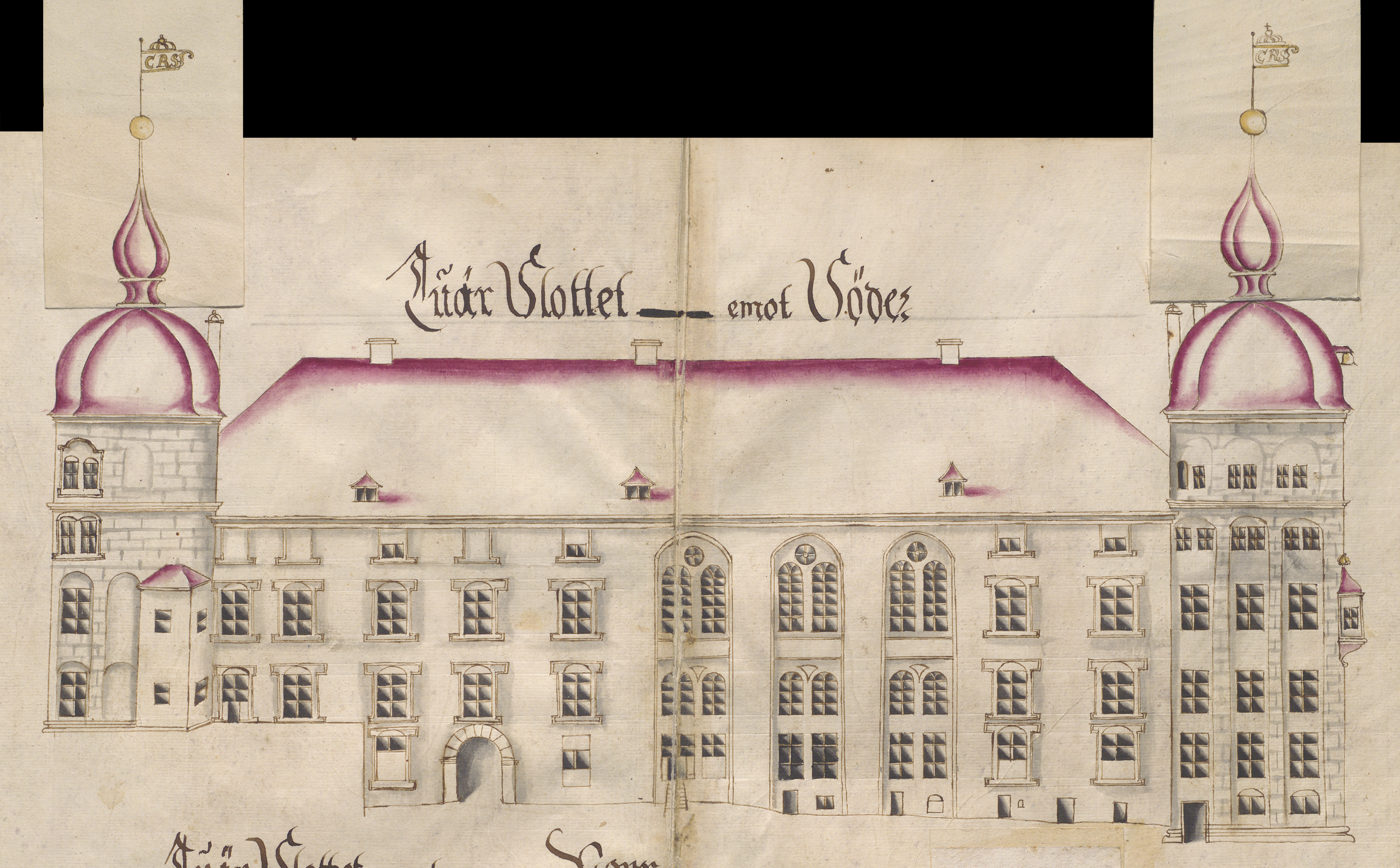
The southern façade of the castle's south wing, circa 1680. "King Jan's Portal," is still a feature of the castle, although the floors above it did not survive the 1702 fire.

In 1572, while John III was king of Sweden, a fire ripped through the castle heavily damaging both the original royal apartments and the representative addition. Franciscus Pahr was hired as architect to rebuild the damaged castle. Pahr envisioned a new south wing to replace the fire-damaged structure, with royal apartments in the western half and a hall of state and church in the eastern half. To the north would be a courtyard, bounded by colonnades and pillars. Pahr died in 1580, with only the western half of the south wing completed. Another architect, possibly Willem Boy, was brought in to finish the eastern half of the south wing. This new architect also planned for a large north wing with towers, connected to the south wing by a long, narrow east wing called "The Long Castle" (Swedish: Långslottet); this new plan would create a U-shaped castle.

And thus, between the two different architects hired by King John III, the new south wing was completed with royal apartments, a hall of state, and church; also included was the rebuilding the southwest tower and construction of a new southeast tower. Two-thirds of the new east wing (The Long Castle) was also completed by the time John III died in 1592. Also during this period, a large garden was laid out at the base of the hill to the east of the castle.

The castle's church constructed during this period included large multi-story stucco reredos encompassing the entire wall behind the altar. Parts of these reredos remain a feature in the castle today.

=== Charles IX of Sweden ===
King Charles IX wished to see the castle's northern and eastern additions completed. Only the east wing (The Long Castle) and it's northeast tower were completed, the envisioned northern wing was never built.

=== Gustavus Adolphus ===
In 1630, King Gustavus Adolphus announced the decision that Sweden would participate in the Thirty Years' War at the castle.

=== Queen Christina ===
In the 1640s, a fountain was added to the castle's courtyard, which was supplied by water pumped from the river Fyris. It was in the castle that the Swedish government announced the abdication of Queen Christina in 1654.

=== 1702 fire and reconstruction ===
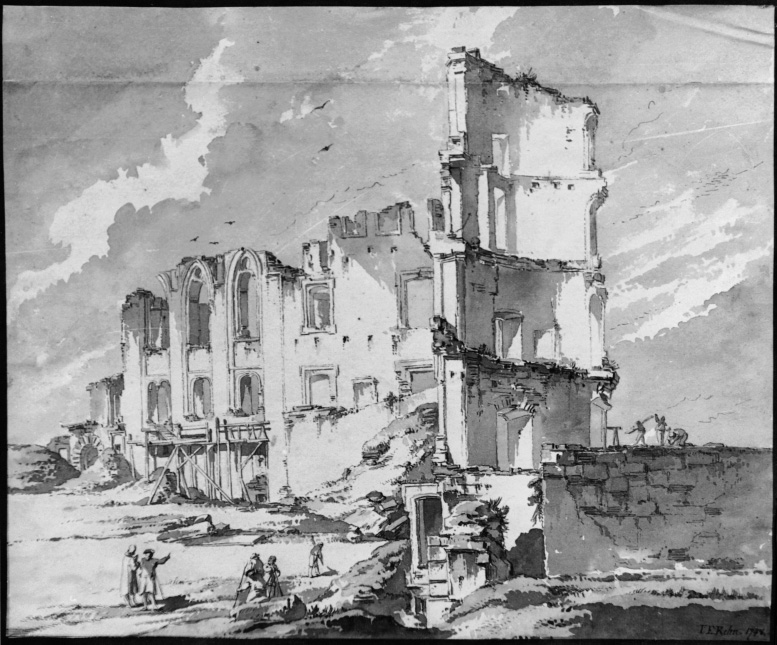
The south wing and southeastern tower following the 1702 fire. The east wing, or "The Long Castle," which was spared major damage is not shown. The three large arched windows indicate the location of the castle's church.

On 16 May 1702 a large fire spread through Uppsala, destroying much of the city. The castle was not spared from the inferno and its south wing was heavily damaged. The castle was not repaired until decades later, in large part because Tre Kronor Castle (the royal palace in Stockholm) had burned just five years prior and resources went towards rebuilding the royal residence there first. Some stone from the damaged Uppsala Castle was taken to Stockholm to be used in the construction of the new Stockholm Palace.

Repairs and rebuilding of Uppsala Castle took place between 1743 and 1762. The repairs were initiated by Duke Adolf Frederick, who in 1743 had been elected heir to the throne of Sweden and needed a proper residence. Carl Hårleman was commissioned architect of the project. The western part of the south wing (above King Jan's Portal), which had contained the royal apartments was not rebuilt. The less damaged eastern part of the south wing, which had contained the hall of state and church, was less damaged and was repaired during this period. The multi-story former church area was divided into different floors and rooms, to be used as royal apartments. The church's stucco reredos that survived the fire were left in place and are still a feature of the castle. Hårleman's plans were only partially realized, as in 1751 Adolf Frederick was crowned king and moved into Drottningholm Palace. Over the course of several centuries, Uppsala had slowly lost its status as a royal city in favor of Stockholm, and the lack of royal funds after 1762 generally left the castle at its current size and shape. A major exception is the southeast tower, which had only been reconstructed to a height of two floors during Hårleman's period–it was fully reconstructed in 1815 to be used as a county prison.

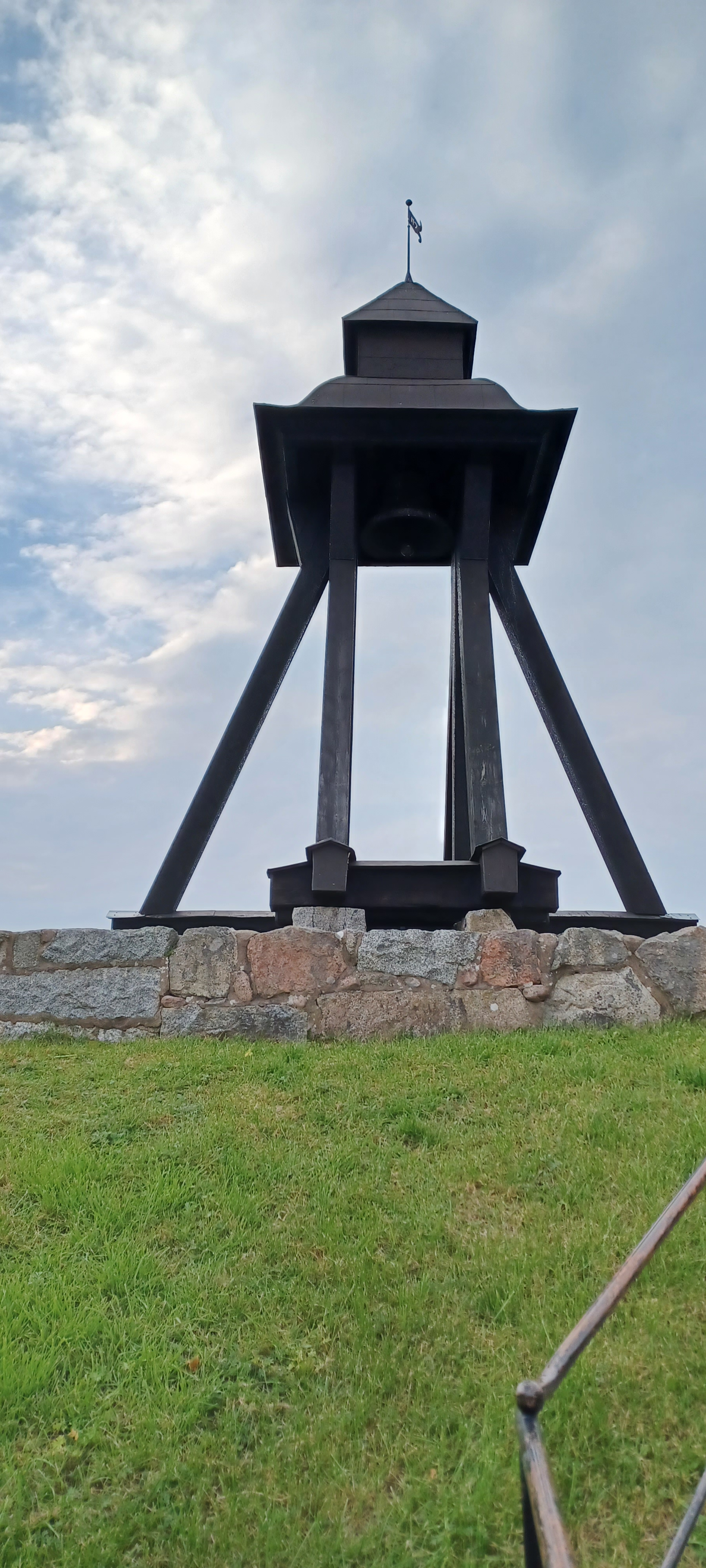
Gunilla Bell Uppsala looking upwards towards the gun battery area.

The Gunilla bell was cast in 1588 and recast in 1759 after the fire. It was moved from the south east tower after the fire to its present position on the battlements of the Bishopcontroller (Styrbiskop) gun battery pointed by Gustav Vasa at the cathedral opposite. The bell then served as a curfew bell for the town.

== Modern usage ==
=== Uppsala County administration ===
After repairs, Uppsala Castle was the administrative center of Uppsala County and the site of the Hall of State (Swedish: Rikssalen) for many years. In the 1930s, the Hall of State was restored and is now used as event space. The castle currently serves as the official residence of the County Governor of Uppsala County.

Dag Hammarskjöld, former Secretary-General of the United Nations, spent his childhood days in the castle when his father, Hjalmar Hammarskjöld, was governor of Uppsala County.

=== Regional archive ===
In 1903, the government of Sweden opened a regional archive in the castle, containing important historical and genealogical records for Uppsala and surrounding counties. The archives were housed in the south wing of the castle, in the area of the former castle church. The reredos that had survived the 1702 fire were visible in parts of the archive. In 1993, the archive was moved out of the castle.

=== Museums ===
==== Uppsala Art Museum ====
Today, the castle's south wing contains the Uppsala Art Museum (Swedish: Uppsala konstmuseum). The art museum opened in 1995, a few years after the regional archive had been removed. As of 2021, Uppsala Municipality is planning major changes to the south wing to better accommodate the art museum.

Beginning in 1997 the art museum also displayed Uppsala University's art study collection (Swedish: Uppsala universitets konststudiesamling) containing many historic Swedish paintings. The art study collection was removed in Spring 2017, to be displayed at the university's Gustavianum museum.

==== Vasaborgen ====
Vasaborgen ("The Vasa Fortress") is a museum in the ruins of the original foundation of the 1549 royal apartments. The museum opened in 2004, replacing an older, government operated museum which interpreted the history of the castle. It is open for limited hours only during the summer season.

==== Peace Museum ====
Between 2006 and 2019 the Peace Museum (Swedish: Fredsmuseum) was housed in the castle. It closed following the December 2019 discovery of high levels of radon in the castle.

==== Uppsala Castle Museum ====
On 17 May 2025, the Uppsala Castle Museum (Swedish: Uppsala slottshistoriska) was opened in the structure. The museum's primary exhibit is titled "Castle Life," which interprets the history of the castle, and those who lived and worked in it, from the 1500s to the present.

=== Businesses ===
Areas of the castle are also rented to private businesses.
