= Elsa Eschelsson =

Swedish academic

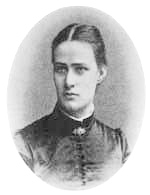
Elsa Eschelsson.

Elsa Olava Kristina Eschelsson (11 November 1861 – 10 March 1911) was the first woman to finish a Doctor of Laws (juris utriusque doctor) degree and the first to attain the academic position of docent at a Swedish university, but was denied the right to even serve as acting professor because of her sex. She died in 1911 from an overdose of sleeping-powder.

== Life ==
Elsa Eschelsson was born in Norrköping. As most of the earliest generation of women to study at Swedish universities, she came from a well-to-do bourgeois background, daughter of Anders Olof Eschelsson, the owner of a soap factory who also served as Prussian consul in Norrköping. Elsa's mother Carolina Lovisa Ulrika Frestadius was her husband's cousin and daughter of a prominent Stockholm industrialist, A. W. Frestadius.

After his wife's death, A. O. Eschelsson settled in Stockholm with his four daughters. At the age of fourteen Elsa lost her father as well and moved in with an older sister, the young dowager countess Anna Piper. Her oldest sister, Ida, was married to Johan Vilhelm Hagströmer, a law professor at Uppsala university. Elsa finished her "studentexamen", the final examination from secondary school, in 1882 and came to Uppsala as a student. She began with a fil. kand. degree in history which she completed in 1885. After graduating, she went on a long journey through Europe and the Middle East, but returned to Uppsala and her studies in the fall. She had shown an early interest in studying Law and after her return she began her law studies, encouraged by her brother-in-law Hagströmer. She received her juris utriusque licentiat and juris utriusque doctor degrees in 1897 and was appointed a docent of civil law at the university.

Eschelsson lectured in process law at the university 1897-1899, taught the so-called propaedeutic course in civil law from 1904 and held appointment to examine students taking the civilexamen (a lower law degree qualifying for some civil servant positions). As a woman pioneer in her field, she had supporters in the Faculty of Law, including Ernst Trygger and her brother-in-law Hagströmer, but also encountered problems; because of her sex, she would not have been allowed to hold an ordinary professorship - this was changed only in 1925 - and, despite the recommendation of the faculty, she was denied even acting as professor in 1898. She had the support of most of the professors in the Law Faculty but was brutally persecuted by civil law professor Alfred Ossian Winroth (1852-1914), who had come from Lund in 1899, until he moved to a professorship at the University in Stockholm in 1907.

She has been described both as shy and ambitious, and as a sensitive person with many highs and lows who kept a formal and distanced relationship to the other women at the university and avoided participating in many of their social activities. She died March 10, 1911, in Uppsala from an overdose of sleeping-powder in what has often been assumed to be suicide. In accordance with her wishes, her papers were destroyed after her death. In her will, she left 60,000 crowns to a scholarship fund for female law students. A memorial volume dedicated to her was published in 1929. In 1997, at the occasion of the 100th anniversary of her disputation for the Doctor of Laws degree, a volume of the yearbook De Lege, was published under the title Elsa Eschelsson: Ad studium et ad laborem incitavit, including a biographical study of Eschelsson by Gunilla Strömholm and other papers by female jurists at the Uppsala Faculty of Law. Since that year, the Faculty of Law has celebrated an "Elsa Eschelsson Day" with a symposium on gender issues every year on May 31.

== Publications ==
- Om begreppet gåfva enligt svensk rätt (1897)
- "Om civiläktenskapets framträdande i svensk och utländsk rätt" (in I vår tids lifsfrågor, XXXI, 1903),
- Bidrag till läran om besittning enligt svensk rätt. Besittningsbegreppet (1904),
- Om fullbordandet af gåfva af lös egendom enligt svensk rättspraxis (1906)
- Ännu några ord om fullbordandet af gåfva af lös egendom enligt svensk rättspraxis. En replik (1907).
- Om skuldebref enligt svensk rätt (1912), edited by L. Rabenius

== See also ==
- First women lawyers around the world
