= Royal Academic Orchestra =

The Royal Academic Orchestra (Swedish: Kungliga Akademiska Kapellet) is Uppsala University’s symphony orchestra. Both the University and its orchestra are deeply rooted in history. Uppsala University, established in 1477, is the oldest in the Nordic countries, and its orchestra, which is mentioned in extant sources for the first time in 1627, is among the oldest in Europe. The orchestra was established by King Gustavus Adolphus of Sweden. From the beginning it was predominantly a vocal ensemble, but with the advent of new Baroque stylistic ideals this chorus was gradually turned into a purely instrumental ensemble under the leadership of the University’s director musices. Its duties were primarily to provide music at academic festivities, such as conferment ceremonies and inaugurations of vice-chancellors, but also on religious and national holidays.

In the rich musical life that emerged in the 19th century, the Royal Academic Orchestra was frequently heard, in public concerts with the University’s newly established choirs, and it developed into a more and more consummate symphony orchestra. In recent centuries the position as director musices has been held by some of Sweden’s foremost composers, including Johann Christian Friedrich Haeffner, Hugo Alfvén, and Lars Erik Larsson. Since 2000 the orchestra has been directed by Stefan Karpe.
