= University Hall (Uppsala University) =

University building in Uppsala, Sweden

- Universitetshuset
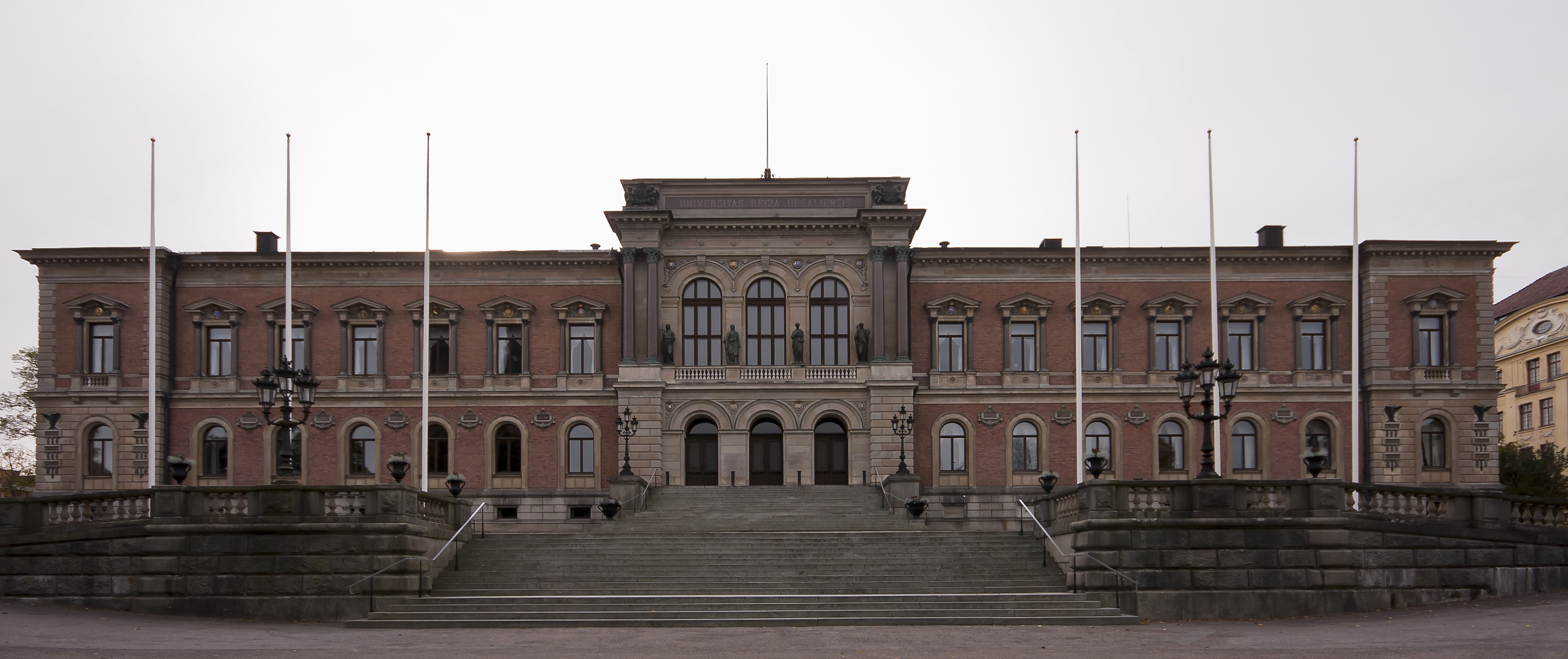

General information
- Coordinates: 59.857558°N 17.629444°E
- Completed: 1887

Design and construction
- Architect: Herman Teodor Holmgren

University Hall or the University Main Building (Swedish: Universitetshuset) is the main building of Uppsala University in Uppsala, Sweden. The building is situated in University Park close to Uppsala Cathedral. It was designed in Italian Renaissance Beaux-Arts style by architect Herman Teodor Holmgren (1842–1914) and completed in 1887.

The building should not be confused with Carolina Rediviva, which is the Uppsala University Library building, or Gustavianum, the previous main building, which today is a museum.

== History ==
Before the completion of the present building, the main lecture hall of the university had been housed in the nearby Gustavianum, while the administration was housed in the Consistory House (Konsistoriehuset) and the academic ceremonies took place in the Carolina Rediviva university library building. The chosen site for the new building was previously occupied by a riding exercise court belonging to the university. Planning and construction took place during a 10-year period, with the winning proposal designed by Herman Teodor Holmgren, a student of Fredrik Wilhelm Scholander. Holmgren had studied Beaux-Arts architecture in France, Italy and Germany and the university building became the largest of his works and the most well-known, counting among the foremost examples of this architectural style in Sweden and Scandinavia. The building contract was awarded to the C H Hallström building company.

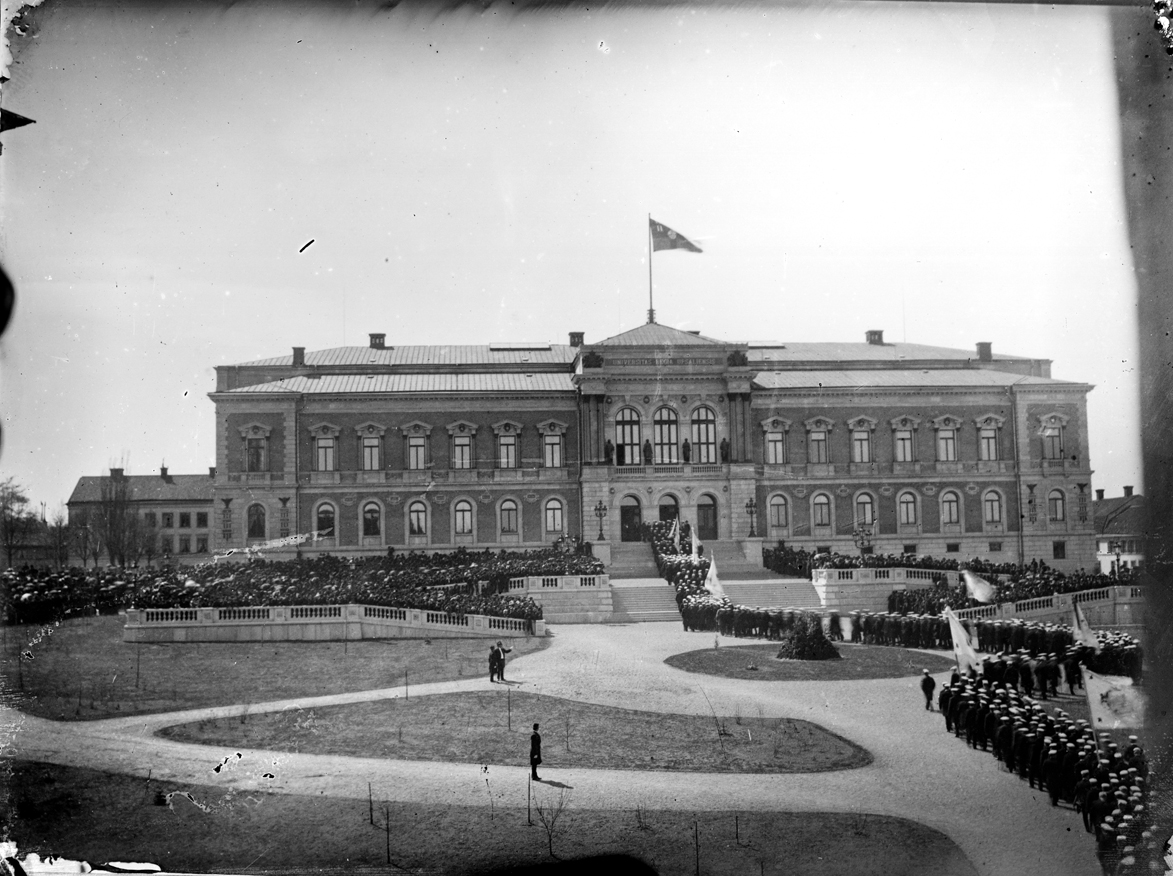
Inauguration ceremony in 1887

During the excavations for the building and the University Park, remnants of the foundations for the 14th-century Archbishop's Castle were unearthed, but subsequently buried below the park. Budget problems and the problematic ground conditions, due to the steep incline and castle foundations, caused delays and redesigns during the construction period. The building was finally inaugurated by King Oscar II in May 1887.

The new building brought many advantages to the university, as the previous building Gustavianum only had two unheated lecture rooms. Several of the University Hall lecture rooms are still in use today, notably the Grand Auditorium, which seats 1,800 people. The inscription above the entrance to the main auditorium is an aphorism by the Swedish 18th-century philosopher Thomas Thorild (1759–1808), which famously reads:

Tänka fritt är stort
men tänka rätt är större

("It is a great thing to think freely,
but greater still to think correctly")

Between 1996 and 2001, the building underwent a major renovation during which the paintwork in the entrance hall was restored to the original 19th century colors, which had been painted over during the 1970s.

== Present use ==
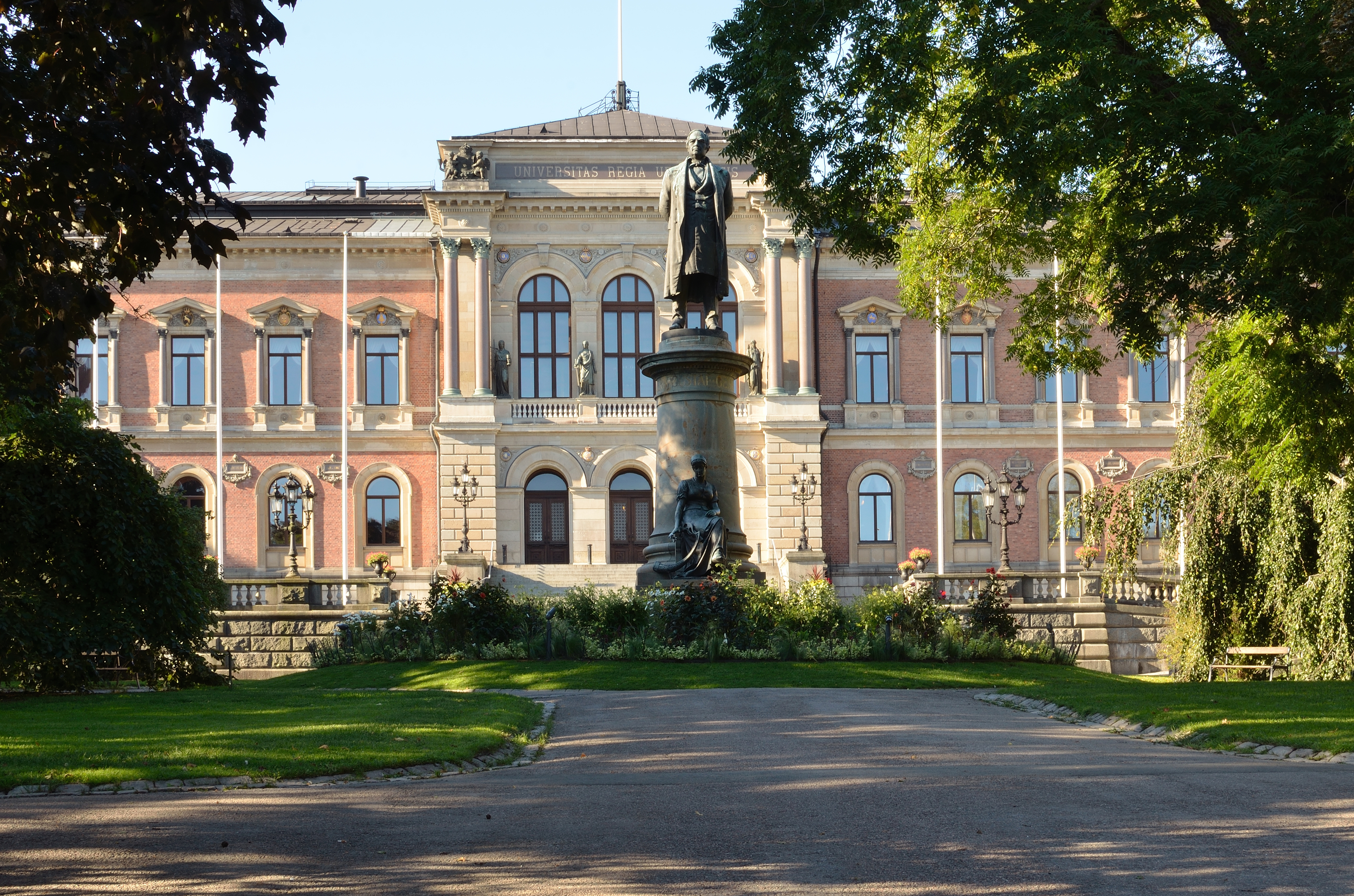
Exterior

Today, the University Hall is mainly used for lectures, conferences, concerts and ceremonies, as well as formal receptions and consistory meetings. Many of the original administrative and academic functions of the building have been moved to modern buildings since the 19th century as the university has grown, but the University Hall retains its status as the formal main building. The building also houses a significant part of Uppsala University's extensive art collection and the Uppsala University Coin Cabinet.

As the building is still in use by the university, some of the rooms are normally inaccessible to the general public. Formal receptions for guests of the rector magnificus, the Vice-Chancellor, are held in the Chancellor's room upstairs, and the adjoining suite of rooms is used by the four original faculties of Uppsala University, decorated with portraits of past professors and alumni of Uppsala University. It also contains a minor exhibit on the university's Nobel laureates. The Consistory, the governing body of the university, meets in an ornate board room on the entrance level, which is decorated with portraits of previous monarchs of Sweden from the Protestant reformation to the 20th century.

== Gallery ==
Interior

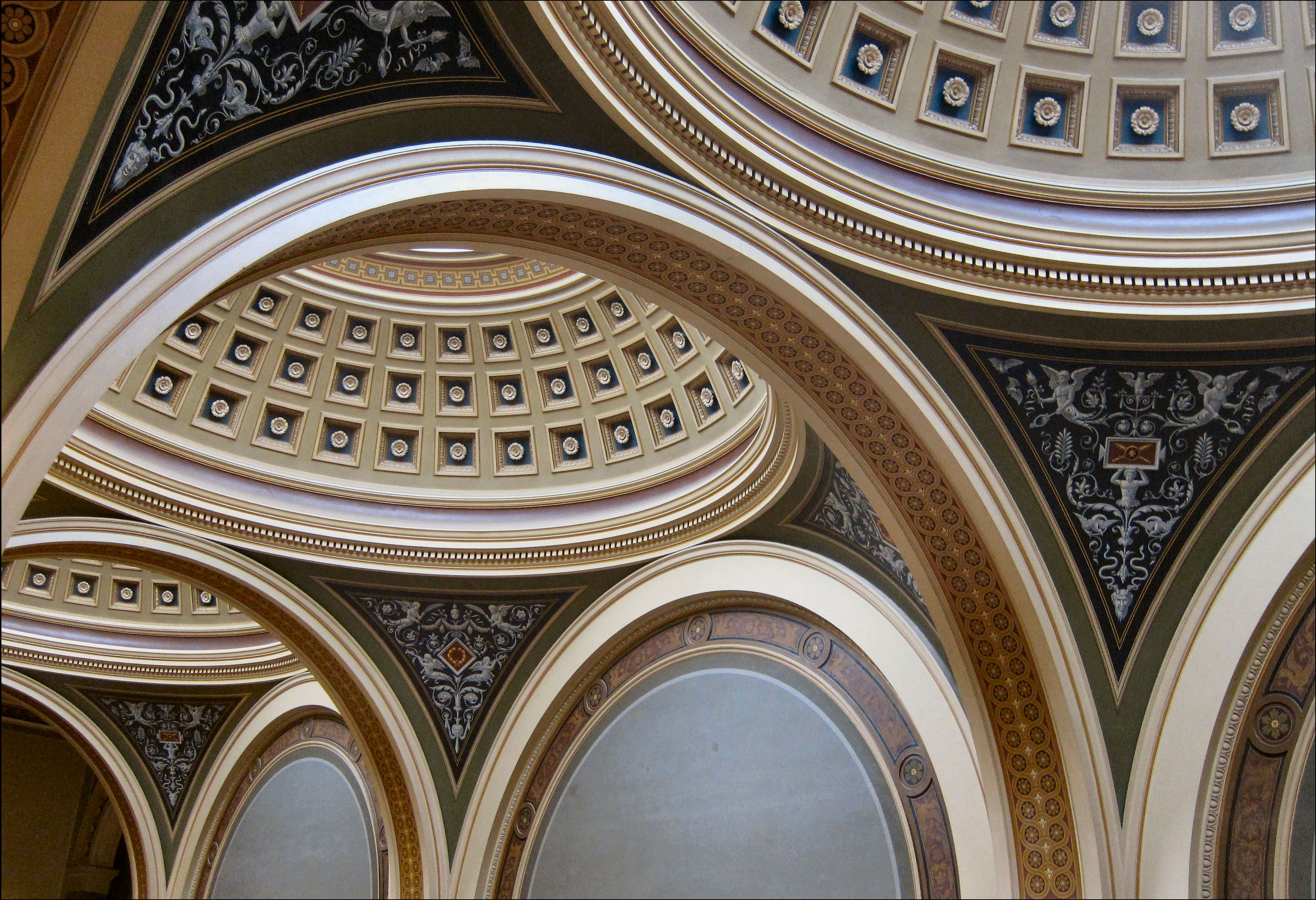
Vault detail

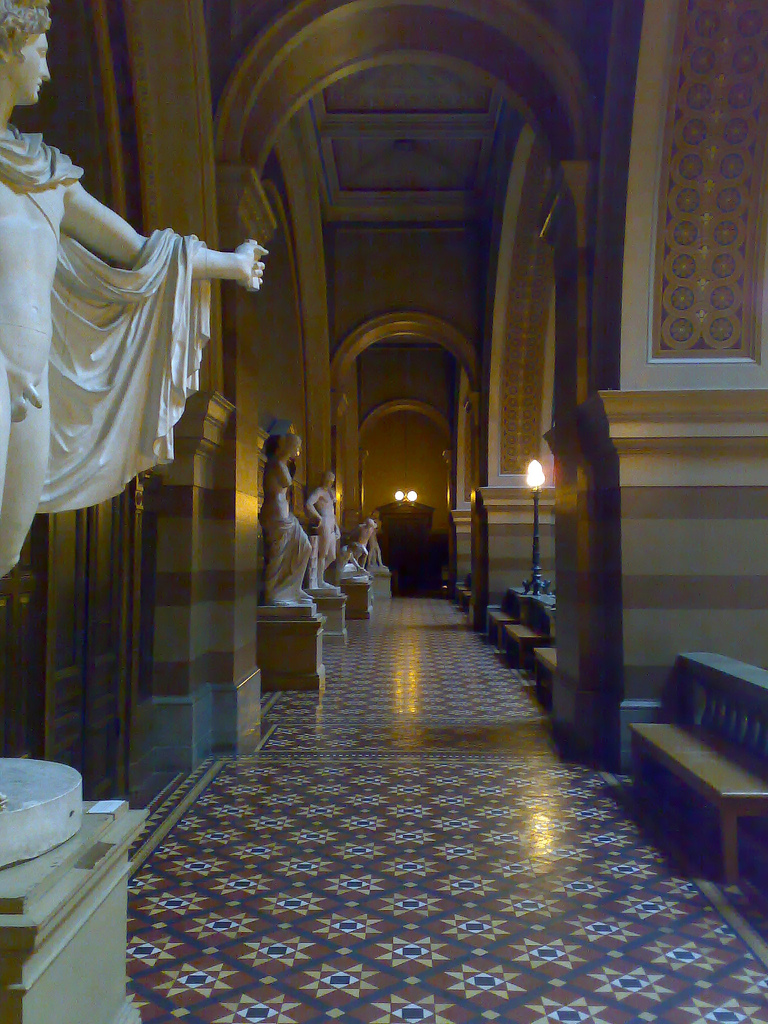
Sculpture gallery

Entrance to the main auditorium with inscription

The dome inside the main auditorium

== See also ==
- Uppsala University
- Gustavianum
- Carolina Rediviva

== Literature ==
- Heinemann, Thomas (1987). Universitetshuset i Uppsala 1887-1987 : en jubileumsbok. Uppsala, Almqvist & Wiksell International. ISBN 9789150606089
