= Uppsala University =

Research university in Sweden

Coordinates: 59°51′27″N 17°37′44″E

- Uppsala universitet
- Latin: Universitas Regia Upsaliensis
- Motto: Gratiae veritas naturae (Latin)
- Motto in English: Truth through Grace and nature
- Type: Public research university
- Established: 1477 (549 years ago)
- Affiliations: Coimbra Group; EUA; Matariki Network of Universities; Guild of European Research-Intensive Universities
- Budget: SEK 7.398 billion
- Rector magnificus: Anders Hagfeldt
- Academic staff: 4,135 FTE
- Administrative staff: 2,150 FTE
- Students: 52,241 (28,289 FTE)
- Doctoral students: 2,228
- Location: Uppsala, Sweden
- Campus: Urban / University town
- Colours: Maroon, white
- Website: uu.se/en

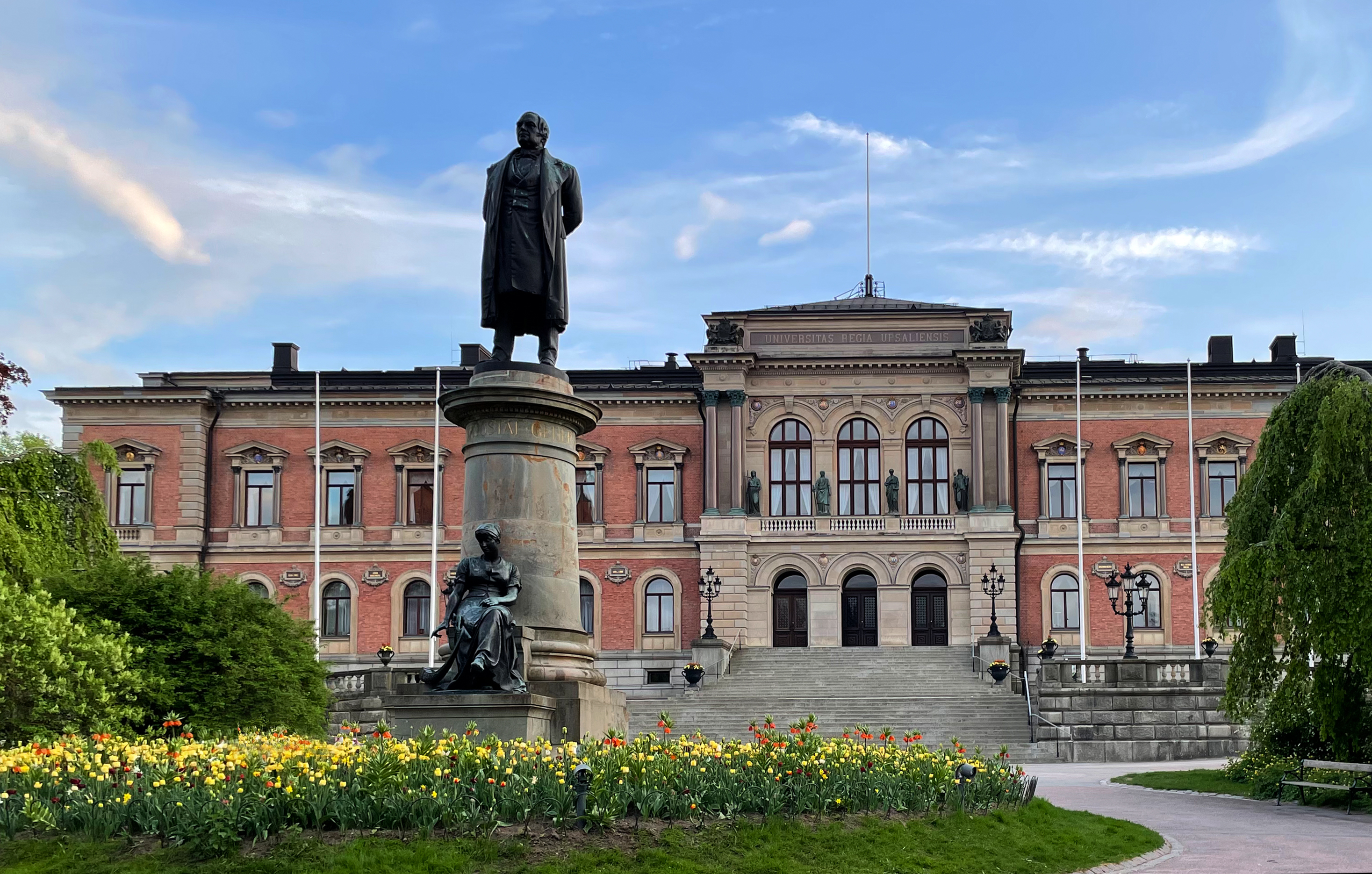
University Hall

Uppsala University (UU) (Swedish: Uppsala universitet) is a public research university in Uppsala, Sweden. Founded in 1477, it is the oldest university in Sweden and the Nordic countries.

The university rose to significance during the rise of Sweden as a great power at the end of the 16th century and was then given relative financial stability with a large donation from King Gustavus Adolphus in the early 17th century. Uppsala also has an important historical place in Swedish national culture, and identity for the Swedish establishment: in historiography, religion, literature, politics, and music. Many aspects of Swedish academic culture in general, such as the white student cap, originated in Uppsala. It shares some peculiarities, such as the student nation system, with Lund University and the University of Helsinki.

Uppsala belongs to the Coimbra Group of European universities and to the Guild of European Research-Intensive Universities.

The university has nine faculties distributed over three disciplinary domains: Humanities and Social Sciences, Medicine and Pharmacy, and Science and Technology. As of 2020, it had approximately 52,000 registered students at the undergraduate and postgraduate levels and 2,200 PhD students.

Architecturally, Uppsala University has traditionally had a strong presence in Fjärdingen, the neighbourhood around the cathedral on the western side of the river Fyris. Despite some contemporary building developments further away from the centre, Uppsala's historic centre continues to be dominated by the presence of the university.

== History ==
=== 15th century: Origins ===
As with most medieval universities, Uppsala University initially grew out of an ecclesiastical centre. The archbishop of Uppsala had been one of the most important sees in Sweden proper since Christianity first spread to this region in the ninth century. Uppsala had also long been a hub for regional trade and had contained settlements dating back into the deep Middle Ages. As was also the case with most medieval universities, Uppsala had initially been chartered through a papal bull. Uppsala's bull, which granted the university its corporate rights, was issued by Pope Sixtus IV in 1477 and established several provisions. Among the most important of these was that the university was officially given the same freedoms and privileges as the University of Bologna. This included the right to establish the four traditional faculties of theology, law (Canon Law and Roman law), medicine, and philosophy, and to award the bachelor's, master's, licentiate, and doctoral degrees. The archbishop of Uppsala was also named as the university's chancellor and was charged with maintaining the rights and privileges of the university and its members. Lectures began on 7 October.

=== 16th century: Turbulent times ===
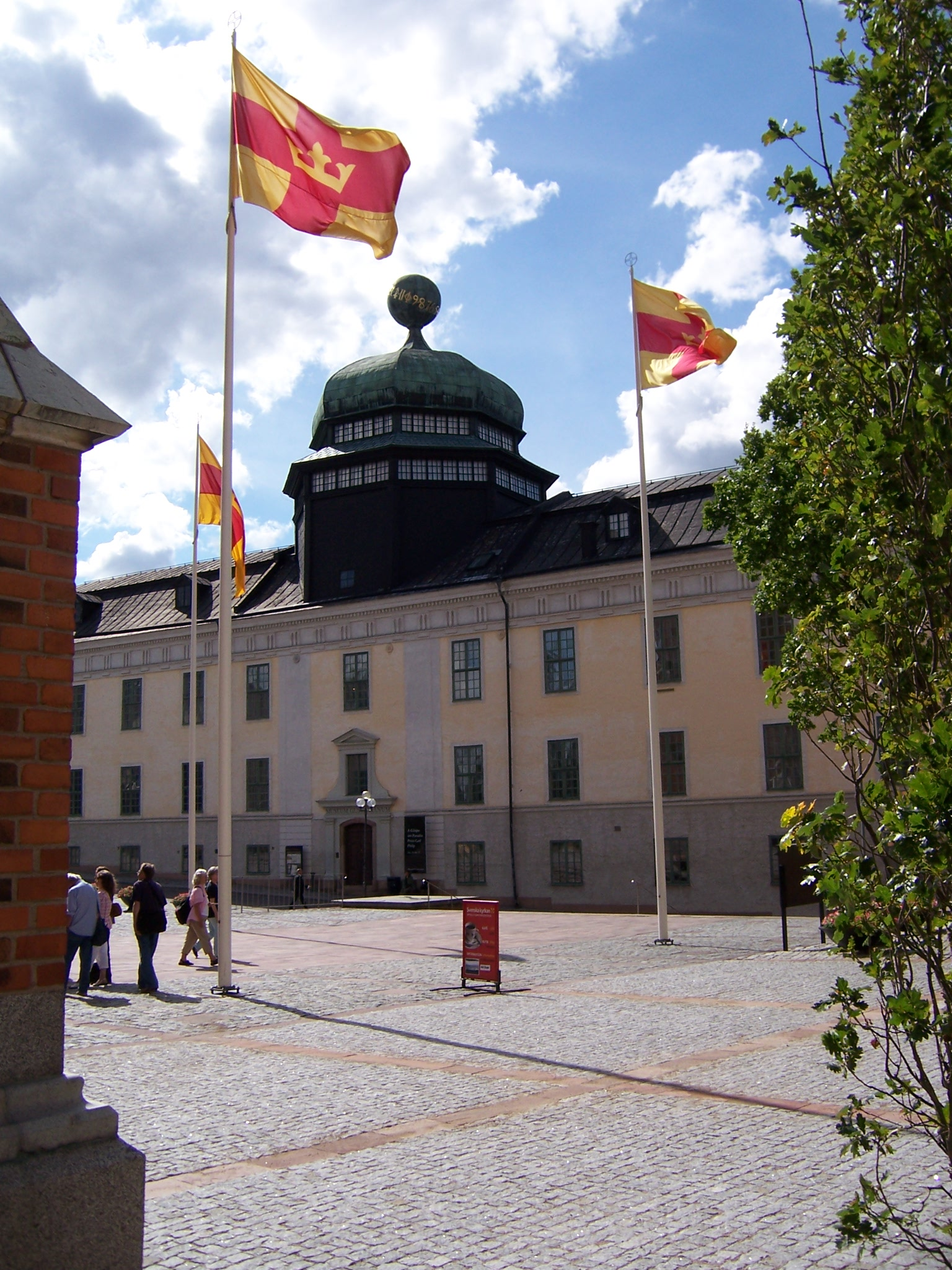
Gustavianum, built 1622–1625 and now a museum.

The turbulent period of the reformation of King Gustavus Vasa resulted in a drop in the already relatively insignificant number of students in Uppsala, which was seen as a centre of Catholicism and potential disloyalty to the Crown. Swedish students generally travelled to one of the Protestant universities in Germany, especially Wittenberg. There is some evidence of academic studies in Uppsala during the 16th century; the Faculty of Theology is mentioned in a document from 1526, King Eric XIV appointed Laurentius Petri Gothus (later archbishop) rector of the university in 1566, and his successor and brother John III appointed several professors in the period 1569–1574. At the end of the century, the situation had changed, and Uppsala became a bastion of Lutheranism, which Duke Charles, the third of the sons of Gustavus Vasa to eventually become king (as Charles IX) used to consolidate his power and eventually oust his nephew Sigismund III Vasa from the throne. The Uppsala Synod in 1593 established Lutheran orthodoxy in Sweden, and Charles and the Council of state gave new privileges to the university on 1 August of the same year.

Theology still had precedence, but in the privileges of 1593, the importance of a university to educate secular servants of the state was also emphasized. Three of the seven professorial chairs which were established were in Theology; of the other four, three were in Astronomy, Physics (or general natural sciences) and Latin eloquence. A fourth chair was given to Ericus Jacobi Skinnerus, who was also appointed rector, but whose discipline was not mentioned in the charter. Of the professors, several were taken over from the Collegium regium Stockolmense in Stockholm, which had been functioning for a few years but closed in 1593. An eighth chair, in Medicine, was established in 1595 but received no appointee for several years. In 1599 the number of students was approximately 150. In 1600 the first post-reformation conferment of degrees took place. In the same year, the antiquarian and mystic Johannes Bureus designed and engraved the seal of the university, which is today used as part of the logotype.

=== 17th century: Expansion ===
The medieval university had mainly been a theology school. The aspirations of the emergent new great power of Sweden demanded a different kind of learning. Sweden both grew through conquests and went through a complete overhaul of its administrative structure. It required a much larger class of civil servants and educators than before. Preparatory schools, gymnasiums, were also founded during this period in various cathedral towns, notably Västerås (the first one) in 1623. Besides Uppsala, new universities were founded in more distant parts of the Swedish Realm, the University of Dorpat (present-day Tartu) in Estonia (1632) and the Royal Academy of Turku in Finland (1640). After the Scanian provinces were taken from Denmark, Lund University was founded in 1666.

Instrumental in the reforms of the early 17th-century Swedish state was the long-dominant Chancellor Axel Oxenstierna, who had spent his own student days in German universities and who for the last years before his death was also chancellor of the university. King Gustavus Adolphus showed the university a keen interest and increased the professorial chairs from eight to thirteen in 1620, and again to seventeen in 1621. In 1624 the king donated "for all eternity" all his own inherited personal property in the provinces of Uppland and Västmanland, some 300 farms, mills and other sources of income. The king's former private tutor, Johan Skytte, who was made chancellor of the university in 1622, donated the Skyttean chair in Eloquence and Government which still exists. The university received a stable structure with its constitution of 1626. The head of the university was to be the chancellor, and his deputy was the "pro-chancellor" (always the archbishop ex officio). The immediate rule was the responsibility of the consistory, to which belonged all the professors of the university, and the rector magnificus, who was elected for a semester at the time; the latter position circulated among the professors, each of whom sometimes held it several times.

During the late 16th and early 17th centuries (and perhaps even earlier), the university was located in the old chapter house parallel to the south side of the cathedral, later renamed the Academia Carolina. In 1622–1625 a new university building was built east of the cathedral, the so-called Gustavianum, named after the reigning king. In the 1630s, the total number of students was about one thousand.

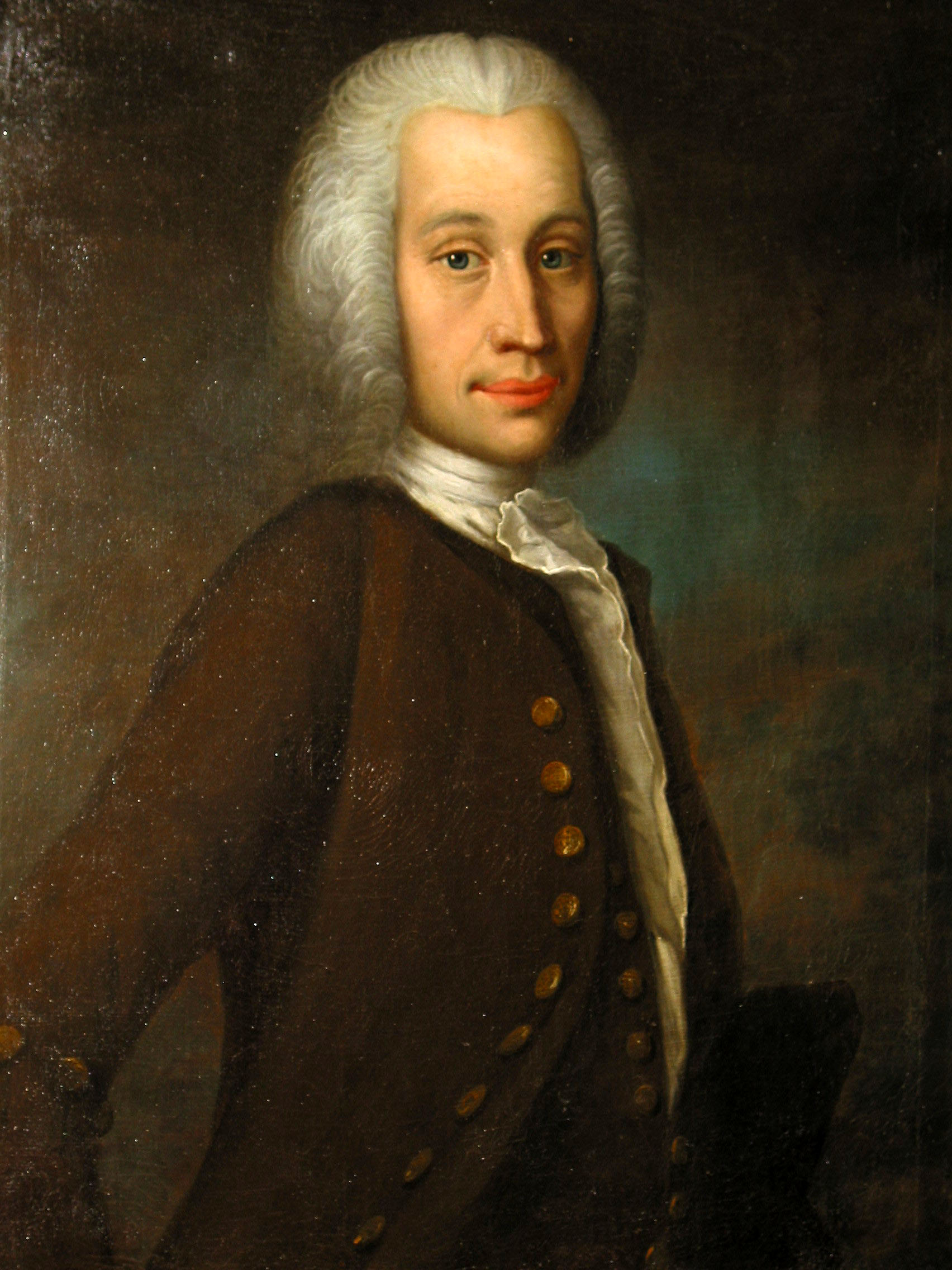
Anders Celsius, astronomer and physicist.

Queen Christina was generous to the university, gave scholarships to Swedish students to study abroad and recruited foreign scholars to Uppsala chairs, among them several from the University of Strasbourg, notably, the philologist Johannes Schefferus (professor Skytteanus), whose little library and museum building at St Eriks torg now belongs to the Royal Society of Sciences in Uppsala. The queen, who would eventually declare her abdication in the great hall of Uppsala Castle, visited the university on many occasions; in 1652 she was present at an anatomical demonstration arranged at the castle for the young physician Olaus Rudbeck. Rudbeck, one of several sons of Johannes Rudbeckius, a former Uppsala professor who became Bishop of Västerås, was sent for a year to the progressive Leiden University in the Netherlands. Returning in 1654, he received an assistantship in Medicine 1655 and had already gone to work on a program for improving aspects of the university. He planted the first botanical garden, the one which would eventually be tended by Carl Linnaeus and is kept today as a museum of 18th-century botany under the name Linnéträdgården ("the Linnaean Garden"). With the patronage of the university chancellor Magnus Gabriel De la Gardie, Rudbeck was made full professor in 1660, was elected rector for two terms, despite his youth, and started a revision of the work of the other professors and a building spree with himself as an architect. His most significant remaining architectural work is the anatomical theatre, which was added to Gustavianum in the 1660s and crowned with the characteristic cupola for which the building is today known.

A gifted scientist, architect and engineer, Rudbeck was the dominant personality of the university in the late 17th century who laid some of the groundwork for Linnaeus and others, but he is perhaps more known today for the pseudohistorical speculations of his Atlantica, which consumed much of his later life. When large parts of Uppsala burned down in 1702, Gustavianum, which contained the university library and its many valuable manuscripts, escaped the fire; local lore has it that the ageing Rudbeck stood on the roof directing the work of fighting the fire.

=== 18th century: Enlightenment and mercantilism ===
The early part of the 18th century was still characterized by the combination of Lutheran orthodoxy and classical philology of the previous century, but eventually, a larger emphasis on sciences and practically useful knowledge developed. The innovative mathematician and physicist Samuel Klingenstierna (1698–1765) was made a professor in 1728, the physicist and astronomer Anders Celsius in 1729, and Carl Linnaeus was made professor of medicine with botany in 1741. The university was not immune to the parliamentary struggle between the parties known as the "Hats" and the "Caps," with the former having a preference for hard sciences and practical knowledge. The Hat government then in power established a chair in economics (Œconomia publica) in 1741 and called Anders Berch as its first incumbent. This was the first professorship in economics outside Germany, and possibly the third in Europe (the first chairs having been established in the Martin Luther University of Halle and European University Viadrina in 1727). In 1759, following a donation, another chair in the economy was established, the Borgströmian professorship in "practical economy," which meant the practical application of the natural sciences for economic purposes (it eventually developed into a chair for physiological botany).

There were very radical attempts at reforms which were never implemented, but important changes took place. University studies had until this time been very informal in their overall organization, with the all-purpose philosophiæ magister-degree being the only one frequently conferred and many never graduating, as there was no degree applicable to their intended area of work (and well-connected aristocratic students often not graduating as they did not need to). A few professional degrees for various purposes were introduced in 1749–1750, but the radical suggestion of binding students to a single program of study adapted to a particular profession was never implemented. The reforms of this era have been compared to those of the 1960s and 1970s (Sten Lindroth).

Although it took some time after the fire of 1702, Uppsala Cathedral and Uppsala Castle were both eventually restored, both by Carl Hårleman, perhaps the most important Swedish architect of the era. He also modified Gustavianum, designed a new conservatory for Linnaeus' botanical garden and built the new Consistory house, which was to be the administrative core of the university.

Another magnificent royal donation was that of the large baroque garden of the castle, given by Gustav III to the university when it was obvious that the old botanical garden was insufficient. A large new conservatory was built by the architect Louis Jean Desprez. Additional grounds adjacent to the baroque garden have since been added. The old garden of Rudbeck and Linnaeus was largely left to decay but was reconstructed in the years between 1918 and 1923 according to the specifications of Linnaeus in his work Hortus Upsaliensis from 1745.

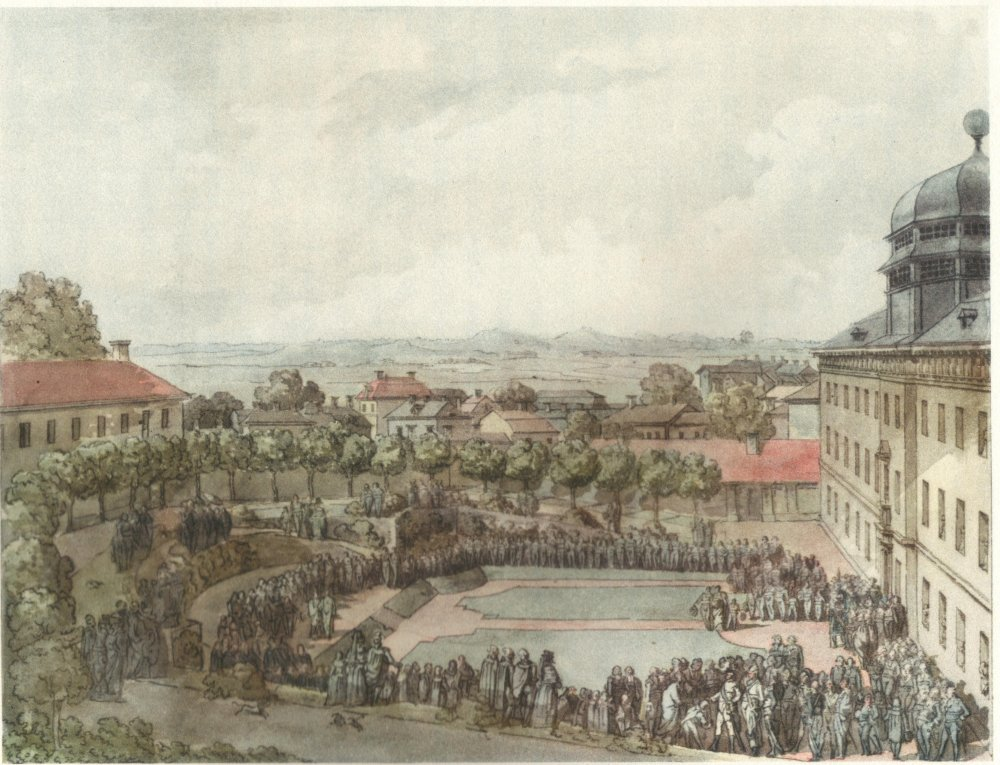
King Gustav III visits the university in 1786

=== Women at the university ===
The issue of women's right to study at universities was raised during the very last session of the estate parliament in 1865 in a motion from Carl Johan Svensén, a member of the farmers' estate. This was preceded by the foundation of the Royal Seminary for women and the progressive transformation of the education at private girls schools to become more and more similar to that of boys. The reception was mixed, with the most negative views coming from the clergy. In the following years, the issue continued to be debated at the universities. The Flickskolekommittén 1866 (Girls' School Committee of 1866) recommended that women be given access to study, considering the fact that not all women could marry and even some educated women should have access to education to be able to support themselves professionally.

In 1870, it was decided to let women take the secondary school examination ("studentexamen") that gave the right to entry at universities and the right to study and complete degrees at the faculties of Medicine in Uppsala and Lund and at the Karolinska Institute in Stockholm. A common view was that female sensitivity and compassion would make women capable of working as physicians, but their right to work was still restricted to private practice. Women's rights to higher education were extended in 1873 when all degrees except those in the faculties of theology and the licentiate degree in Law were made accessible for women.

The first female student in Sweden was Betty Pettersson (1838–1885), who had already worked as a private tutor for several years when she took "studentexamen" in 1871. With a royal dispensation, she was allowed to enter university in Uppsala in 1872, the year before studies at the Philosophical faculty would actually be made generally available to women. She studied modern European languages and was the first woman in Sweden to complete an academic degree when she finished a Bachelor of Arts ("filosofie kandidat") in 1875. She became the first woman to be employed as a teacher in a public school for boys. The first woman in Sweden to complete a doctoral degree was Ellen Fries (1855–1900), who entered Uppsala university in 1877 and became a PhD in history in 1883. Other female students of this period include Lydia Wahlström (1869–1954) who later became a noted educator, activist and writer on women's emancipation and suffrage. Defending a dissertation in history in 1900, she became the second woman to finish a doctorate at a Swedish university. In 1892, she founded the Uppsala Women's Student Association, which set up spex performances and other things enjoyed by male students but from which the women were excluded at the time. The members of the Association were the first woman to wear student caps in public, an important sign of their status. Elsa Eschelsson (1861–1911) was the first Swedish woman to finish a law degree and the first to become a "docent," but was not permitted to even hold the position of acting professor despite being formally qualified for this in everything but her sex. After years of conflicts with the professor of civil law A. O. Winroth, who wrote the paper on "Om tjenstehjonsförhållandet" and with the university board, she died in 1911 from an overdose of sleeping powder.

According to the constitution of 1809, only "native Swedish men" could be appointed to higher civil servant positions, including professorships. This was changed by the Behörighetslagen in 1925, and the first woman to hold a professorial chair at Uppsala University was Gerd Enequist, appointed professor of human geography in 1949.

Hildegard Björck who studied at the university became the first Swedish woman to receive an academic degree.

== Administration and organisation ==
=== Central administration ===
The governing board of the university is the consistory, with representatives of the faculties as well as members representing the students and non-academic employees (three professors and three students), and ten university outsiders appointed by the Swedish government. All these members in the consistory have the right to vote.

The unions active at the university also have three representatives in the consistory; these members have the right to speak but not any right to vote

Since the last reorganization in 1999, the university has had a separate body called the academic senate, which is a wider, but mostly advisory group representing teaching staff/researchers and students. The executive head of the university is the rector magnificus, whose deputy is the prorector. There are (also since 1999) three vice rectors, each heading one of the three "disciplinary domains" (Arts and Social Sciences, Medicine and Pharmacy, and Science and Technology) into which the nine faculties are divided. Each faculty has a faculty board and is headed by a dean (dekanus). The position of dean is held part-time by a professor of the faculty.

=== Faculties ===
Through the division of faculties and the addition of a previously independent school of Pharmacy as a new faculty, the traditional four-faculty organization of European universities has evolved into the present nine faculties. The disciplinary domains and their faculties are as depicted below.

==== Disciplinary Domain of Arts and Social Sciences ====
- Faculty of Arts
- Faculty of Social Sciences
- Faculty of Languages
- Faculty of Theology
- Faculty of Law (Juridiska fakulteten) is the oldest law faculty in the Nordic countries and existed prior to the university's founding in 1477. The activities of the faculty include a wide range of research areas and specializations. This faculty has one department: the Department of Law.
- Faculty of Educational Sciences (formerly the Department of Education, and was raised to the status of a faculty in its own right in 2002)

==== Disciplinary Domain of Medicine and Pharmacy ====
- Faculty of Medicine
- Faculty of Pharmacy, originally an independent "royal institute" in Stockholm, which was moved to Uppsala and incorporated with the university between 1968 and 1972.

==== Disciplinary Domain of Science and Technology ====
- Faculty of Science and Technology: The engineering programs have since 1982 been marketed as the Uppsala School of Engineering (Uppsala Tekniska Högskola). This has however never been a separate institution. Still, only a unit within the Faculty of Science and Technology and the use of the term has been phased out after the Faculty of Mathematics and Natural Sciences was renamed the Faculty of Sciences and Technology in the 1990s.

==== Other ====
Uppsala University also hosts the Forum for South Asia Studies, a collaborative academic effort by its six faculties: Theology, Law, History and Philosophy, Social Sciences, Languages, and Educational Sciences. The Forum aims to facilitate and promote research and education related to the South Asian countries: India, Pakistan, Sri Lanka, Nepal, Bangladesh, Maldives and Afghanistan, on the national and international level, with Ferdinando Sardella, Faculty of Theology, serving as the Forum's director.

=== University Library ===
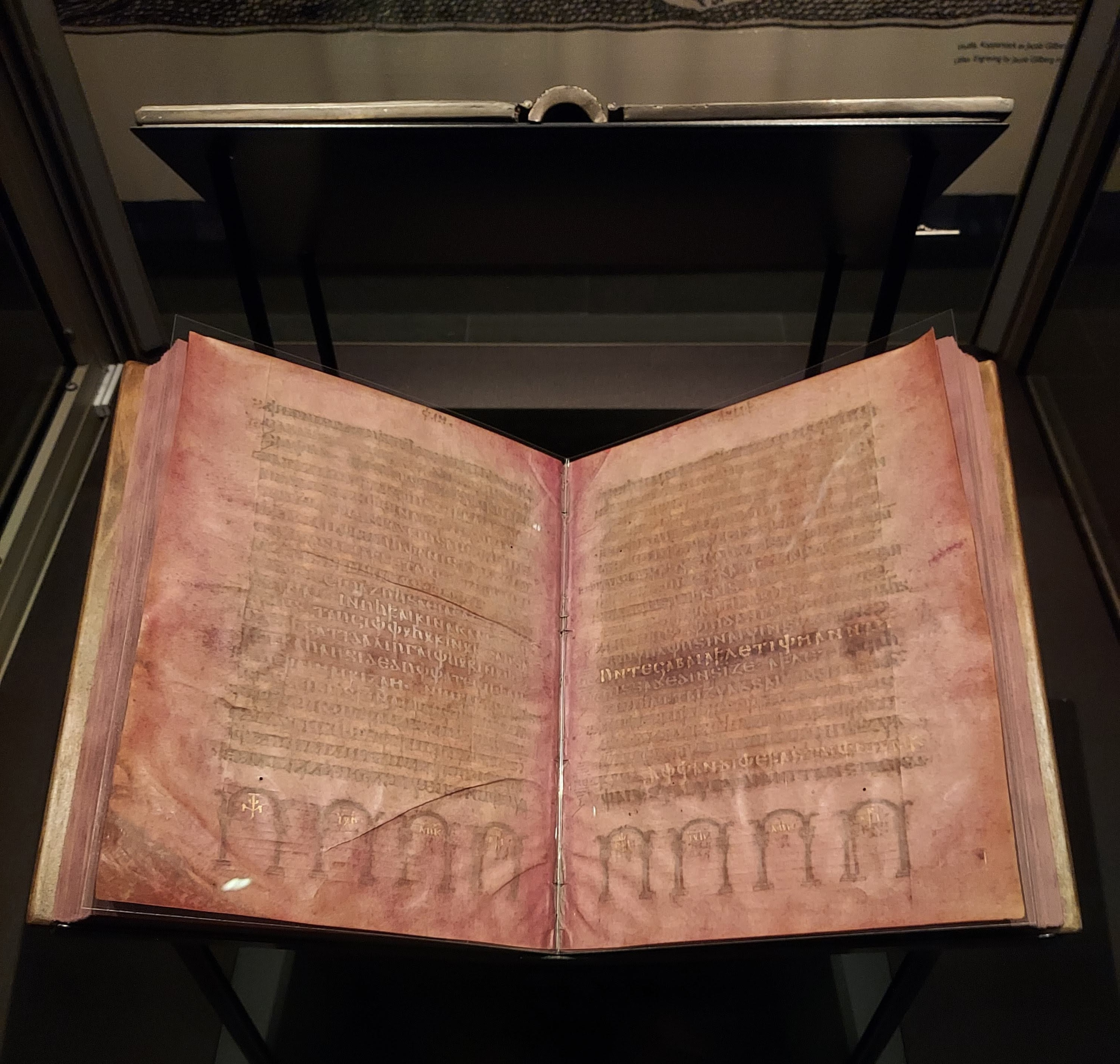
Codex Argentus on display at Uppsala University Library

The university library holds about 5.25 million volumes of books and periodicals (131,293 shelf meters), 61,959 manuscripts, 7,133 music prints, and 345,734 maps and other graphic documents. The holdings of the collection of manuscripts and music include, among other things, the Gothic Bible manuscript Codex Argenteus.

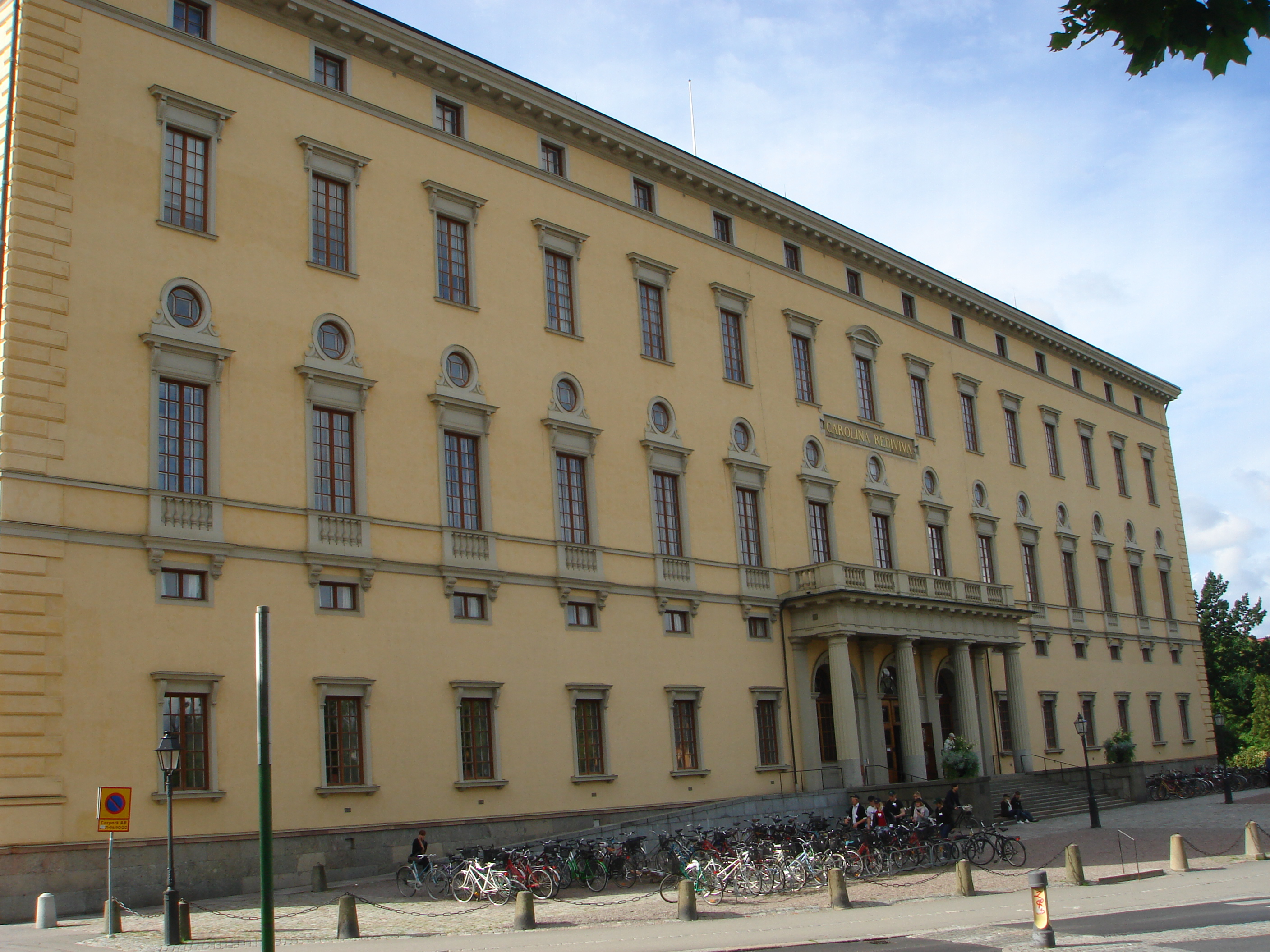
The Carolina Rediviva, the main building of the university library, designed by Carl Fredrik Sundvall and completed in 1841.

The most widely recognized building of the university library is Carolina Rediviva, the "revived Carolina," thus named in reference to Academia Carolina (see illustration), which held the university library from the earliest times until 1691, when it was moved to the upper floor of Gustavianum, where it miraculously survived the great city fire of 1702. In the mid-18th century, there were plans to move it back to Academia Carolina or a new building in the same spot. The building was demolished in 1778 to make place for a new library, but this was never built and the area next to the cathedral where it stood is today a lawn. The present Carolina Rediviva was built in a different place and completed in 1841.

The present university library system comprises 19 branches, including the one in the Carolina building.

=== Uppsala University Hospital ===
The Uppsala Academic Hospital or Akademiska sjukhuset, which functions as a teaching hospital for the Faculty of Medicine and the Nursing School, is run by the Uppsala County Council in cooperation with the university. As of 2003, the hospital had 7,719 employees and as of 2004 1,079 places for patients.

The university hospital is actually older than the university, as it goes back to the earliest hospital, founded in Uppsala in 1302, and much later merged with the university clinic. This was used for 400 years until the great fire of 1702 which destroyed large parts of central Uppsala. A new hospital, which later became the Uppsala county hospital, was built in its place but was moved out of the town in 1811.

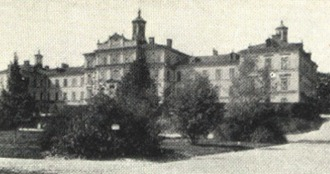
The old main building of the Uppsala University Hospital, photograph from c. 1920

The first clinic with the specific intention to facilitate the practical education of medical students was the Nosocomium Academicum, founded in 1708 and located at the Oxenstierna Palace at Riddartorget beside the cathedral (see illustration above). The building (the former residence of the president of the Royal Chancellery Bengt Gabrielsson Oxenstierna) today houses the Faculty of Law.

The present Akademiska sjukhuset was founded in 1850 as an organizational merger of the county hospital and the university clinic, and a new building was inaugurated in 1867 on the hill below Uppsala Castle to the southeast. From this building, which is still in use, the present hospital complex has grown.

=== The Svedberg Laboratory ===
The Svedberg Laboratory (named after Theodor Svedberg) is a university facility that contains the Gustaf Werner cyclotron, which is used for research as well as for proton therapy for the treatment of cancer with close cooperation with the oncology clinic at Uppsala University Hospital. Such an accelerator and its gantries costs between $60 million and $100 million, and makes Uppsala University Hospital one of the approximately 40 centres in the world to provide such cancer treatment.

== Lecture Series ==
=== At the Department of Philosophy ===
==== Hägerström Lectures ====
The Hägerström Lectures are a yearly series of talks by prominent philosophers hosted by the Department of Philosophy at Uppsala University.

The initiative for the Hägerström Lectures was taken by Stig Kanger, Chair Professor of Theoretical Philosophy at Uppsala University, from 1968 until his death in 1988. The idea was to invite a distinguished philosopher for a week to give a series of five open lectures unified by a common theme, and provide an opportunity for teachers and students at the Department of Philosophy in Uppsala to meet the guest for informal discussions. The series was inaugurated in 1971 and named in honor of the former chair in practical philosophy (1911–1933), Axel Hägerström, the founding father of the Uppsala School of ethics and the jurisprudential movement known as Scandinavian Legal Realism. The Hägerström Lectures were held annually until 2009, biannually between 2009 and 2022, and have been held annually again since 2022. From 2017 onward, the number of lectures each year has been reduced from five to three. The first Hägerström Lecturer was Konrad Marc-Wogau, Kanger's predecessor as Chair in Theoretical Philosophy at Uppsala University (1946–1968). The list of speakers since then includes several of the most eminent and influential philosophers of the last half century in a broad range of areas of specialization, including Julia Annas, Alonzo Church, Donald Davidson, Peter Geach, Ian Hacking, Christine Korsgaard, Saul Kripke, John McDowell, Martha Nussbaum, Hilary Putnam, Judith Jarvis Thomson, Willard Van Orman Quine, Wlodek Rabinowicz, Amartya Sen, Patrick Suppes, Kendall Walton, Timothy Williamson and Georg Henrik von Wright.

== Campus ==
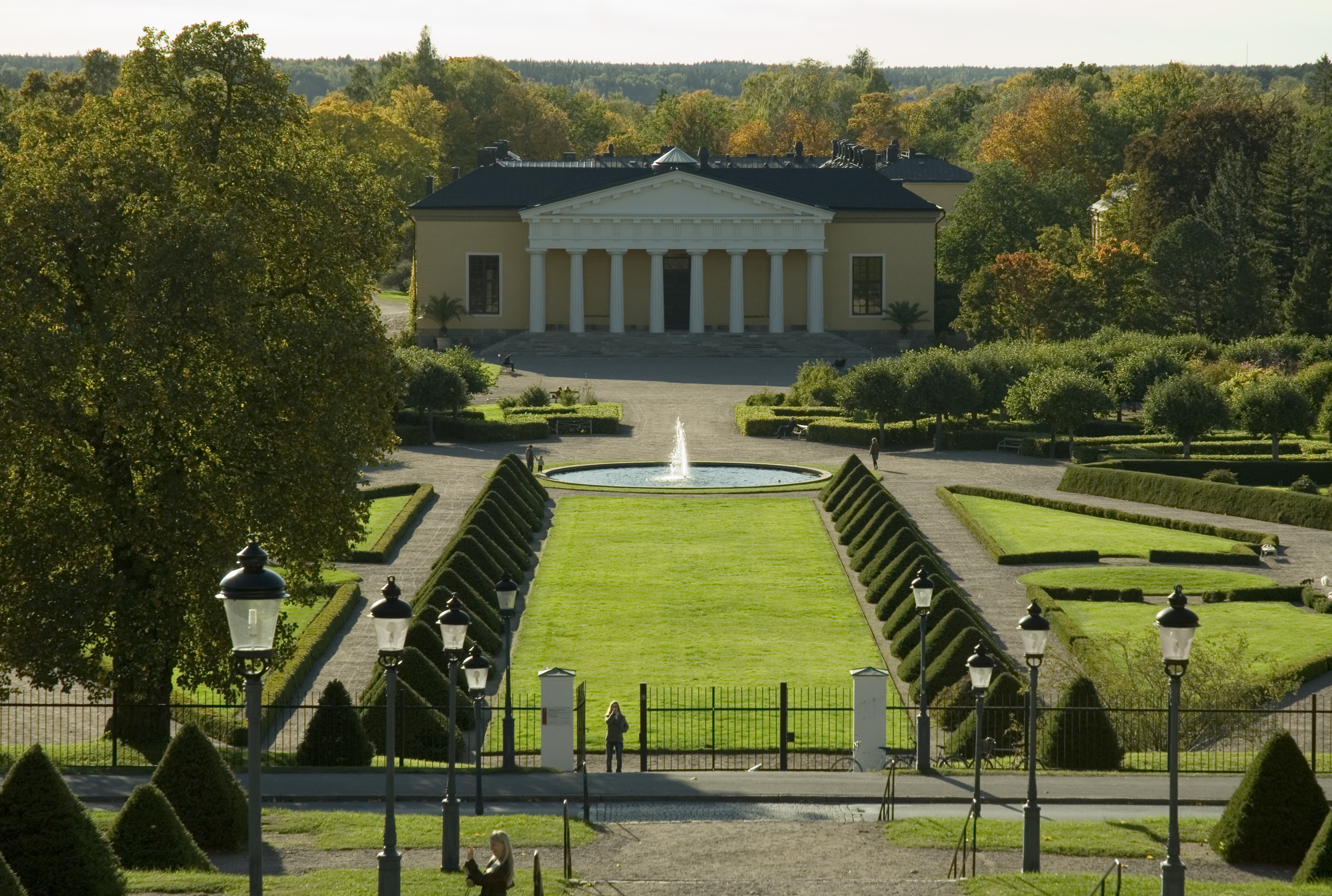
Botanical Garden of Uppsala University

=== University Park and Cathedral area ===
- Gustavianum
- Old Consistory building
- University Hall
- Ekerman House
- The Dean's House (or Julinsköld Palace)
- Skytteanum
- Oxenstierna House (Juridicum – Faculty of Law)
- Regnellianum
- Carolina Rediviva

=== West of central Uppsala ===
- English Park Campus – Centre for the Humanities (including the Centre for Language Studies)
- Centre for Evolutionary Biology (EBC) including the Museum of Evolution
- Botanical Garden
- Segerstedt Building – administrative building
- Blåsenhus – Centre for pedagogy, didactics, educational studies and psychology (former location for pedagogical studies was at Seminariehuset in the north of Uppsala)

=== Other locations in wider central Uppsala ===
- Theatrum Oeconomicum and Gamla Torget ("The Old Forum")
- The Observatory Park with the old observatory
- Ekonomikum
- The Linnaeus Garden
- Anders Celsius's former house and observatory

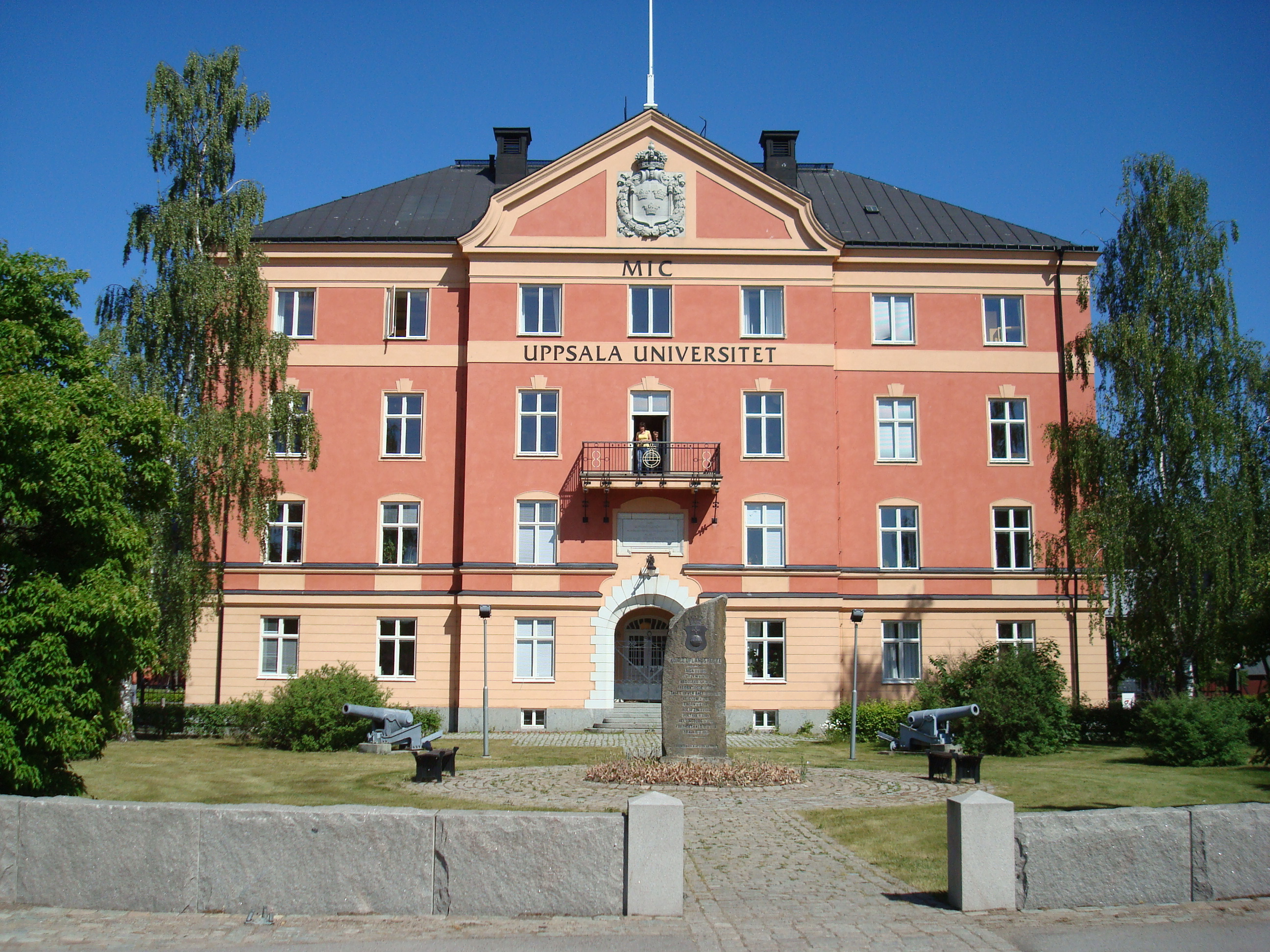
Building at Campus Polacksbacken

=== South of central Uppsala ===
- Uppsala University Hospital
- The Rudbeck Laboratory
- Uppsala Biomedical Centre (BMC)
- Geocentrum
- Information Technology Centre (ITC)
- Ångström Laboratory
- Epidemiology hub (Epihubben)

=== Outside of Uppsala ===
- Campus Gotland

== Student life ==
=== Nations and student union ===
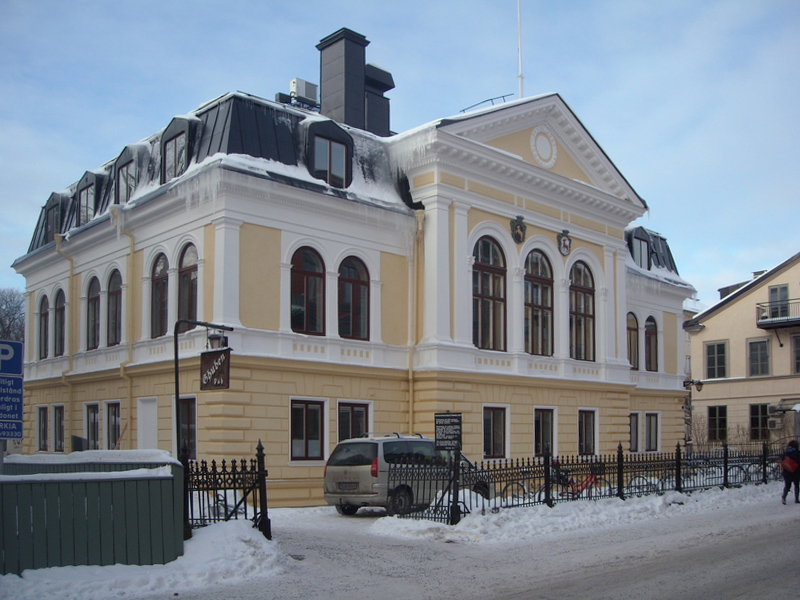
Gästrike-Hälsinge nation

Up until June 2010, students at Uppsala University were obliged to become members of one of the nations, corporations of students traditionally according to the province of origin (not strictly upheld now, for practical reasons). The system of dividing students into nations according to origin can ultimately be traced back to the nations at the medieval University of Paris and other early medieval universities, but the Uppsala nations appear only about 1630–1640, most likely under influence of the Landsmannschaften which existed at some of the German universities visited by Swedish students. In Sweden, nations exist only in Uppsala and Lund. The nations were originally seen as subversive organisations promoting less virtuous aspects of student life, but in 1663 the consistory made membership in a nation legal, each nation being placed under the inspectorship of a professor.

The current thirteen nations all have a history stretching back to the early-to-mid 17th century, but some of them are the result of mergers of older, smaller nations that took place in the early 19th century to facilitate the financing of building projects.

The nations at Uppsala University are:

- Stockholms nation
- Uplands nation
- Gästrike-Hälsinge nation
- Östgöta nation
- Västgöta nation
- Södermanlands-Nerikes nation
- Västmanlands-Dala nation
- Smålands nation
- Göteborgs nation
- Kalmar nation
- Värmlands nation
- Norrlands nation
- Gotlands nation

Since the 1960s there is a fourteenth nation, the Skånelandens nation (referring to the Scanian lands) which has no membership fee and exists as a legal device to get around the compulsory membership for students who prefer not to become affiliated with the traditional nations. However, this nation was made redundant in 2010, when membership in a nation ceased to be mandatory.

The Uppsala Student Union was founded in 1849 as a corporation representing all students, irrespective of nation. The pharmaceutical institute became integrated in Uppsala university during 1968 and formed the Faculty of Pharmacy at Uppsala University, and the pharmaceutical educations moved to Uppsala university during 1972. At the same time, the Pharmaceutical Student Union (Pharmaceutical Association of Uppsala Students) became a Student Union at Uppsala University. The students at the faculty of Pharmacy were also exempt from compulsory membership in the nations, but most pharmacy students belonged to one. However, they were obliged to take up membership in the Pharmaceutical Student Union, an organisation having the same role as the nations and Uppsala Student union at the rest of the university.

The compulsory membership in a student union was abolished on 1 July 2010; however, the unions will still be representing organisations in the university boards and committees. The status as a student union will be decided upon by the university board for periods of three years at a time. On 20 February 2013, the university board decided that there will be four student unions at the university from July 2013 – June 2016: the Uppsala Student Union (for students at the faculties of Art, Social Sciences, Languages, Theology, Law, Educational Sciences and Medicine), the Pharmaceutical Student Union (for students at the Faculty of Pharmacy), the Uppsala Union of Engineering and Science Students (at the Faculty of Science and Technology), and Rindi (the union for students at Campus Gotland). In February 2016, two additional associations were given the status as student unions: Uppsala Business & Economics Students Association (for students of economics) and Uppsala Law Student Associations (for students of law). Thus, there are now six student unions at Uppsala university.

=== Music ===
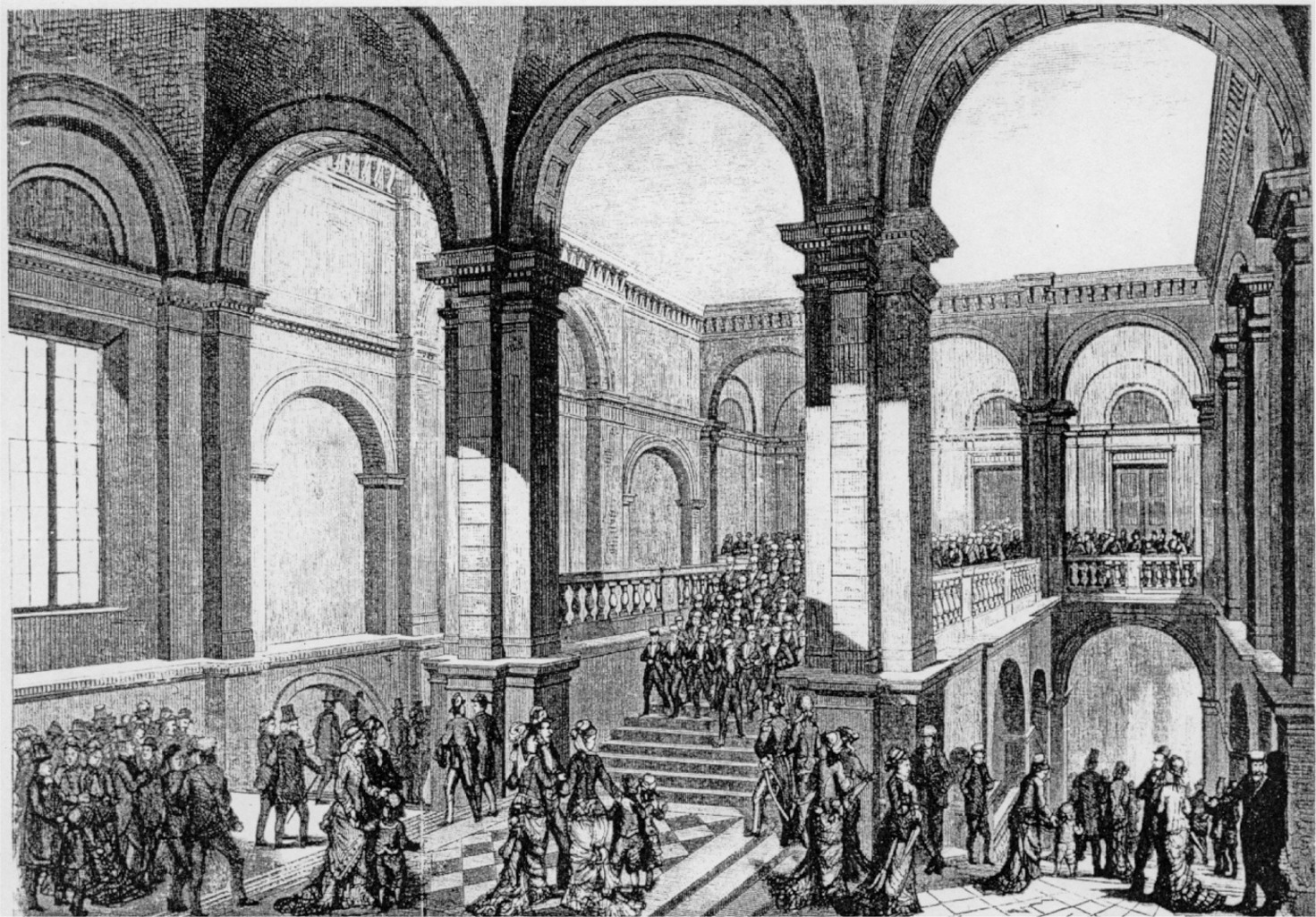
Student singers march down the staircase in Carolina Rediviva, on the occasion of the 400th anniversary of the university in 1877. The "staircase march" (trappmarschen) when the singers led the audience in a march out of the hall where the concert was held, is an annual tradition that was later moved to the new main university building completed in 1887. (The monumental staircase of Carolina was later sacrificed to create more storage space for books.)

The University's Royal Academic Orchestra was founded in 1627. Its main purpose is to play at academic ceremonies but holds concerts on other occasions as well. Its leader has the title of director musices. The position has been held by composers such as Wilhelm Stenhammar, Hugo Alfvén and Lars-Erik Larsson. Affiliated with the university are three choirs, the mixed Uppsala University Choir (Allmänna Sången), founded in 1830, the male choir Orphei Drängar, founded in 1853, and the Academy Chamber Choir of Uppsala, founded in 1957. A number of other choirs and orchestras are affiliated with the nations.

An important name in the recent history of the choirs is Eric Ericson, who was the conductor of both Orphei Drängar and the Chamber Choir. In honour of Ericson, the FöreningsSparbanken endowed the Eric Ericson Chair in Choral Directing, and the Uppsala University Choral Centre was inaugurated in 2000. The centre arranges courses in choral directing. Uppsala universitets Körcentrum

=== Housing crisis ===
Like many cities, there is a shortage of housing in Uppsala, a problem which has existed for many years. Both native Swedes and foreign students are finding it difficult to find accommodation when first enrolling on the university. This problem is however not as bad as it was with several major housing construction projects having been completed after 2010.

There has never been a custom in Sweden for the universities to arrange housing for students, in fact, universities are by law not allowed to own housing. Students are expected to set their own living accommodations on the private market. To make it easier for students to find moderately priced housing, special student rooms and student apartments have been built by the student nations and student unions. However, the student housing is insufficient to accommodate all students. About 40,000 students are eligible to live in the 11,000 available rooms and apartments. Because of the low rent in these apartments and the general lack of housing in Uppsala the student apartments are highly attractive and many try to hold on to the contracts as long as possible even after graduating.

=== Housing ===
Some of the most popular housing accommodations for students are Flogsta, Kantorsgatan, Studentstaden, Studentvägen, Klostergatan, Rackarbergsgatan and many more.Flogsta is one of the international students' biggest and most popular housing choices.

== Athletics ==
Sports play a very small role in the life of the university, compared to British and especially U.S. universities, but have existed in various forms since the early 17th century. Uppsala University is more noted for its musical and choral traditions. Both have partial roots in the 17th-century institution of extracurricular exercises for students from the nobility.

=== The exercitiae ===
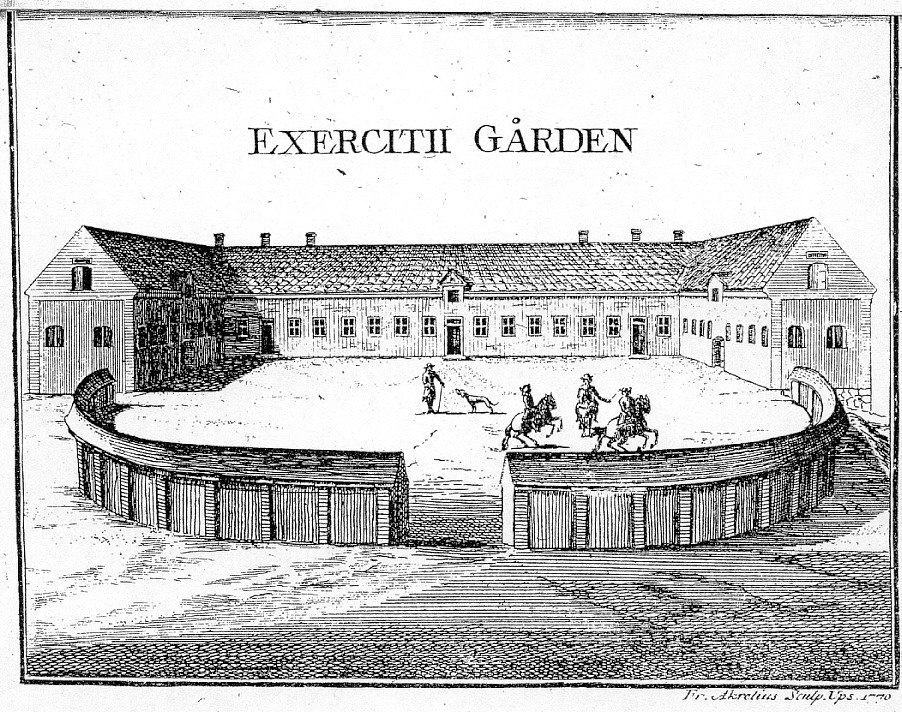
The Exercise Yard in c. 1770; contemporary engraving

To ease the recruitment of students from the nobility, the university started in the 1630s to offer training in a number of exercitiae or "exercises" (Swedish: exercitier) deemed necessary for the well-rounded education of a young nobleman: riding, fencing, dance, drawing and modern languages such as French and Italian. The initiative came from Chancellor Axel Oxenstierna, who saw the value in a well-educated class of civil servants and the danger to his own class if its members would fall behind in academic education compared to those students who came from the lower estates. An "exercise yard," built for the riding and fencing exercises, was demolished in the late 19th century to give place to the new University Hall. Modern languages were made part of the regular academic curriculum in the 19th century. The surviving "exercises" include:

- Fencing – Arranged in collaboration with Upsala Fäktning, a private fencing club.
- Gymnastics and sports – Located at the Art Nouveau University Gymnastics Hall, colloquially known as Svettis (from the Swedish word for sweat)
- Riding – Arranged by the equestrian department of the university, which has its own stables. Leaders of the activities are the Academy Stable Master and the Inspector Equitandi
- Music – Leader of the musical activities is the director musices, who is the conductor of the Royal Academic Orchestra; the current Director Musices is Professor Stefan Karpe
- Drawing – The university appoints an established artist as Drawing Master; free weekly croquis and other lessons are offered in the southern tower of Uppsala Castle

=== Other sports ===
Besides the exercitiae, other sports have had a presence in Uppsala student life. The Upsala Simsällskap, "Uppsala Swimming Society," which is the oldest swimming club in the world, was founded in 1796 by the mathematician Jöns Svanberg. It had no formal connection to the university, but all its earliest members came from academic life. Svanberg even arranged a mock graduation ceremony, a simpromotion, in a parody of the university ceremonies, where those who had graduated from its swimming training were awarded "degrees" of master (magister) and bachelor (kandidat). These degrees stuck, and Swedish swimming schools still use these degrees for different levels of swimming skills.

An attempt was made in the 1870s to introduce academic rowing after the Oxbridge model. The Stockholms Nation acquired a rowing boat in 1877, soon followed by the G öteborgs nation, and for a number of years rowing competitions were held between teams from the two nations. Although rowing never got the strong position it has at the English universities, an annual Uppsala-Lund regatta has been arranged since 1992, between rowing teams from Uppsala and Lund University. The race is held on the Fyris River in Uppsala on even years, and on a river in the vicinity of Lund on odd years. Each year there is at least one full eight crew with cox competing, with both men's and women's teams present. With the recent victory for Uppsala in 2005, the score stands 24–23 in Uppsala's favour.

== Rankings ==
University rankings

Global – Overall
- ARWU World: 88 (2024)
- QS World: 93 (2026)
- THE World: 130 (2025)

=== Overall rankings ===
Uppsala University is one of the most prominent universities in Sweden and is commonly ranked within the top 100 in the world by several ranking agencies. For example, for over ten years, it has been ranked among the 80 best universities in the world in the Academic Ranking of World Universities.

Times Higher Education ranked Uppsala the 101–125th most reputable university worldwide in 2023 and the 68th most international university in the world in 2023.

=== Rankings by subject/area ===
QS Rankings by subject 2023:
Subject (only top 100 are listed)	Uppsala's world rank
Pharmacy & Pharmacology	24
Biological Sciences	52
Life Sciences & Medicine	77
Environmental Sciences	80
Chemistry	83
Sociology	91
Geography	51–100
Politics	51–100
Nursing	51–100
Archeology	51–100
Development Studies	51–100
History	51–100
Theology, Divinity, and Religious Studies	51–100

QS Rankings by broad subject area 2023:
Broad subject area	Uppsala's world rank
Life Sciences & Medicine	77
Natural Sciences	120
Arts and Humanities	151
Social Sciences & Management	216
Engineering & Technology	237

Times Higher Education rankings by subject 2023:
Subject	Uppsala's world rank
Life Sciences	52
Social Sciences	101–125
Arts & Humanities	101–125
Physical Sciences	126–150
Clinical, Pre-clinical & Health	126–150
Business and Economics	251–300
Engineering & Technology	301–400

== Notable people ==
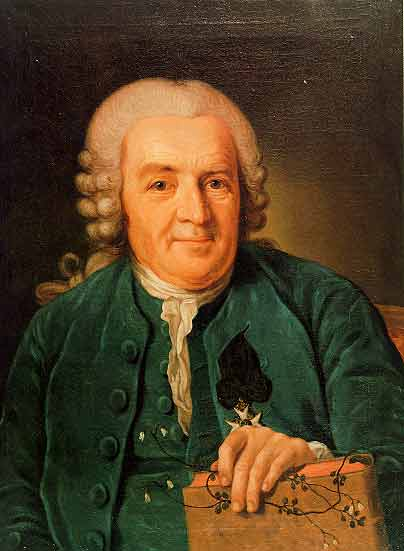
Botanist, physician and zoologist Carl Linnaeus

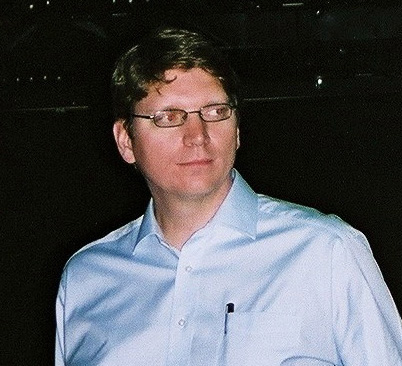
Niklas Zennström, co-founder of KaZaA and Skype

Uppsala University is associated with 8 Nobel Prize laureates, and numerous royalty, academics and public figures.

As the dominant academic institution in Sweden for several centuries, Uppsala University has educated a large proportion of Swedish politicians and civil servants ever since its first period of expansion in the early part of the 17th century. These range from Chancellor of the Realm (rikskansler) Johan Oxenstierna (1611–1657) and Lord Chief Justice (riksdrots) Magnus Gabriel De la Gardie (1622–1686) to the first Social Democratic prime minister of Sweden, Hjalmar Branting (1860–1925). Other alumni are Dag Hammarskjöld (1905–1961), United Nations Secretary General who was (posthumously) awarded the Nobel Peace Prize in 1961, and the Swedish diplomat Hans Blix (born 1928), who was head of the International Atomic Energy Agency 1981–1997, of the UNMOVIC 2000–2003, and previously Swedish minister of foreign affairs 1978–1979. Hammarskjöld and Blix both graduated from the Uppsala Faculty of Law, as did the Swedish minister of foreign affairs Anna Lindh, who was assassinated in 2003.

Most Swedish clergymen, including most bishops and archbishops, have been educated at the university, including, in more recent times, Nathan Söderblom (1866–1931), professor of the history of religions in the Faculty of Theology, later Archbishop of Uppsala, and awarded the Nobel Peace Prize in 1930 for his work as leader of the ecumenical movement.

The university became prominent in the sciences in the 18th century with names such as the physician and botanist Carl Linnaeus (1707–1778), the father of biological and mineralogical taxonomy, and his numerous important pupils, the physicist and astronomer Anders Celsius (1701–1744), inventor of the Celsius scale the predecessor of the Celsius scale, and the chemist Torbern Bergman (1735–1784). Another scientist from this era is Emanuel Swedenborg (1688–1772), better remembered today as a religious mystic. The university played an important role in the Swedish agricultural revolution of the 18th century; Jacob Faggot, the initiator of the reforms, studied at Uppsala. Several of the elements were discovered by Uppsala scientists during this period or later. Jöns Jakob Berzelius, one of the fathers of modern chemistry, received his doctorate in medicine in Uppsala in 1804, but later moved to Stockholm. Uppsala scientists of the 19th century include the physicist Anders Jonas Ångström (1814–1874). During the 20th century, several Nobel laureates in the sciences have been Uppsala alumni or professors at the university.

Many well-known Swedish writers have studied in Uppsala: Georg Stiernhielm (1598–1672) is often called the father of Swedish poetry. The poet and song composer Carl Michael Bellman (1740–1795), without doubt, the best-loved and best-remembered Swedish 18th-century poet, matriculated but left the university after less than a year. The writer, historian and composer Erik Gustaf Geijer (1783–1847), professor of history, and the poet Per Daniel Amadeus Atterbom (1790–1855), professor of poetry, were principal figures of early 19th-century Swedish romanticism. The less than happy experiences of the Uppsala student life of novelist and playwright August Strindberg (1849–1912), resulted in his Från Fjärdingen och Svartbäcken (1877), a collection of short stories set in Uppsala ("From Fjärdingen and Svartbäcken," the title refers to two districts in Uppsala). Other Uppsala alumni are the poet Erik Axel Karlfeldt (1864–1931), who refused the Nobel Prize for Literature in 1918 but received it posthumously in 1931, the novelist and playwright Pär Lagerkvist (1891–1974), Nobel laureate in 1951, and the poet and novelist Karin Boye (1900–1941), for whom one branch of the university library has been named. The Communist leader Ture Nerman (1886–1969) wrote a novel called Olympen, based on his experience as a student in Uppsala. Physicist and engineer Erik Hallén, known for his contributions to antennae theory, graduated with his PhD in 1930.

== International cooperation ==
Uppsala University has signed student exchange agreements with about 400 universities across all parts of the world. It takes part in the Erasmus programme and the Nordplus programme. It also benefits from its membership in the Coimbra Group of universities.

In May 2010 Uppsala joined the Matariki Network of Universities (MNU) together with Dartmouth College (USA), Durham University (UK), Queen's University (Canada), University of Otago (New Zealand), University of Tübingen (Germany), and University of Western Australia (Australia).

== In fiction and popular culture ==
Along with Lund, Uppsala is the historic and traditional centre of Swedish academic life, making it a popular object of reference in Swedish literature, art, and film. Specifically, Uppsala University has appeared notably in Män som hatar kvinnor or The Girl with the Dragon Tattoo by Stieg Larsson.

The Norwegian pop singer Kirsti Sparboe dedicated one of her biggest successes to Uppsala University, publishing in 1969 the song "Ein Student aus Uppsala". The song, originally written in German, lasted 14 weeks in the German charts.

Uppsala University appears as a research centre in the strategy game Empire: Total War.

Uppsala University appears in the novel S. by Doug Dorst and J. J. Abrams. The fictional author V. M. Straka of Ship of Theseus sends Mr. Grahn a confidential letter on Uppsala Universitet letterhead and stamps his signature with "Straka Uppsala Arkiv" (included as an insert to the book).

== See also ==
- List of medieval universities
- List of universities in Sweden
- Swedish University of Agricultural Sciences in Uppsala
- Johannelunds Teologiska Högskola in Uppsala
- Flogsta – student residential area in Uppsala
- Category:Uppsala University alumni
- S*, a collaboration between seven universities and the Karolinska Institutet for training in bioinformatics and genomics
