= Gustavianum =

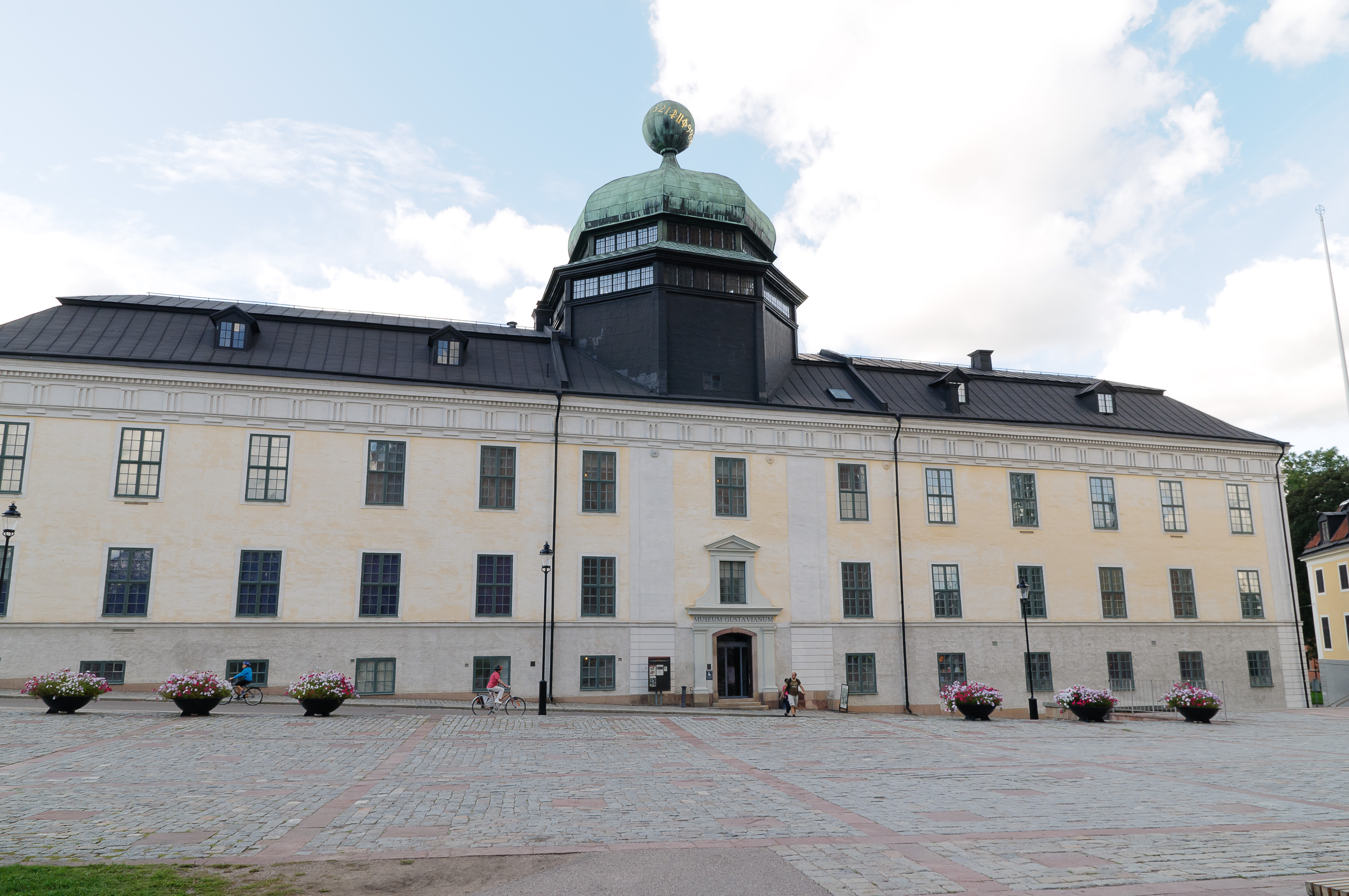
- Gustavianum in 2011
- Etymology: Named after Gustavus Adolphus

General information
- Location: Uppsala, Sweden, Akademigatan 3
- Coordinates: 59°51′28.6″N 17°37′54.1″E
- Current tenants: Museum Gustavianum
- Construction started: 1622
- Inaugurated: 1625
- Client: Uppsala University
- Owner: Statens fastighetsverk

Design and construction
- Architects: Caspar van Panten (original structure); Olaus Rudbeck (1662 expansion)

Gustavianum is the oldest standing building at Uppsala University. It was built between 1622 and 1625, and was used as the main building of the university between 1778 and 1887. Since 1997, it has been used as the university's museum.

== History ==
Gustavianum Auditorium of Uppsala (1690)

During the 16th century, Uppsala University was in decline, and by the latter part of the century, teaching had stopped almost entirely. During Uppsala Synod in 1593, however, there was an official decision to re-open the university. Due to the increasing number of students, the medieval university building Academia Carolina was no longer able to house the entire university; therefore, a second university structure became necessary.

Gustavianum was built between 1622 and 1625. The name Gustavianum comes from Gustavus Adolphus, who in the 1620s donated money for its construction. The building was designed by the Dutch architect Caspar van Panten and contained lecture halls, printing halls and housing for gifted students without means. In 1662, the professor of medicine and polymath, Olaus Rudbeck, significantly expanded the building by adding another floor, as well as constructing the theatrum anatomicum within a large cupola on its roof. The anatomical theatre is today the second-oldest remaining anatomical theatre in the world.

The anatomical theatre was used until the 1750s, when more modern anatomical facilities were inaugurated in the neighbouring building, Konsistoriehuset. The cupola was instead used as the University Library until the construction of the current library Carolina Rediviva in 1841. The cupola was later used as a zoological museum. In 1955, the anatomical theatre was restored according Olaus Rudbeck's original design.

During the 18th century, the building was renovated by the architect Carl Hårleman. After the demolition of Academia Carolina in 1778, Gustavianum became the main building of the university. It maintained this function until 1887, when University Hall was inaugurated. Teaching from the institutions of architecture, antiquity and Egyptology continued in the building until 1997, when it was rebuilt into a museum.

== Museum Gustavianum ==
Museum Gustavianum
- Established: 17 June 1997; 29 years ago
- Location: Akademigatan 3, Uppsala, Sweden
- Visitors: 82,539 (2016)
- Director: Marika Hedin
- Website: www.gustavianum.uu.se

Museum Gustavianum was inaugurated by King Carl XVI Gustaf on 17 June 1997. As the university museum, all of the exhibited objects are part of the university's collection. In 2016, the museum attracted 82,539 visitors.

The museum has five permanent exhibitions:

- The Anatomical Theatre, containing the theatre itself together with objects concerning Uppsala's medicinal history
- The Augsburg Art Cabinet, a cabinet of curiosities containing approximately 1,000 artifacts made in 1633
- The Mediterranean Sea and the Gulf of the Nile, containing objects from classical antiquity, most of them being excavated by Uppsala University archaeologists
- Uppsala University history containing lecture notes from the first semester of the university in 1477 and exhibitions concerning Uppsala scientists such as Carl von Linné, Anders Celsius and Nils von Rosenstein
- Valsgärde. The Vendel Age – The Viking Age, containing objects excavated from the burial field in Valsgärde, approximately 7 kilometres (4.3 mi) north of Uppsala, which was used from the 6th to the 11th century.

== Gallery ==
Anatomical Theatre

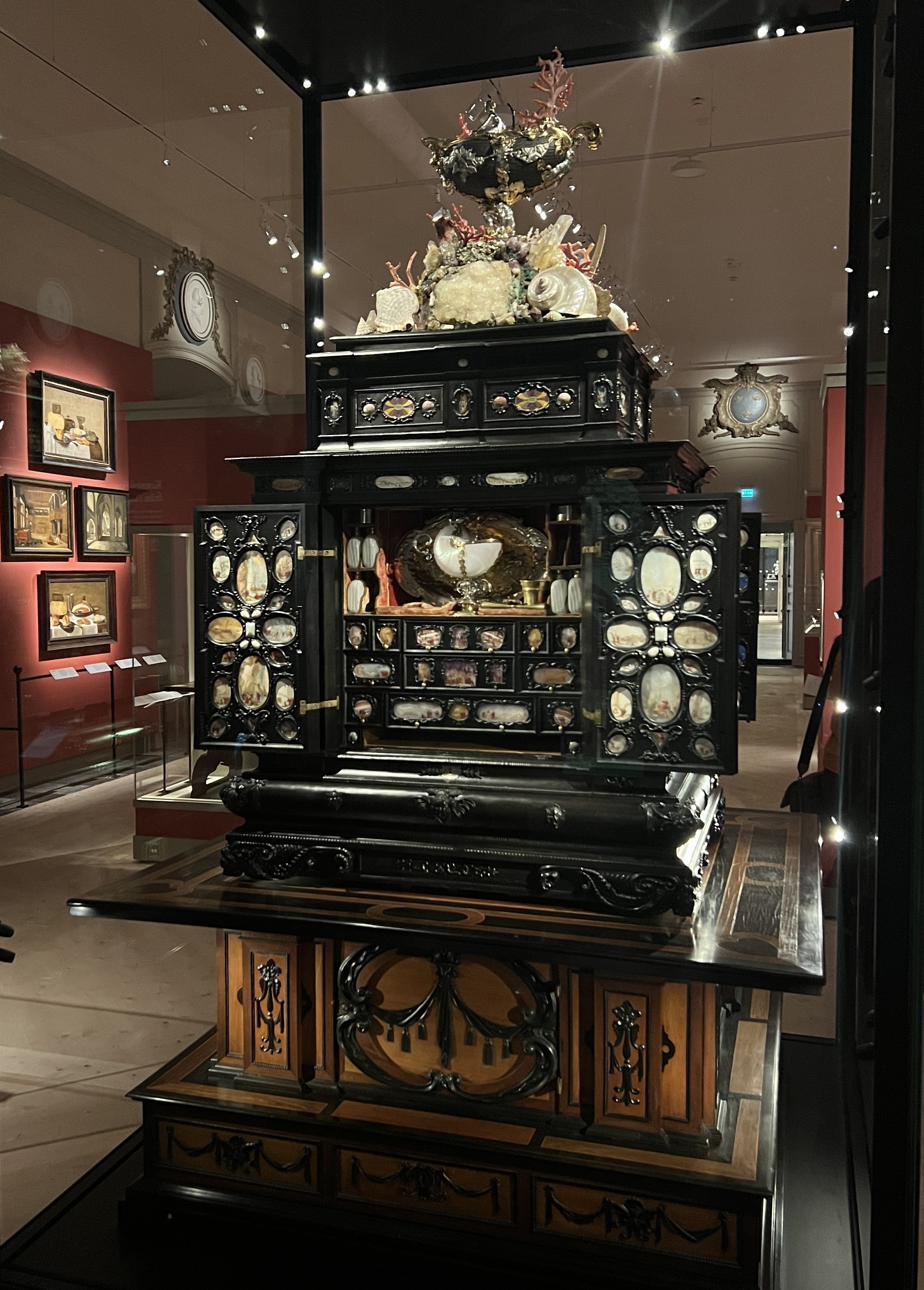
Augsburg Art Cabinet

7th-century swords discovered in boat graves at Valsgärde.

7th-century helmet from boat grave at Valsgärde.

8th-century horse bridle discovered in a boat grave at Valsgärde.
