= Herman Geijer =

Swedish author

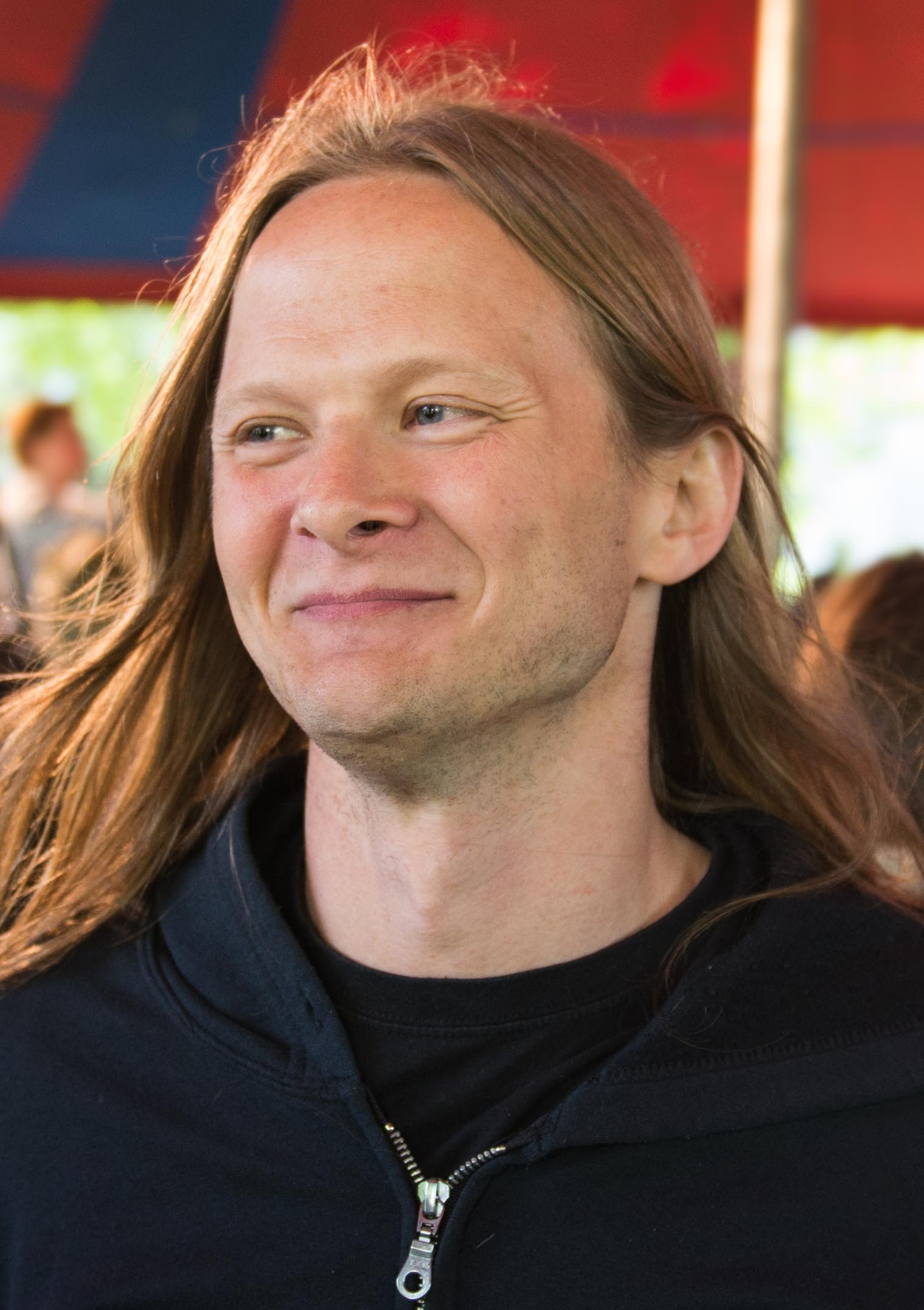
- Geijer in 2015.
- Born: 4 December 1978 (age 47); Uppsala, Sweden
- Occupations: Author, survivalist

Herman Geijer (born 4 December 1978) is a Swedish author, lecturer and zombie-survivalist expert.

Geijer grew up in Örsundsbro outside of Uppsala. He studied esthetic program at Westerlundska gymnasiet in Enköping and has also worked as a coat handler at for Carolina Rediviva and Arbetarnas bildningsförbund (ABF) in Uppsala. He then worked as a business developer for ABF and is now located in Stockholm. Geijer was voted by the listeners of the radio show Sommar i P1 at Sveriges Radio as their favourite, with his show broadcast on 15 July 2015. Geijers show got positive reviews from media.

Many of the radio listeners noted that Geijer played "Beväpna er", a song by Ebba Grön. This was celebrated by some and criticized by others, and references was made to when Athena Farrokhzad was criticized for playing the same song on the show in 2014.

Geijer has hosted survival courses at ABF were a zombie apocalypse was used as a scenario for survival. In December 2014, he published the book Zombieöverlevnad: din guide till apokalypsen, about how to survive a zombie invasion.
