= Sällskapet till belöning för trotjänare =

Sällskapet till belöning av trotjänare
- Formation: 1828
- Type: nonprofit organization
- Headquarters: Grillby, Sweden
- Methods: awardings
- Official language: Swedish

Sällskapet till belöning av trotjänare is a nonprofit organization in Sweden, established in 1828, giving prizes and awards to domestic worker girls and women who have worked for at least 15 years for the same family in Stockholm County. The activities of the organization was brought to public attention on 4 March 1987 at SR P1.

The headquarters were in Saltsjö-Duvnäs before being relocated to Grillby.

In 1988, a newspaper announce about the organization holding annual meeting led to the making of the programme Frida, en trotjänarinna. The initiative to the establishment was taken by Carl Löwenhielm.
