= Revelsta Manor =

Historic house and estate in Sweden

Coordinates: 59.8096°N 16.9707°E

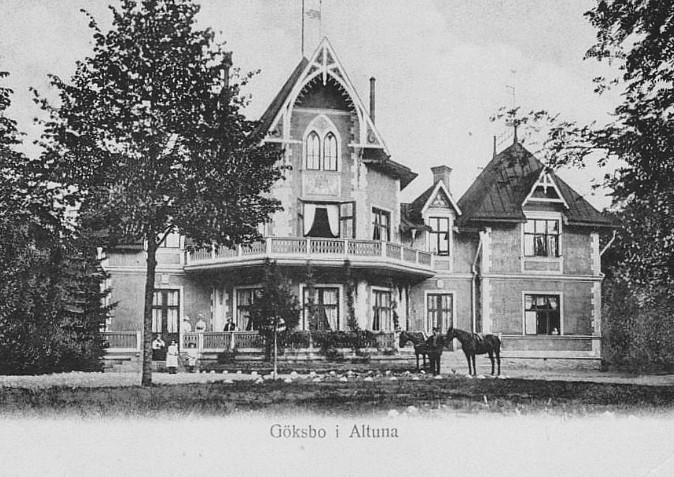
Revelsta Manor house called the "Göksbo", literally the 'Cuckoo's nest'. Picture from around the year 1900.

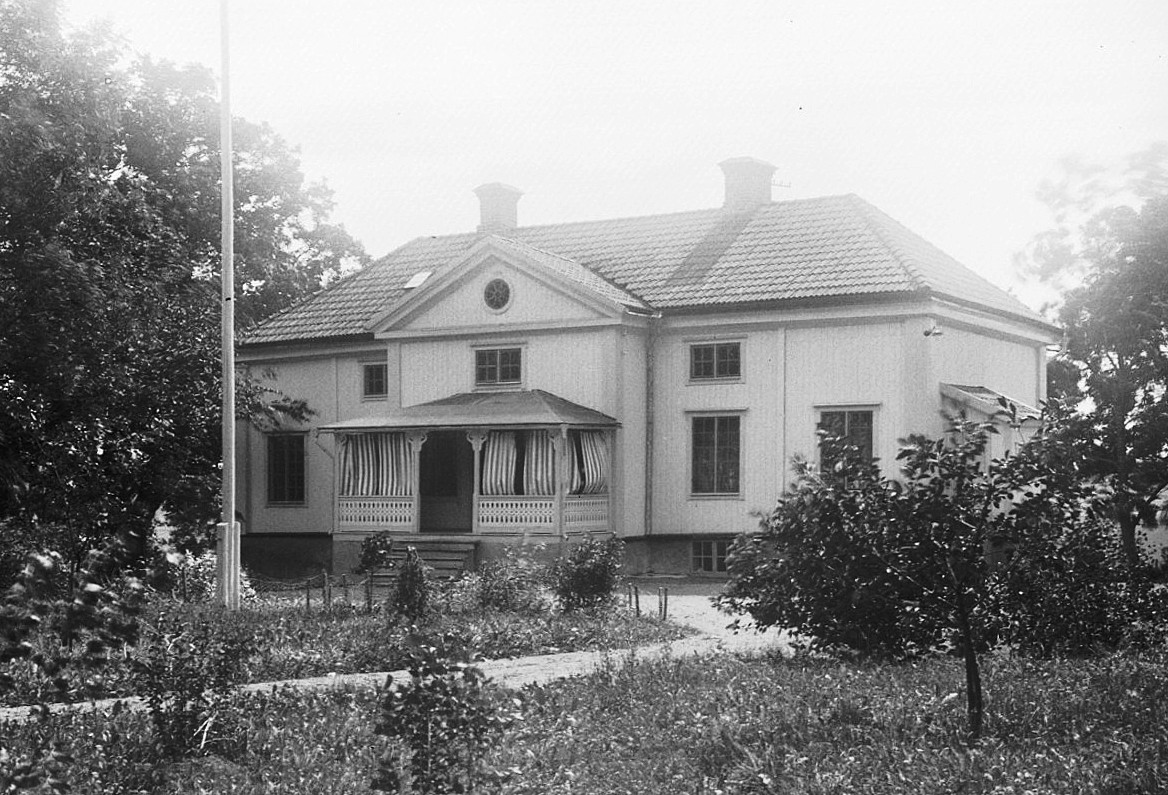
Revelsta Lodge in the early 1920s.

Revelsta Manor (Swedish: Revelsta herrgård) is an historic manor house and estate in the Enköping municipality, Uppland, Sweden. The estate has belonged to the Benzelstierna and von Engeström noble families since 1762.
