= Erik Waller =

Erik Waller may refer to:

- Erik Waller (collector) (1875–1955), Swedish surgeon and book collector
- Erik Waller (sailor) (1887–1958), Swedish sailor
