= Veckholms prästholme =

Nature reserve in Uppsala, Sweden

- IUCN category IV (habitat/species management area)
- Interactive map of Veckholms prästholme
- Location: Enköping Municipality, Uppsala County, Sweden
- Coordinates: 59°24′17″N 17°23′59″E
- Area: 29.64 ha (0.11 sq mi)
- Established: June 8, 1961
- Governing body: County Administrative Board of Uppsala
- Website: www.lansstyrelsen.se/uppsala/besoksmal/naturreservat/veckholms-prastholme.html

Veckholms prästholme is a nature reserve on an island of the same name in Enköping Municipality in Uppsala County.

== Geography and Nature ==
The nature reserve was established on June 8, 1961, and covers a total area of 29.64 hectares (approx. 73.2 acres), of which 0.924 hectares consist of water. The island is characterized by a mild local climate that promotes lush, wild vegetation. In the central parts, an abundant broadleaf deciduous forest spreads out, primarily consisting of: Lime (linden), elm, and oak and flowers including lily of the valley, musk madder, and flowering shrubs such as woodruff and honeysuckle. On the eastern side of the island, there is a riparian swamp forest with periodically flooded areas, where black alders grow on elevated pedestals. Species such as yellow iris and meadowsweet also thrive here, giving the environment a distinctively lush, jungle-like character. Because forestry has never been practiced on the island, older and younger trees grow side by side, and dead wood is left to decompose naturally.

== Bird Protection Areas ==
Belonging to the nature reserve are also the two smaller islets of Klockargubben and Spegubben (also known as Spögubbskär). Both of these islets are designated as bird protection areas, meaning that access and landing are strictly prohibited there during the nesting season from April 1 to July 15.

== History ==
The name Prästholmen (historically linked to the church/parish) reflects its long-standing administrative connection to the local ecclesiastical lands. Today, the island is owned by the Diocese of Uppsala (Uppsala stift), maintaining a historical link to the church communities of the region. Also only one person has lived on Prästholmen. He was a fisherman who lived at Köksviken on the west side of the island around the turn of the century. Traces of his home can still be seen on the shore.
