= Uppström =

Uppström is a surname. Notable people with the surname include:

- Anders Uppström (1806–1865), Swedish philologist
- Tore Uppström (1937–2006), Swedish pianist
