= Hummelsta =

- Location within Uppsala Location within Sweden
- Coordinates: 59°37′32″N 16°56′31″E
- Country: Sweden
- Province: Uppland
- County: Uppsala County
- Municipality: Enköping Municipality

Area
  - Total: 0.70 km^{2} (0.27 sq mi)

Population (31 December 2020)
  - Total: 945
  - Density: 1,400/km^{2} (3,500/sq mi)
- Time zone: UTC+1 (CET)
  - Summer (DST): UTC+2 (CEST)

Hummelsta is a locality situated in Enköping Municipality, Uppsala County, Sweden with 1,002 inhabitants in 2010.

The buildings consist largely of villas, but recently, some townhouses have been added. Hummelsta is located along the old highway, E18, and many of the inhabitants commute to work in Enköping or Västerås. Hummelsta lacks own major employers. The community has a school named Hummelstaskolan, which has about 250 students.

In 1959, a gas station opened with a restaurant. It was open around the clock, but was closed in 2010 when the E18 was rebuilt outside the community. Hummelsta also had a big candy store, Godisstoppet, which closed the same year for the same reason.
