= Fjärdhundra =

- Location within Uppsala Location within Sweden
- Coordinates: 59°46′38″N 16°55′35″E
- Country: Sweden
- Province: Uppland
- County: Uppsala County
- Municipality: Enköping Municipality

Area
  - Total: 1.08 km^{2} (0.42 sq mi)

Population (31 December 2020)
  - Total: 932
  - Density: 863/km^{2} (2,240/sq mi)
- Time zone: UTC+1 (CET)
  - Summer (DST): UTC+2 (CEST)

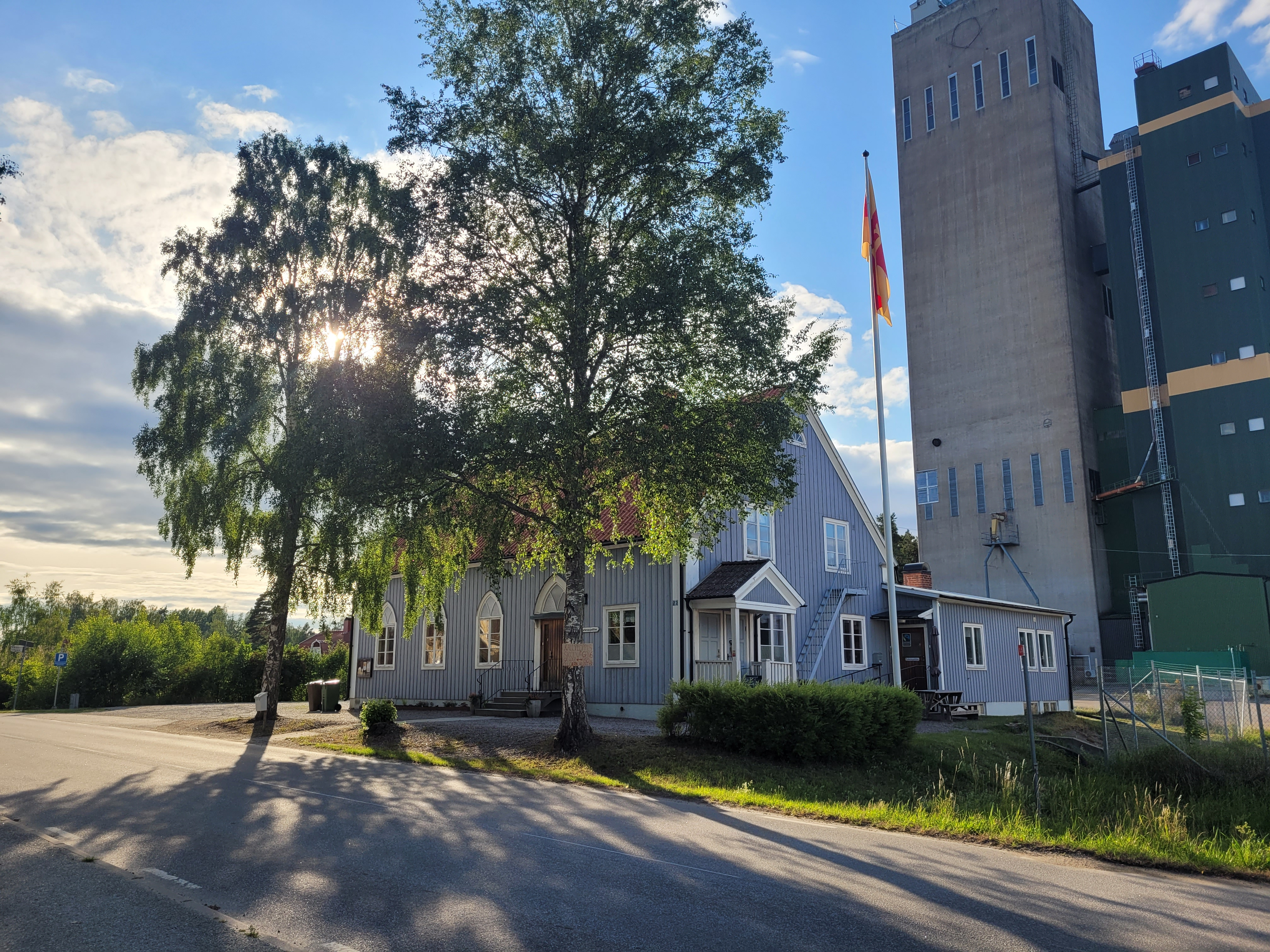

Fjärdhundra is a locality situated in Enköping Municipality, Uppsala County, Sweden with 951 inhabitants in 2010.

The name was given to a railway station in 1906, taken from the region Fjärdhundraland, which means land of the four hundreds, where in Sweden hundred meant an area having one hundred trained soldiers or shipsmen.
