= Kanutus Johannis =

Swedish friar and writer

Kanutus Johannis (first half of the 15th century – 28 August 1496) was a Swedish Franciscan friar, writer and book collector. Coming from a burgher family, he rose within the ranks of the Greyfriars Friary in Stockholm and eventually became its leader. He wrote in Latin and produced a small variety of works in a style which has been called "unremarkable" but which remains a testament of medieval Swedish literature written in Latin. His book collection, acquired partially by purchases abroad, was donated to the monastery and partially survives within the collections of Uppsala University Library.

== Biography ==
Born into a burgher family in Stockholm, Kanutus Johannis made a career within the Catholic Church and his name is therefore usually rendered in the Latinised form which he used himself when writing. His Swedish name was probably Knut Jönsson or Knut Jenssen. The name of his father is unknown, but his mother Gertrud was the daughter of Henrik Dyngxstad or Dingstede, a German-born member of the city council of Stockholm. His brother Erik Jenssen was also a council member from 1477 and became mayor of Stockholm in 1490. Kanutus Johannis's brother was among the people executed by forces loyal to King Christian II of Denmark during the Stockholm Bloodbath in 1520.

Kanutus Johannis was enrolled in the University of Greifswald on 8 November 1467, and was already then a friar at the Greyfriars Friary in Stockholm. He probably continued his studies in Strasbourg, and then returned to the Nordic countries. For a brief period, he was lector at the monastery in Randers (Denmark), and in 1476 obtained a Bachelor of Sacred Theology from the studium generale (a kind of theological college) in Lund. He then returned to Stockholm and the Franciscan monastery there. He held several positions within the monastery, first as a teacher and later (from 1482) as custos over the ecclesiastical province of Dacia. From 1484 he appears to have been the head of the monastery in Stockholm. He appears to have been removed from this position for a short while, perhaps due to a conflict with the other friars, but in 1490 is again mentioned as the head of the community. At approximately the same time, he continued his theological studies at Uppsala University. In 1495 he was offered the position of head of the studium generale in Lund, but declined and instead joined the stricter Observant branch of the order and moved to Denmark. After only one year, he moved back to Sweden and instead joined the Franciscans in Söderköping. He died there in 1496.

== Literary works and book collecting ==
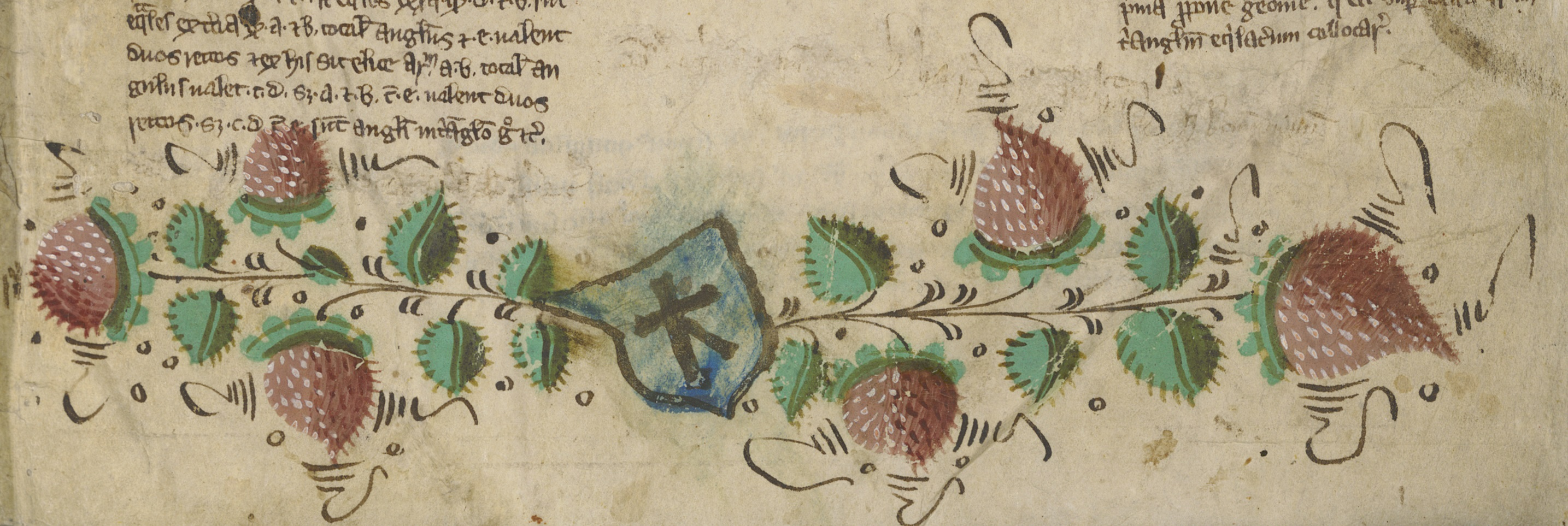
Ex libris of Kanutus Johannis

A small number of texts written in Latin by Kanutus Johannis have been preserved. Among these are a treatise on the Holy Virgin and a poem dedicated to Archbishop Jakob Ulvsson. His style has been described as "unremarkable", but Isak Collijn draws attention to the ease with which he wrote in Latin. The importance of Johannis as a writer lies perhaps more in the fact that his production is an example of the type of Latin literature which may have been produced in medieval Sweden, since so little of it has been preserved at all. It also contains information about contemporary events; e.g., the arrival in Stockholm of the statue of Saint George and the Dragon is mentioned by Johannis.

In addition to his own literary ambitions, Kanutus Johannis was a book collector and contributed to the library of the monastery. Notes made by him or by someone else at his request have been preserved in a number of books from this library, from which 27 books have survived and passed into the ownership of Uppsala University Library. Some of these books he bought himself (he has noted acquisitions in Greifswald, Strasbourg, Lund, Uppsala, and Tallinn), but he also had several books in the monastery repaired and rebound. His ex libris is found in 14 of the preserved medieval manuscripts from the monastery. It consists of his coat of arms (azure, a house mark sable) bordered by branches of woodland strawberry painted at the bottom of one of the pages of each of these books. The ex libris of Kanutus Johannis is one of the oldest preserved marks of book ownership from Sweden. The books which he donated to the library are on theology, philosophy, canon law, astronomy, astrology, Swedish history, and Latin poetry.

== Works cited ==
- Collijn, Isak (1917). "Franciskanernas bibliotek på Gråmunkeholmen i Stockholm med särskild hänsyn till Kanutus Johannis' verksamhet" [The library of the Franciscans on Gråmunkeholmen in Stockholm with special regard to the activity of Kanutus Johannis]. Nordisk tidskrift för bok- och biblioteksväsen (in Swedish): 101–171.
- Dahl, Torsten, ed. (1948). Svenska män och kvinnor. Biografisk uppslagsbok [Swedish men and women. Biographical dictionary] (in Swedish). Vol. 4. Stockholm: Albert Bonnier. OCLC 4629338.
- Munkhammar, Lars (2000). Böckerna från Gråmunkeholmen [The books from Gråmunkeholmen] (PDF) (in Swedish). Uppsala universitet Universitetsbiblioteket.
- Regner, Elisabeth (2013). Det medeltida Stockholm: en arkeologisk guidebok [Medieval Stockholm. An archaeological guide book] (in Swedish). Lund: Historiska media. ISBN 9789186297886.
