= Anders Uppström =

Swedish philologist

Anders Uppström. Painting owned by Gästrike-Hälsinge nation, Uppsala.

Anders Uppström (29 June 1806 – 21 January 1865) was a Swedish philologist, particularly known for his work on the Codex Argenteus, the manuscript of Bishop Wulfila's Gothic Bible translation held by the Uppsala University Library.

Born into the family of a factory worker at Hammarby bruk in Gästrikland, Uppström had his education partly paid for by his father's employer Tore Petré. After completing school in Gävle, he enrolled at Uppsala University in 1824, and was awarded the highest degree at the Faculty of Philosophy, filosofie magister, in 1833. He worked as a teacher of Greek and Hebrew at the Uppsala Cathedral School between 1835 and 1859 (as kollega from 1834, förste adjunkt from 1845, and lektor — lecturer — from 1858). He was appointed docent of the Gothic language at the University in 1850, and professor extraordinary of "Mesogothic and related languages" in 1859.

Uppström started studying Gothic in 1834 and became docent based on his dissertation, Aivaggeljo þairh Matþaiu eller Fragmenterna af Matthæi Evangelium på götiska jemte ordförklaring och ordböjningslära, for which the Swedish Academy awarded him its Royal Prize. In 1854, he published an edition of the parts of Wulfila's Gothic Bible translation that were known from the manuscript Codex Argenteus. This codex had been kept in Uppsala since the late seventeenth century and is thought to have originated at the court of Ostrogothic king Theodoric the Great (d. 526). His edition contained only the text from the 177 manuscript leaves then extant, ten leaves having mysteriously disappeared between 1821 and 1834. The ten missing leaves were recovered in 1857, returned to Uppström by an old library janitor on his deathbed. Uppström published a supplement to his previous edition, Decem Codicis argenteæ rediviva folia the same year.

A journey in 1860 to Rome, Milan, and Wolfenbüttel, financed by the sons of his childhood patron Petré, resulted in Fragmenta gothica selecta (1861) and another journey to the Ambrosian Library in Milan in 1863 to study the so-called Ambrosian Gothic manuscripts led to Codices gotici ambrosiani, which was published posthumously by his son Anders Erik Wilhelm Uppström in 1868.

Uppström also published works on comparative Indo-European linguistics, Swedish dialects, and a variety of other topics.
