= Hjälstaby =

- Location within Uppsala Location within Sweden
- Coordinates: 59°41′0″N 17°23′0″E
- Country: Sweden
- Municipality: Uppsala Municipality
- County: Uppsala County
- Municipality: Enköping

Area
  - Total: 2.87 km^{2} (1.11 sq mi)

Population (2005-12-31)
  - Total: 120
- Time zone: UTC+1 (CET)
  - Summer (DST): UTC+2 (CEST)

Hjälstaby is a village in Enköping Municipality, Uppsala County, Sweden.
