= Frida, en trotjänarinna =

- Country of origin: Sweden
- Original language: Swedish

Production
- Producer: Marianne Gillgren

Original release
- Network: SVT1
- Release: 3 May 1999

Frida, en trotjänarinna is a 1999 documentary film which originally aired over SVT on 3 May 1999. It aired in Denmark on 10 March 2000.

The initiative was taken following a newspaper announce for the annual general meeting of Sällskapet till belöning för trotjänare in 1988, which led to the idea of a programme about a job that had died out more and more. Filmed in 1988, 1993 and 1998 it depicted 76 years old Frida who still, despite her age, was working as a domestic worker in Stockholm (in 1998 she had finally left, and died in 2002, 90 years old).

The first part aired as part of the programme 20:00.

It won an Ikaros Award and the Prix Egalia. It also competed at FIPA in France and BANFF in Canada.
