= Lillkyrka =

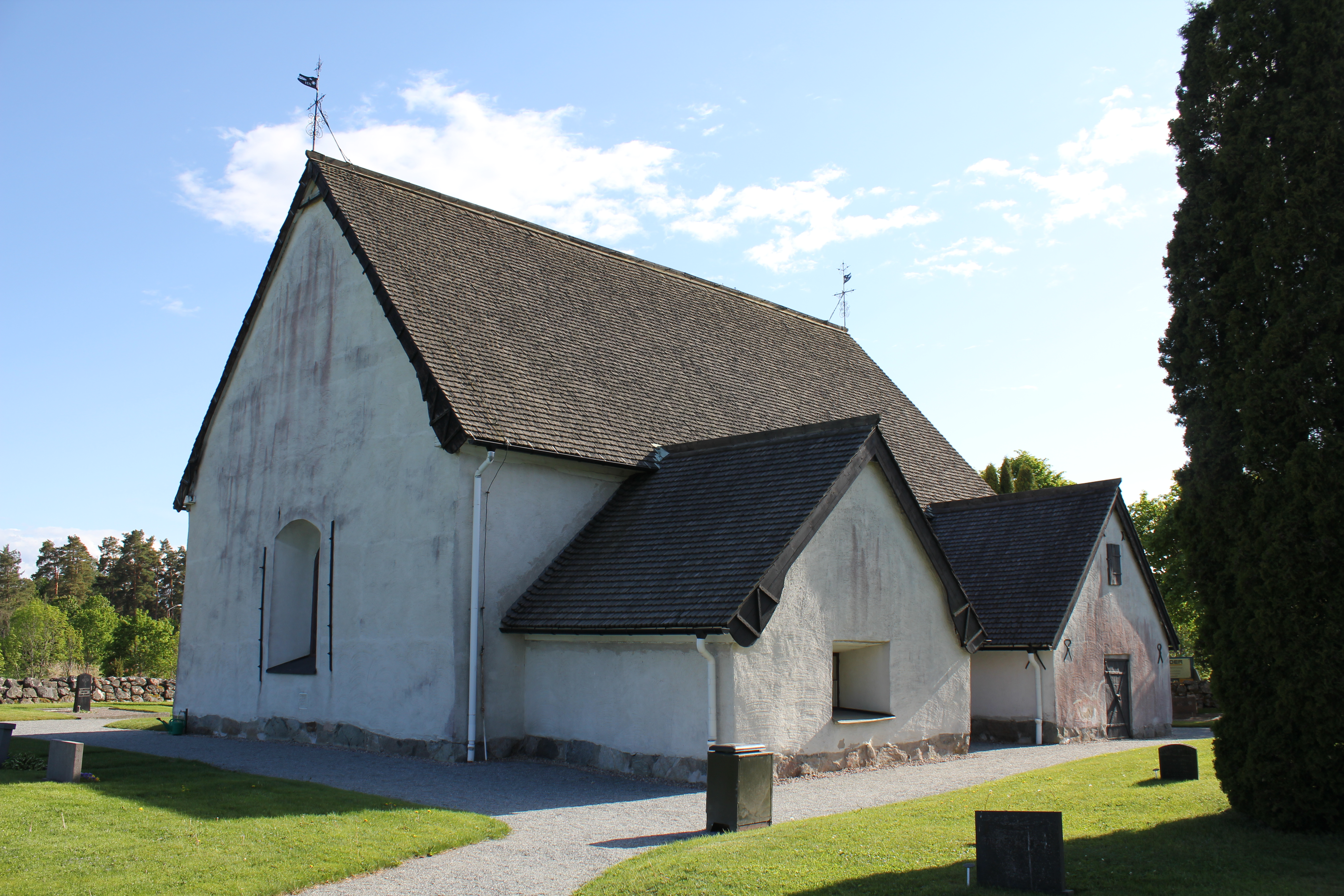
- Lillkyrka church

- Location within Uppsala Location within Sweden
- Coordinates: 59°33′30″N 17°14′45″E
- Country: Sweden
- Province: Uppland
- County: Uppsala County
- Municipality: Enköping Municipality

Area
  - Total: 0.35 km^{2} (0.14 sq mi)

Population (31 December 2020)
  - Total: 279
  - Density: 800/km^{2} (2,100/sq mi)
- Time zone: UTC+1 (CET)
  - Summer (DST): UTC+2 (CEST)

Lillkyrka is a locality situated in Enköping Municipality, Uppsala County, Sweden with 301 inhabitants in 2010.
