= God (word) =

English word

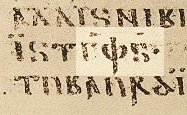
Earliest attestation of the Germanic word in the 6th-century Codex Argenteus (Mt 5:34)

The English word god comes from the Old English god, which itself is derived from the Proto-Germanic *gudą. Its cognates in other Germanic languages include guþ, gudis (both Gothic), guð (Old Norse), god (Old Saxon, Old Frisian, and Old Dutch), and got (Old High German).

== Etymology ==
The Proto-Germanic meaning of *gudą and its etymology is uncertain. It is generally agreed that it derives from a Proto-Indo-European neuter passive perfect participle *ǵʰu-tó-m. Depending on which possibility is preferred, the pre-Christian meaning of the Germanic term may either have been (in the "pouring" case) "libation" or "that which is libated upon, idol" — or, as Watkins opines in the light of Greek χυτη γαια "poured earth" meaning "tumulus", "the Germanic form may have referred in the first instance to the spirit immanent in a burial mound" — or (in the "invoke" case) "invocation, prayer" (compare the meanings of Sanskrit brahman) or "that which is invoked."

The earliest uses of the word God in Germanic writing is often cited to be in the Gothic Bible or Wulfila Bible, which is the Christian Bible as translated by Ulfilas into the Gothic language spoken by the Eastern Germanic, or Gothic, tribes. The oldest parts of the Gothic Bible, contained in the Codex Argenteus, are estimated to be from the fourth century. During the fourth century, the Goths were converted to Christianity, largely through the efforts of Bishop Ulfilas, who translated the Bible into the Gothic language in Nicopolis ad Istrum in today's northern Bulgaria. The words guda and guþ were used for God in the Gothic Bible.

=== Influence of Christianity ===
God entered English when the language still had a system of grammatical gender. The word and its cognates were initially neuter but underwent transition when their speakers converted to Christianity, "as a means of distinguishing the personal God of the Christians from the impersonal divine powers acknowledged by pagans." However, traces of the neuter endured. While these words became syntactically masculine, so that determiners and adjectives connected to them took masculine endings, they sometimes remained morphologically neuter, which could be seen in their inflections: In the phrase, guþ meins, "my God," from the Gothic Bible, for example, guþ inflects as if it were still a neuter because it lacks a final -s, but the possessive adjective meins takes the final -s that it would with other masculine nouns.

God and its cognates likely had a general, predominantly plural or collective sense prior to conversion to Christianity. After conversion, the word was commonly used in the singular to refer to the Christian deity, and also took on characteristics of a name.

== Translations ==
The word god was used to represent Greek theos and Latin deus in Bible translations, first in the Gothic translation of the New Testament by Ulfilas. For the etymology of deus, see *Dyēus.

Greek θεός " (theos) means god in English. It is often connected with Greek θέω (theō), "run", and θεωρέω (theoreō), "to look at, to see, to observe", Latin feriae "holidays", fanum "temple", and also Armenian di-k` "gods". Alternative suggestions (e.g. by De Saussure) connect *dhu̯es- "smoke, spirit", attested in Baltic and Germanic words for "spook" and ultimately cognate with Latin fumus "smoke." The earliest attested form of the word is the Mycenaean Greek te-o (plural te-o-i), written in Linear B syllabic script.

== Capitalization ==
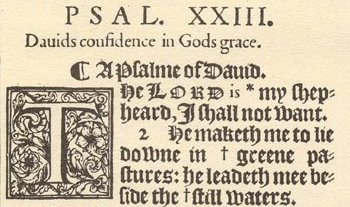
KJV of 1611 (Psalms 23:1,2): Occurrence of "LORD" (and "God" in the heading)

The development of English orthography was dominated by Christian texts. Capitalized, "God" was first used to refer to the Abrahamic God and may now signify any monotheistic conception of God, including the translations of the Arabic Allāh, Persian Khuda, Indic Ishvara and the Maasai Ngai.

In the English language, capitalization is used for names by which a god is known, including "God". Consequently, its capitalized form is not used for multiple gods or when referring to the generic idea of a deity.

Pronouns referring to a god are also often capitalized by adherents to a religion as an indication of reverence, and are traditionally in the masculine gender ("He", "Him", "His" etc) unless specifically referring to a goddess.

== See also ==
- Anglo-Saxon paganism
- Bhagavan (Hindi word)
- El (deity) (Semitic word)
- Elohim
- Jumala (Finnish word)
- Tanri (Turkish word)
- Yahweh
- YHWH
- Allah
