= Bredsand =

- Location within Uppsala Location within Sweden
- Coordinates: 59°36′N 17°04′E
- Country: Sweden
- Province: Uppland
- County: Uppsala County
- Municipality: Enköping Municipality

Area
  - Total: 0.85 km^{2} (0.33 sq mi)

Population (31 December 2020)
  - Total: 1,664
  - Density: 2,000/km^{2} (5,100/sq mi)
- Time zone: UTC+1 (CET)
  - Summer (DST): UTC+2 (CEST)

Bredsand (or Ryssbo) is an urban locality situated in Enköping Municipality, Uppsala County, Sweden with 465 inhabitants in 2010.
