= Greyfriars, Stockholm =

Franciscan friary in Sweden (1270–1527)

Coordinates: 59°19′29″N 18°3′53″E

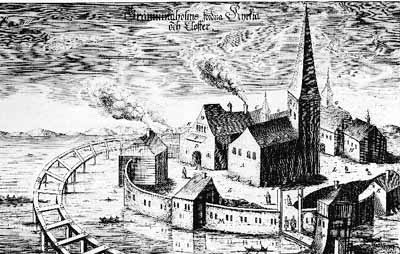
Greyfriars, Stockholm, 1524.

Greyfriars (Swedish: Gråmunkeklostret) otherwise the Franciscan Friary in Stockholm on the island of Riddarholmen was a friary of the Franciscan Order, in operation from 1270 until the Swedish Reformation of 1527.

== History ==
The friary was founded by the gift of King Magnus III of Sweden in 1270; in 1288, he also gave the new establishment the Skeppsholmen area. It was because of the friary that Riddarholmen has been called Gråbrödraholm (Grey Brothers' Islet), Munckholmen (Monk's Islet), and Gråmunkeholm or Gråmunkeholmen (Grey Friar's Islet). During the 15th century the island of Kungsholmen was also called Munklägret (Monk's Camp) because of the friars' activities in the area. At the end of the 15th century, it was headed by Kanutus Johannis, who contributed several volumes to its library. After the Siege of Tre Kronor on 9 May 1502, the defeated Queen Christina of Saxony was kept prisoner here by Sten Sture the Elder.

=== Dissolution ===
In 1527, the friary was dissolved because of the Reformation. The friars were forced to leave the buildings, which were then used as a hospital and as a residence for the former nuns of St. Clare's Priory, Stockholm. The hospital was moved to Danviken Hospital in 1551, after which the building housed the theological school Collegium Regium Stockholmense in 1576–1593, and the Nicolai Trivial School until 1666.

== Later history ==
Riddarholmen Church is what now remains of the abbey.

Part of the area south of the church was excavated in 2010. The skeleton of a medieval monk was found buried complete, save for its left leg which was lost during renovations in 1945.
