= Grillby =

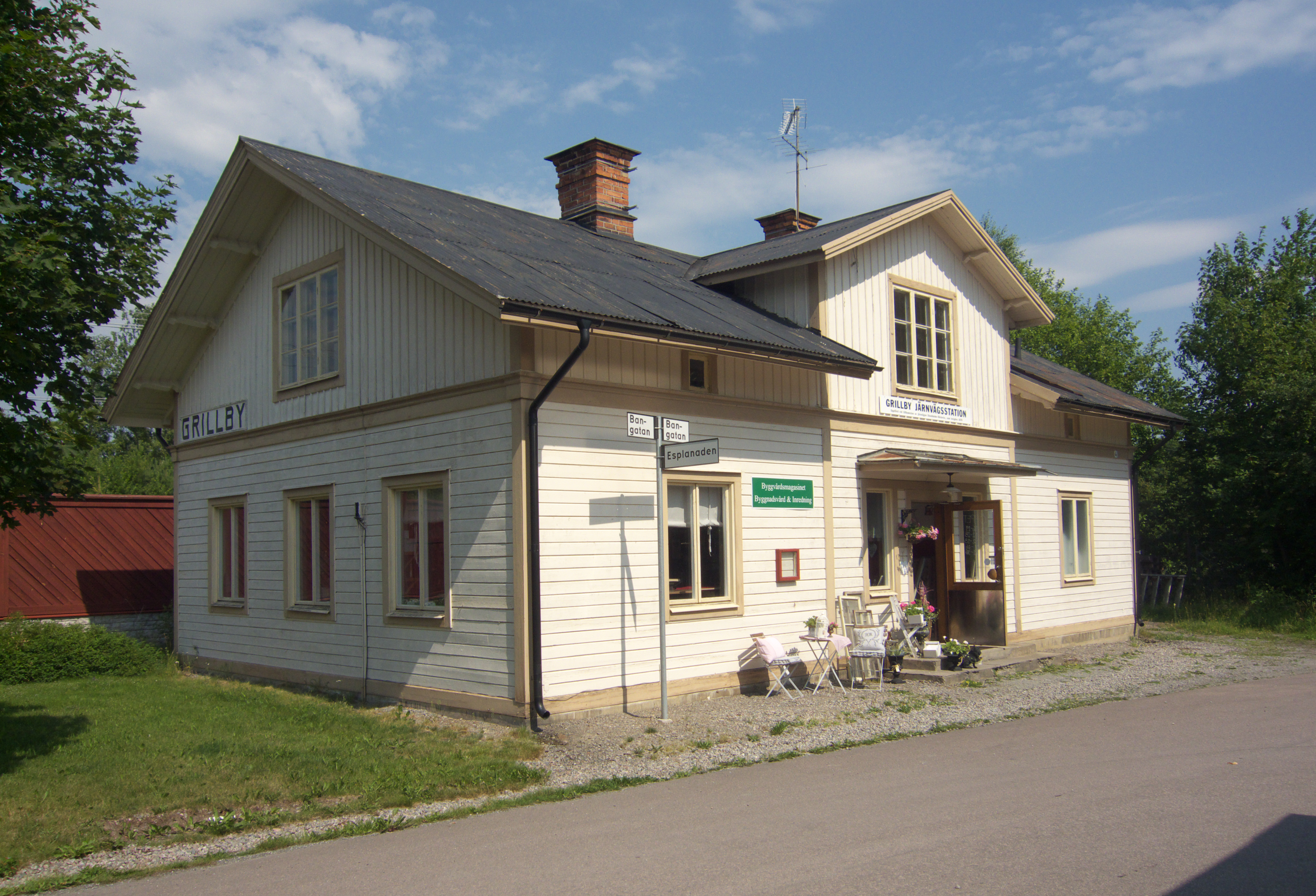
- The former Grillby rail station, now a building maintenance shop

- Location within Uppsala Location within Sweden
- Coordinates: 59°37′N 17°15′E
- Country: Sweden
- Province: Uppland
- County: Uppsala County
- Municipality: Enköping Municipality

Area
  - Total: 0.85 km^{2} (0.33 sq mi)

Population (31 December 2020)
  - Total: 1,109
  - Density: 1,300/km^{2} (3,400/sq mi)
- Time zone: UTC+1 (CET)
  - Summer (DST): UTC+2 (CEST)

Grillby is a locality situated in Enköping Municipality, Uppsala County, Sweden with 972 inhabitants in 2010.
