= Erik Waller (collector) =

Swedish surgeon and book collector

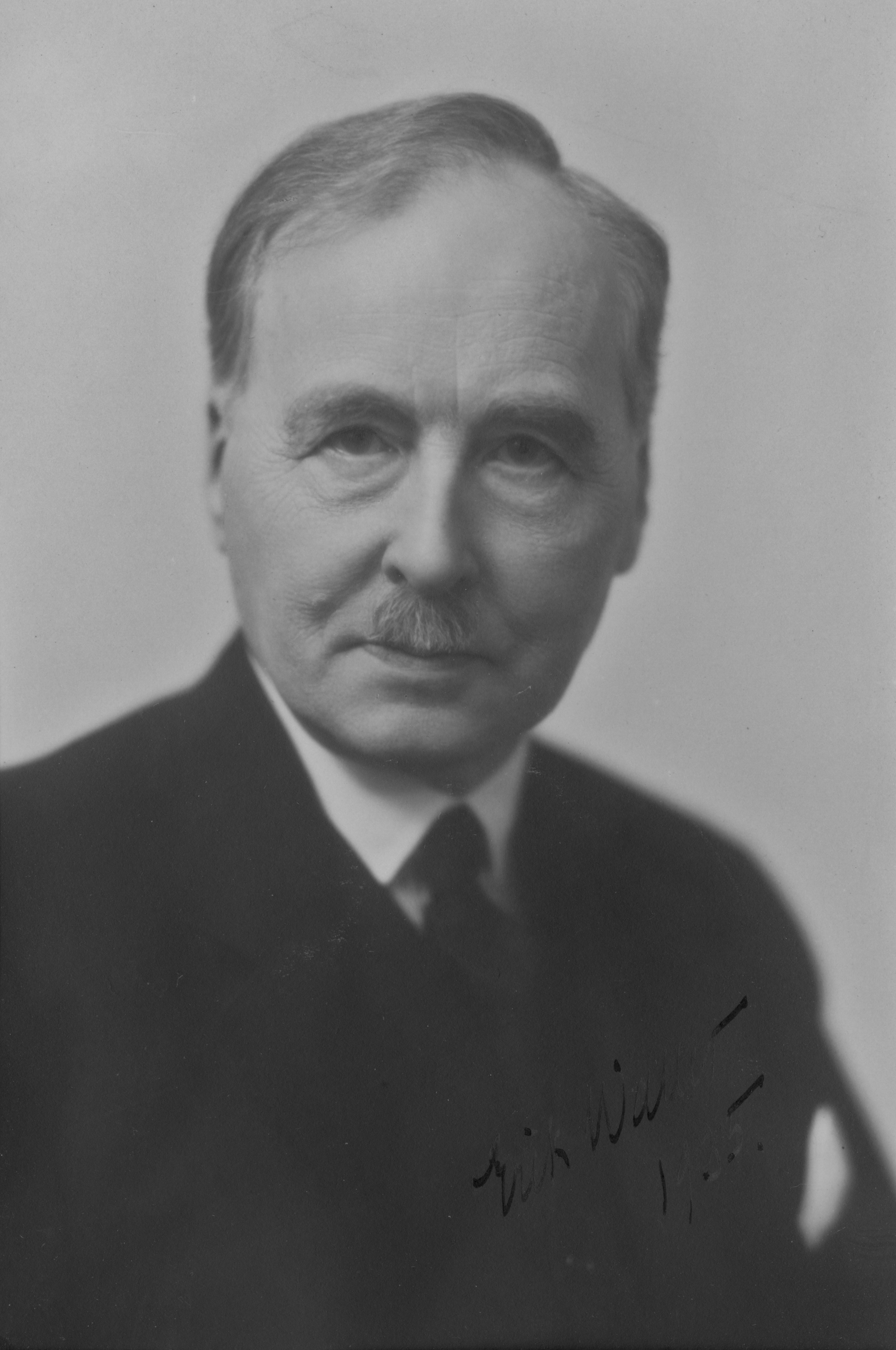
- Erik Waller, 1922.
- Born: 1875
- Died: 1955 (aged 79–80)
- Occupation: surgeon
- Known for: book collection

Erik Waller (1875–1955) was a Swedish surgeon and book collector.

Waller collected some 20,000 important books on science and medicine, including 150 incunabula and other early editions, including a first edition of Andreas Vesalius's De Humani Corporis Fabrica Libri Septem. In his last will and testament he left the whole collection to Uppsala University and its library. A catalogue of the collection was with the greatest competence and care compiled by Hans Sallander and published in two volumes, Uppsala 1955. It includes some fifty plates, reproducing selected interesting items from the collection. Waller's collection of medals relating to the history of medicine is housed by the Uppsala University Coin Cabinet.

== Literature ==
- Bibliotheca Walleriana: the books illustrating the history of medicine and science collected by Dr. Erik Waller, and bequeathed to the Library of the Royal University of Uppsala; a catalogue. Stockholm, 1955.
- Harald Nilsson, Erik Wallers samling av medicinhistoriska medaljer (Studia Numismatica Upsaliensia 8), Uppsala 2013.
