= Örsundsbro =

- Location within Uppsala Location within Sweden
- Coordinates: 59°44′N 17°18′E
- Country: Sweden
- Province: Uppland
- County: Uppsala County
- Municipality: Enköping Municipality

Area
  - Total: 1.38 km^{2} (0.53 sq mi)

Population (31 December 2019)
  - Total: 1,386
  - Density: 1,004/km^{2} (2,600/sq mi)
- Time zone: UTC+1 (CET)
  - Summer (DST): UTC+2 (CEST)

Örsundsbro is a locality situated in Enköping Municipality, Uppsala County, Sweden.

Together with the nearby locality Örsundsbro Norra, the Population reaches 1,953 inhabitants in the whole of Örsundsbro in 2019.
