= Uppsala University Library =

Academic library in Uppsala, Sweden

- Uppsala universitetsbibliotek
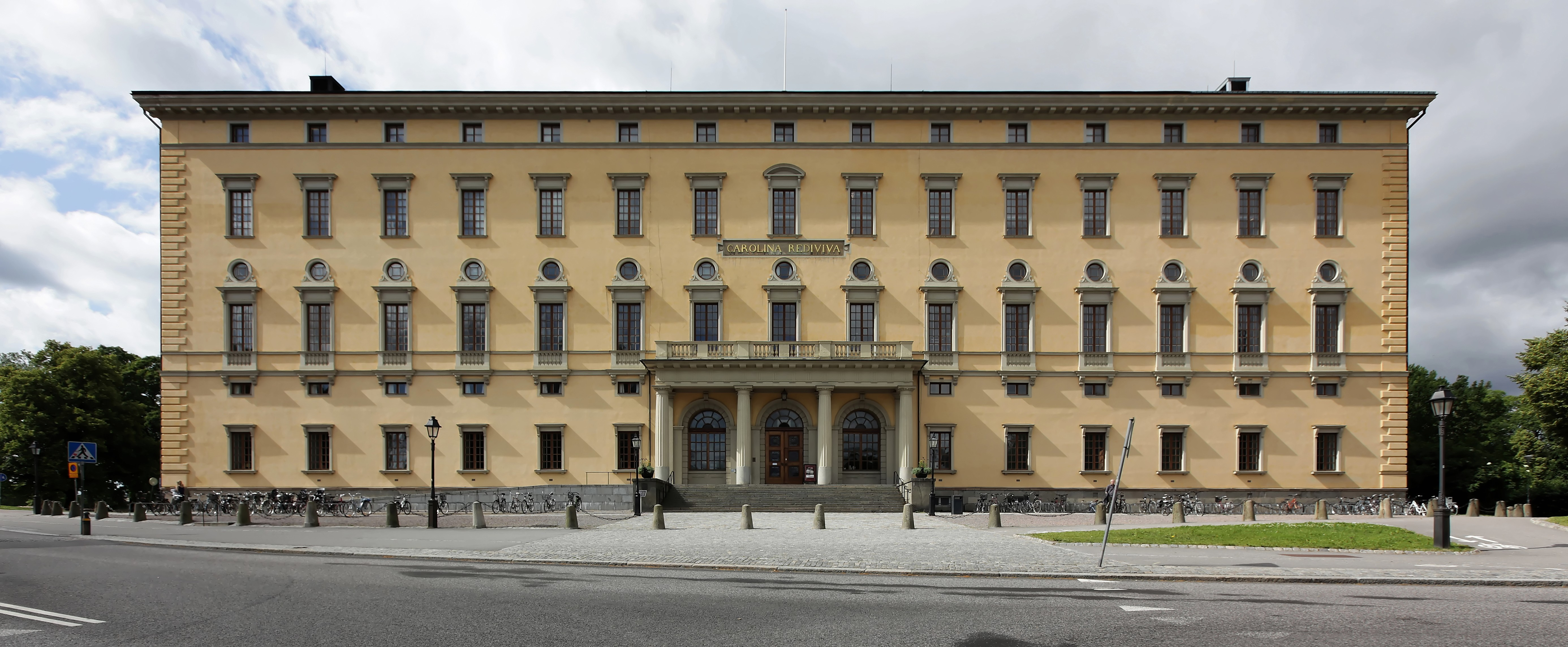
- Carolina Rediviva, one of the library buildings, built 1816–1841 according to the design of Carl Fredrik Sundvall.
- 59°51′21″N 17°37′56″E
- Location: Uppsala, Sweden
- Established: 1620

Other information
- Director: Lars Burman
- Parent organization: Uppsala University
- Website: www.ub.uu.se

The Uppsala University Library (Swedish: Uppsala universitetsbibliotek) at Uppsala University in Uppsala, Sweden, consists of ten libraries, one of which is housed in the old main library building, Carolina Rediviva. The Library holds books and periodicals, manuscripts, musical scores, pictures, and maps.

== History ==
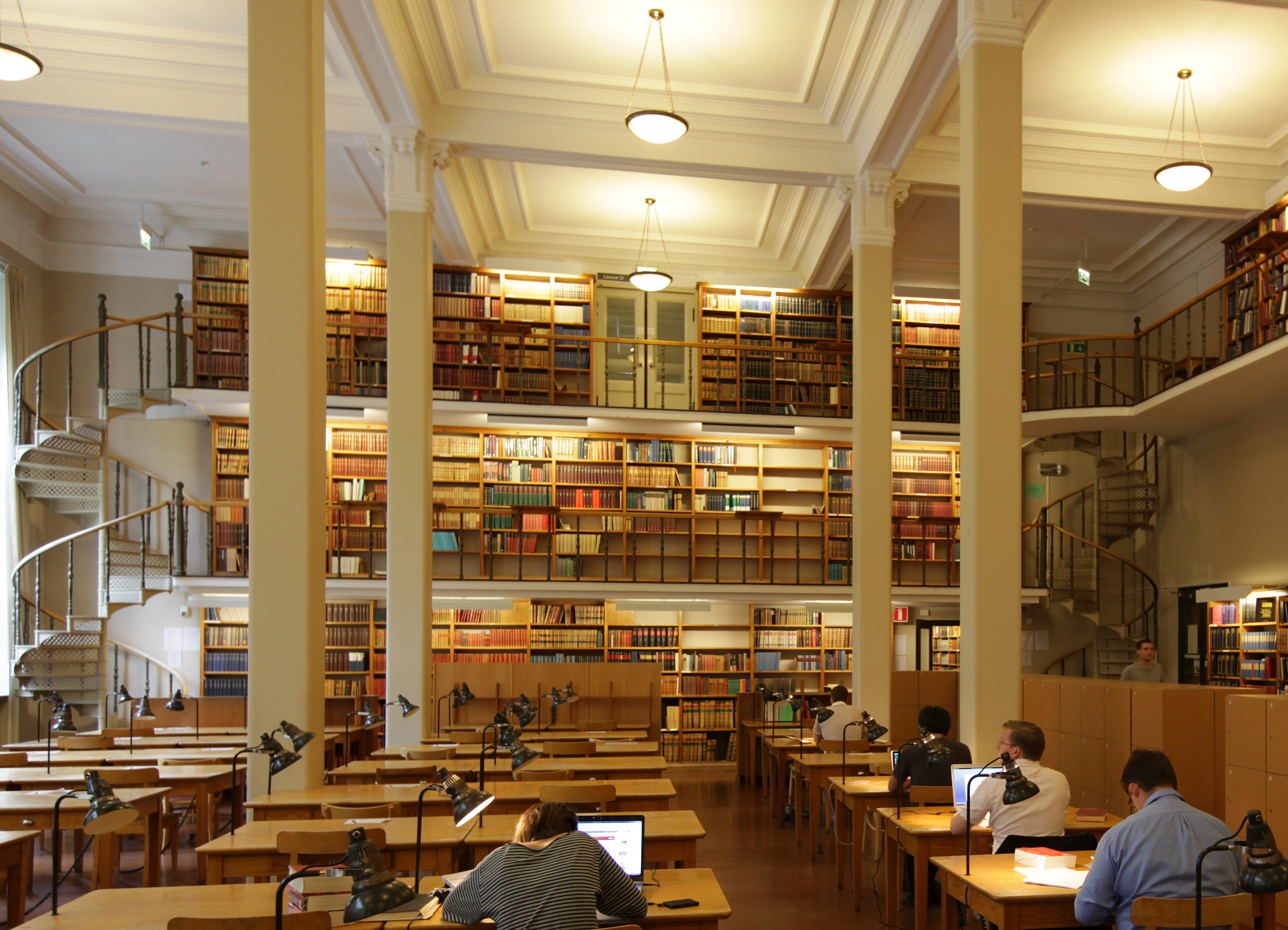
One of the reading rooms at Carolina Rediviva

The exact site of the library during its earliest years is not known, but the university from its foundation in 1477, was located on what became known as "Student Island" in the Fyris River, where the academy mill – now the provincial museum – was later built. In 1566, King Eric XIV donated the old chapter house, south of the Uppsala Cathedral, to be used for lectures. After the construction of the Gustavianum in the 1620s, this building was referred to as the Collegium vetus or Gamla akademien ("the old academy"), until it was renamed in 1704 through a decision of the consistory (university board) and called the Academia Carolina, in honour of kings Charles IX, Charles XI and Charles XII. When a new library building was eventually constructed, it received the name Carolina Rediviva, "the revived Carolina", in honour of the old building, but was located to an entirely different place.

As of approximately 1871, the library contained approximately 200,000 volumes and 8,000 manuscripts, including the Codex Argenteus.

The library remained in Gustavianum, which luckily escaped the flames in 1702, until Carolina Rediviva was completed in 1841. Carolina Rediviva has since retained the status of central library of the university until a reorganization in the 1990s did away with the concept of a centralized library organization and divided the library into a number of branch libraries of equal status, with Carolina being home of one of the branch libraries dedicated to humanities and social sciences. Nevertheless, the central functions of the library system largely remain in the building, as do the special collections units (the Department for manuscripts and music and the Department for maps and prints).

Parallel to the development of the central library, the "seminars" (later called "departments") of the university had their own libraries. Currently, the library's collections are dispersed in the subject libraries. In 2004 most of subject libraries within the Faculties of Arts, Languages and Theology were amalgamated to form the new Karin Boye Library in the English Park Centre for the Humanities, next to the old cemetery.

== Some significant manuscripts and collections ==
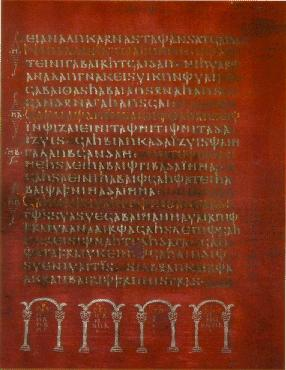
The Codex Argenteus

The university library of Uppsala was mainly created through the large donations in the early 17th century of confiscated libraries from monasteries, especially that in Vadstena and the Greyfriars Friary, Stockholm, (including the books donated to it by Kanutus Johannis), and the important collection of Baron Hogenskild Bielke who had been executed in 1605, and whose library was confiscated by the crown and donated by Gustav Adolph in 1621.

In 1669, the University Library received the Codex Upsaliensis, one of the four main manuscripts of the Prose Edda.

The many wars in which Sweden took a part in the 17th century brought many important manuscripts and collections to Sweden as spoils of war, some of which eventually ended up in Uppsala. (For example, in 1626 Swedish looted from the Polish Kolegium Jezuitów w Braniewie some 1300 books and manuscripts). The most famous example is the Codex Argenteus (the "Silver Bible"), most of what remains of Bishop Ulfilas's translation of the New Testament into Gothic, which was looted in Prague. Another example is the Copernicana, the main part of the library of astronomer Nicolaus Copernicus, looted by the Swedish Army in Kraków. The so-called Emperor's Bible was lost when Swedish troops occupied Goslar in Germany, and eventually also ended up in Uppsala University Library.

Later donations and purchases include many archives and collections of various Swedish families and individuals, such as the personal papers of King Gustav III, which were left to the library, to be opened only 50 years after the King's death.

More recently acquired collections include the Bibliotheca Walleriana and the Waller manuscript collection, collected by Dr Erik Waller, and partly donated, partly purchased by the library. It is one of the largest libraries of books concerned with the history of science and medicine, and a manuscript collection mostly of letters from notable scientists. The manuscript collection is in the process of being scanned and published on the web.

The Bodoni collection is the largest collection of prints of Giambattista Bodoni (1740–1813) outside his native Parma. It was donated by the industrialist Erik Kempe in 1959 and later extended with funds donated at the same time.

The music collections includes the Düben collection which was accumulated from 1640 until 1718 by the Düben family, a German family of musicians which included a number of members serving as Hofkapellmeister of the royal court orchestra. It contains a large selection of 17th-century music, notably important works by Buxtehude not elsewhere preserved. The Düben collection has been catalogued and is in the process of being scanned and published on the web: https://www2.musik.uu.se/duben/Duben.php

Other music collections are those from the manors of Leufsta and Gimo, the collection of Hugo Alfvén, that of the Joseph Martin Kraus, and the various collections that have been taken as spoils of war, such as the Cancionero de Uppsala, a 16th-century collection of Spanish music printed in Venice 1556 and not preserved in any other copy.

== Current organization ==
The library is headed by a Library Director, the head librarian (at the moment Johanna Hansson).

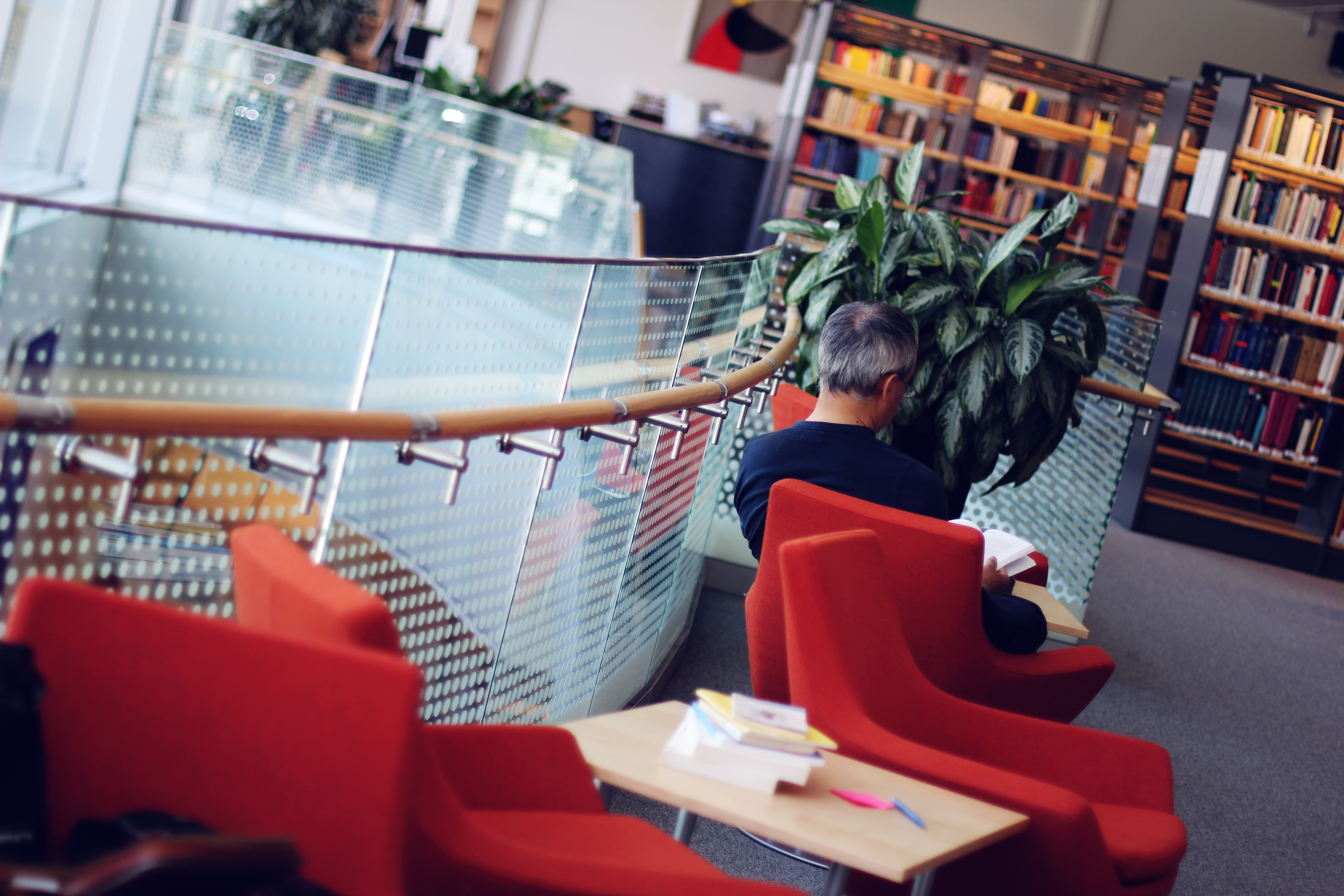
Blåsenhus Library – One of the ten campus libraries.

=== Libraries ===
- Almedalen Library (Gotland)
- Biology Library
- Bio-Medical Library
- Blåsenhus Library
- Carolina Rediviva
- Dag Hammarskjöld and Law Library. (Named after the UN Secretary General Dag Hammarskjöld.)
- Earth Sciences Library
- Karin Boye Library. (Named after the writer Karin Boye.)
- Library for Economic Sciences
- Ångström Library. (In the Ångström Laboratory and named after Anders Jonas Ångström and his son Knut Ångström.)

=== Special Collections Division ===
- Early Printed Books and Special Collections
- Manuscripts and music
- Maps and Pictures
- Preservation

== See also ==
- List of libraries in Sweden
