= Carolina Rediviva =

Main building of the Uppsala University Library

Coordinates: 59°51′17.94″N 17°37′52.05″E

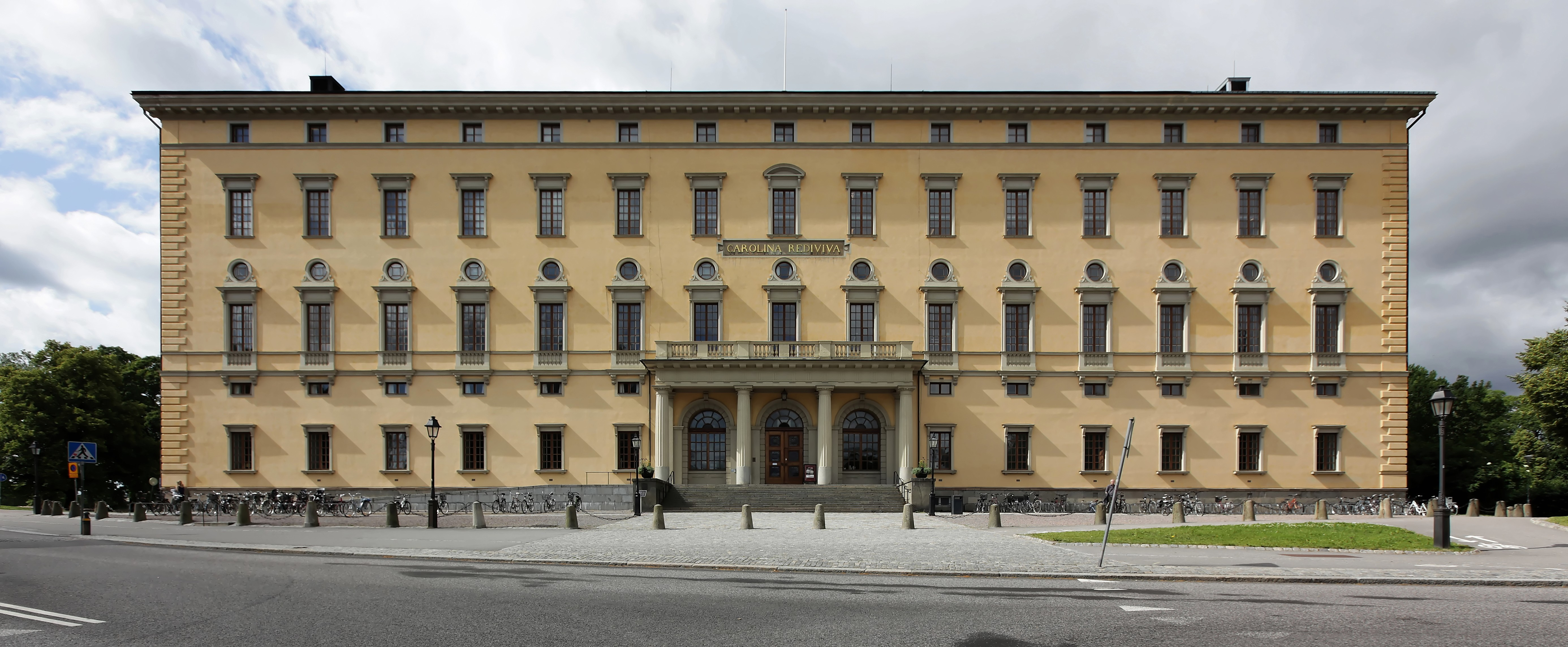
Carolina Rediviva

Carolina Rediviva is a part of Uppsala University Library in Uppsala, Sweden. The building was begun in 1820 and completed in 1841. The original architect was Carl Fredrik Sundvall. Later additions to the building were designed by Axel Johan Anderberg and Peter Celsing. The name, literally "Carolina Revived", was given in remembrance of the old Academia Carolina building, which had functioned as the university library for most of the 18th century (see Uppsala University Library). Carolina Rediviva is the oldest and largest university library building in the country. It is also the site where the Codex Argenteus and the Cancionero de Upsala are kept.

== Exhibition ==
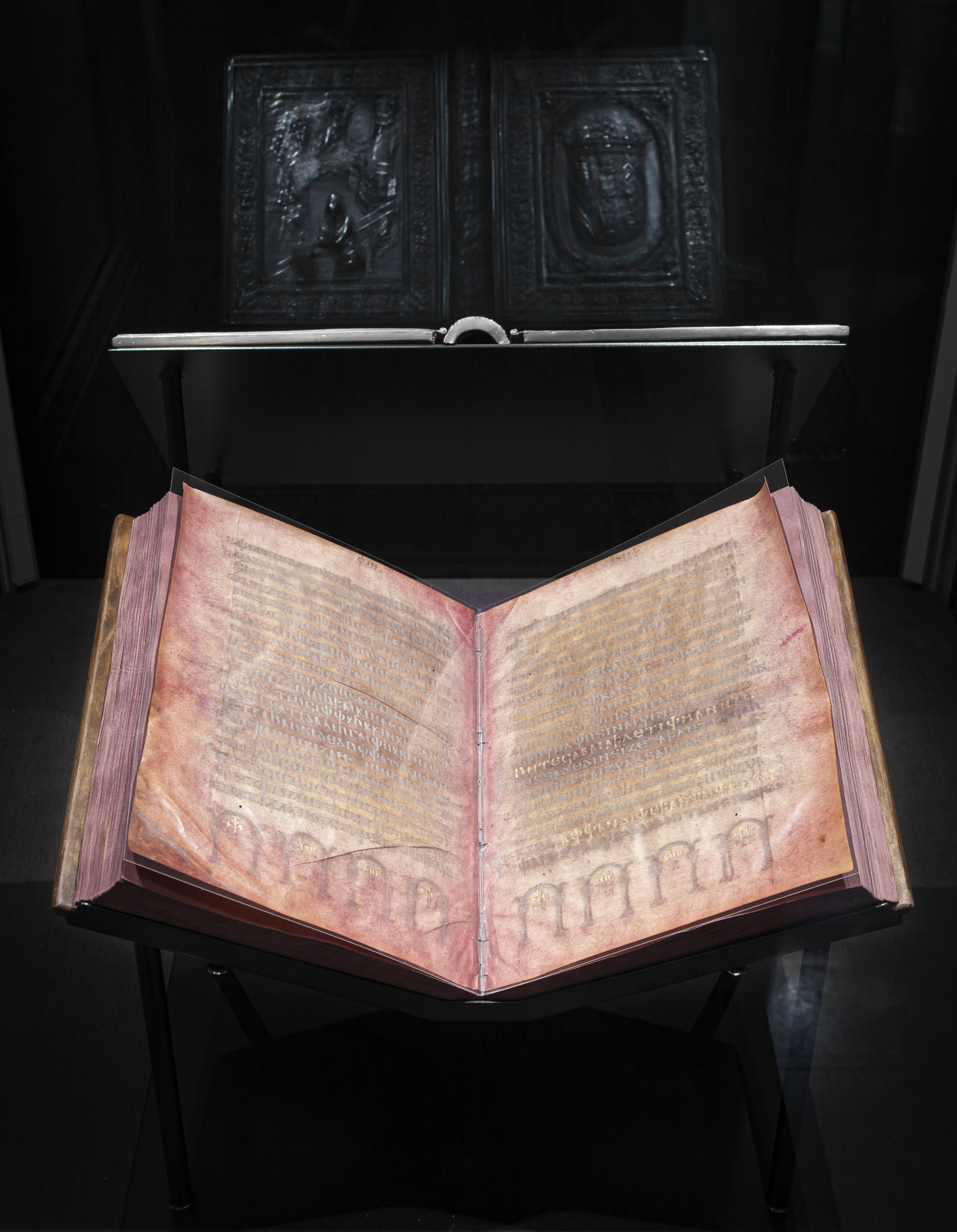
Codex Argenteus on display at Carolina Rediviva.

By the entrance hall of the library there is an exhibition hall where some of the most important objects in the library can be seen. Among the items are the Codex Argenteus and the map Carta marina.

== Gallery ==
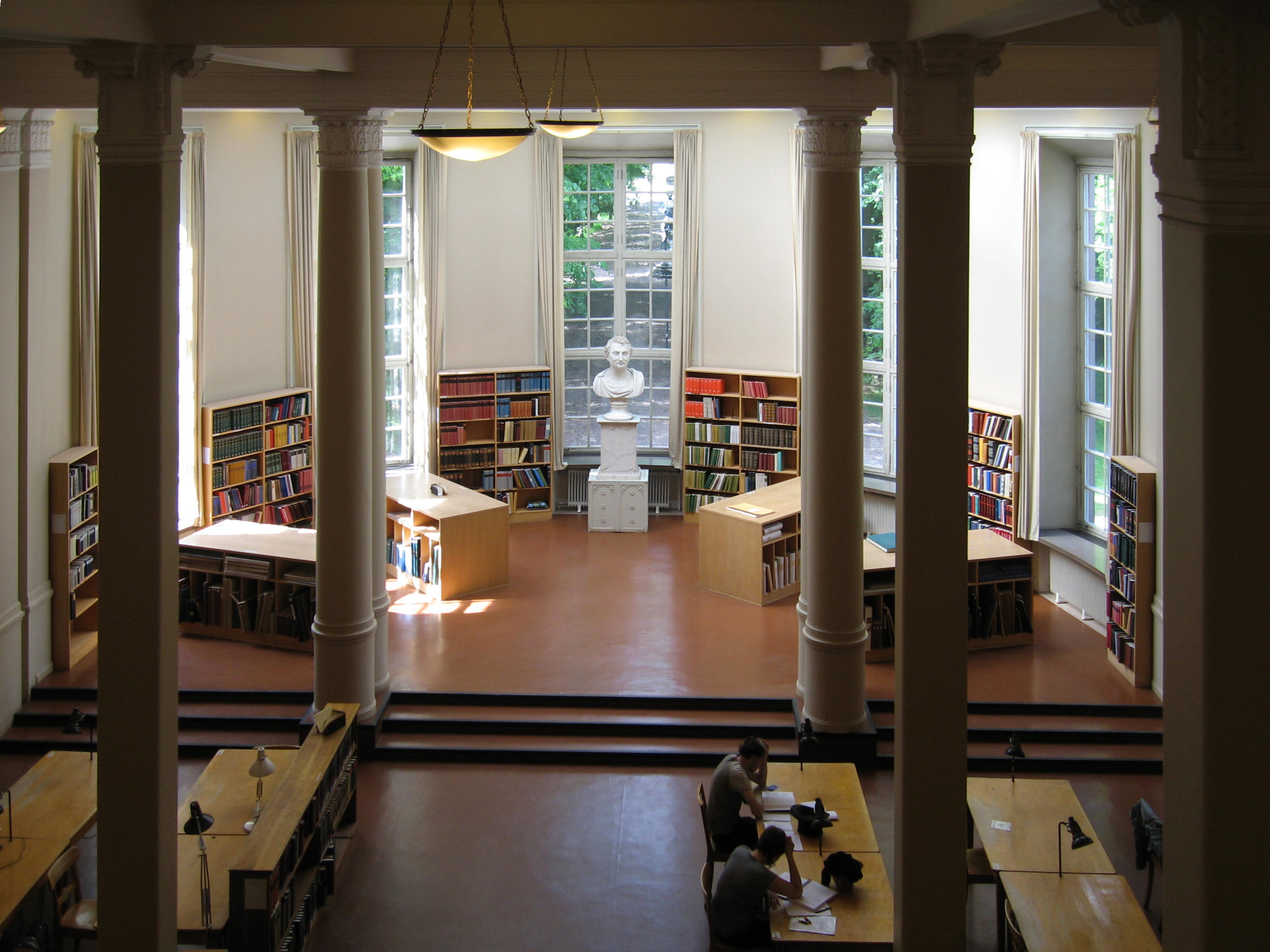
Reading Room A, western view.

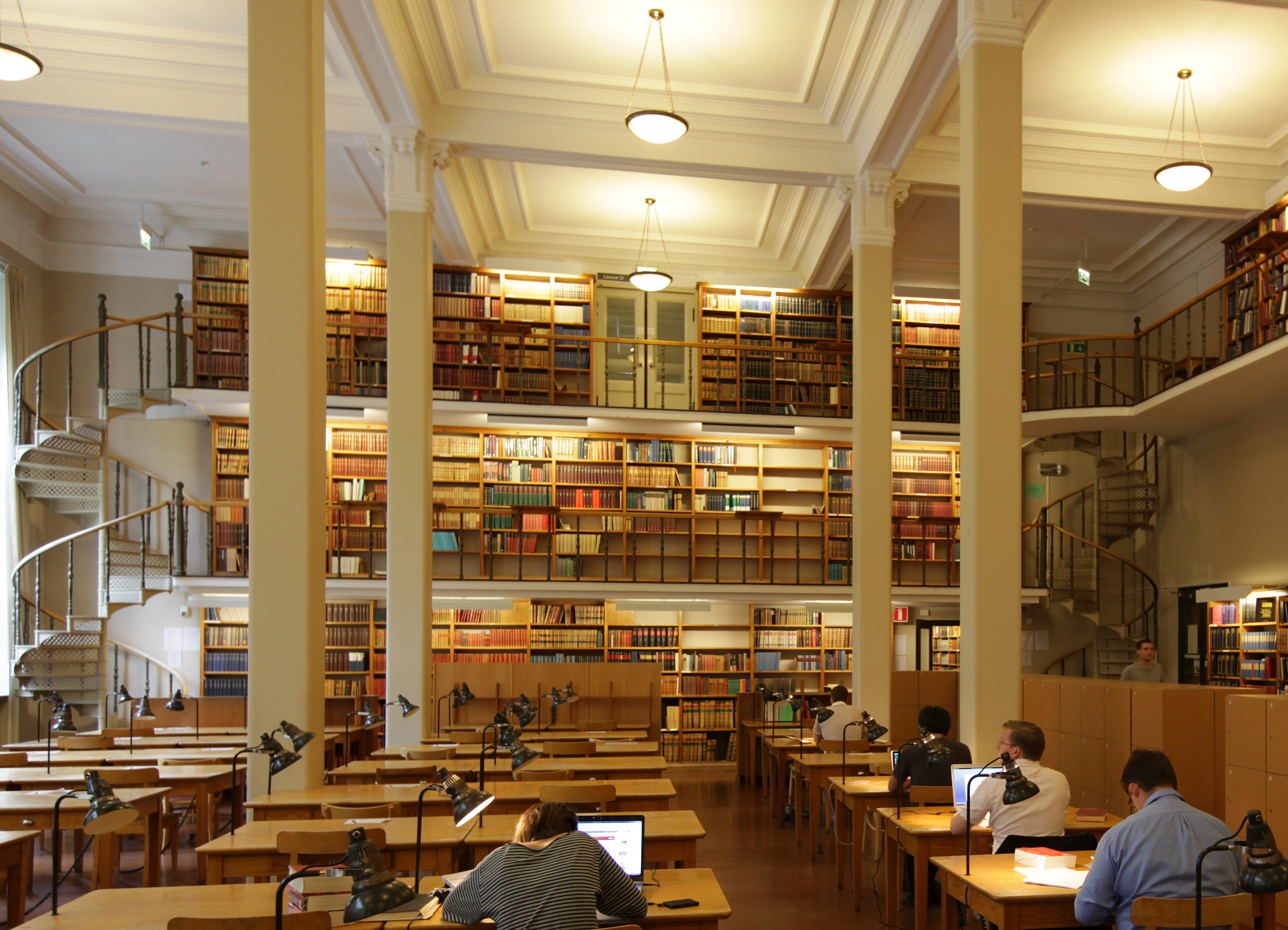
Reading room A, northern wall.

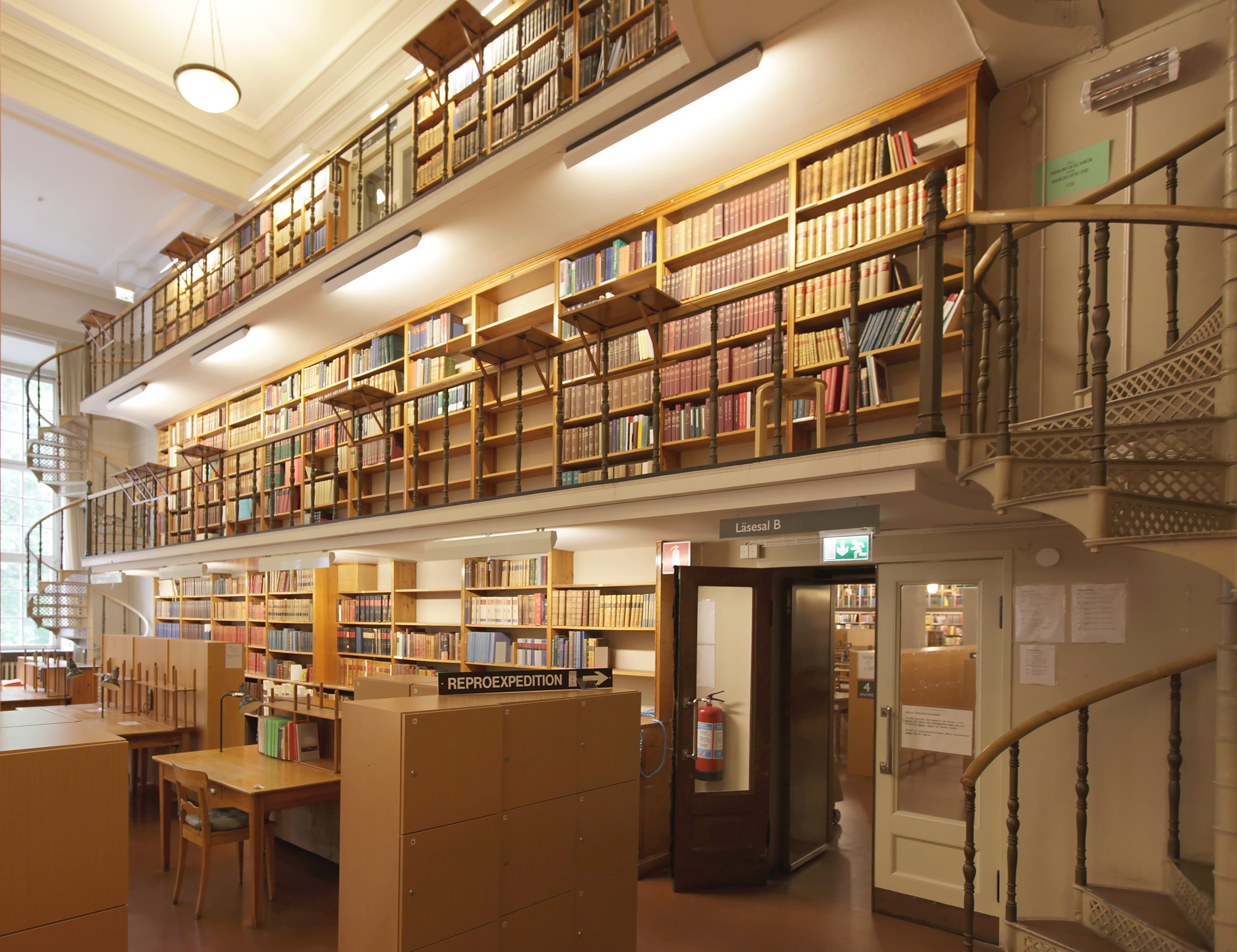
Reading room A, eastern wall.

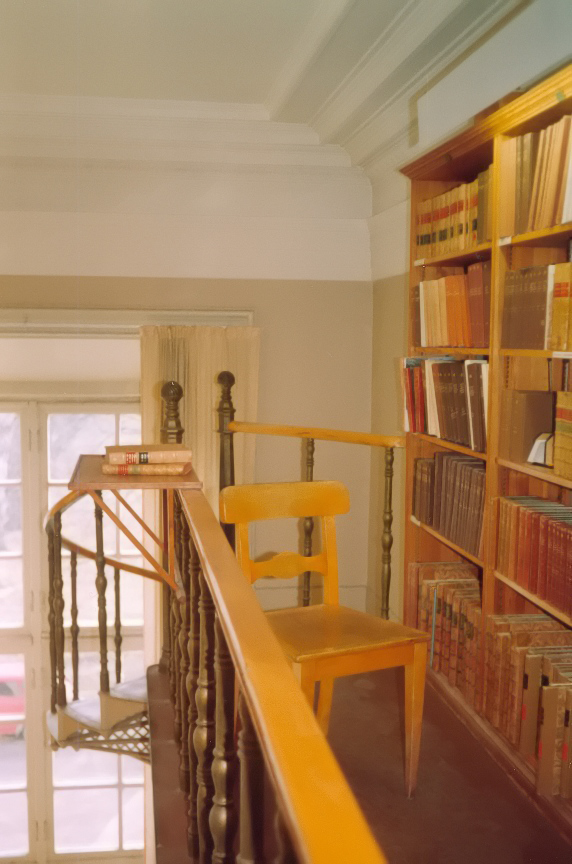
Reading room A, balustrade northern wall.

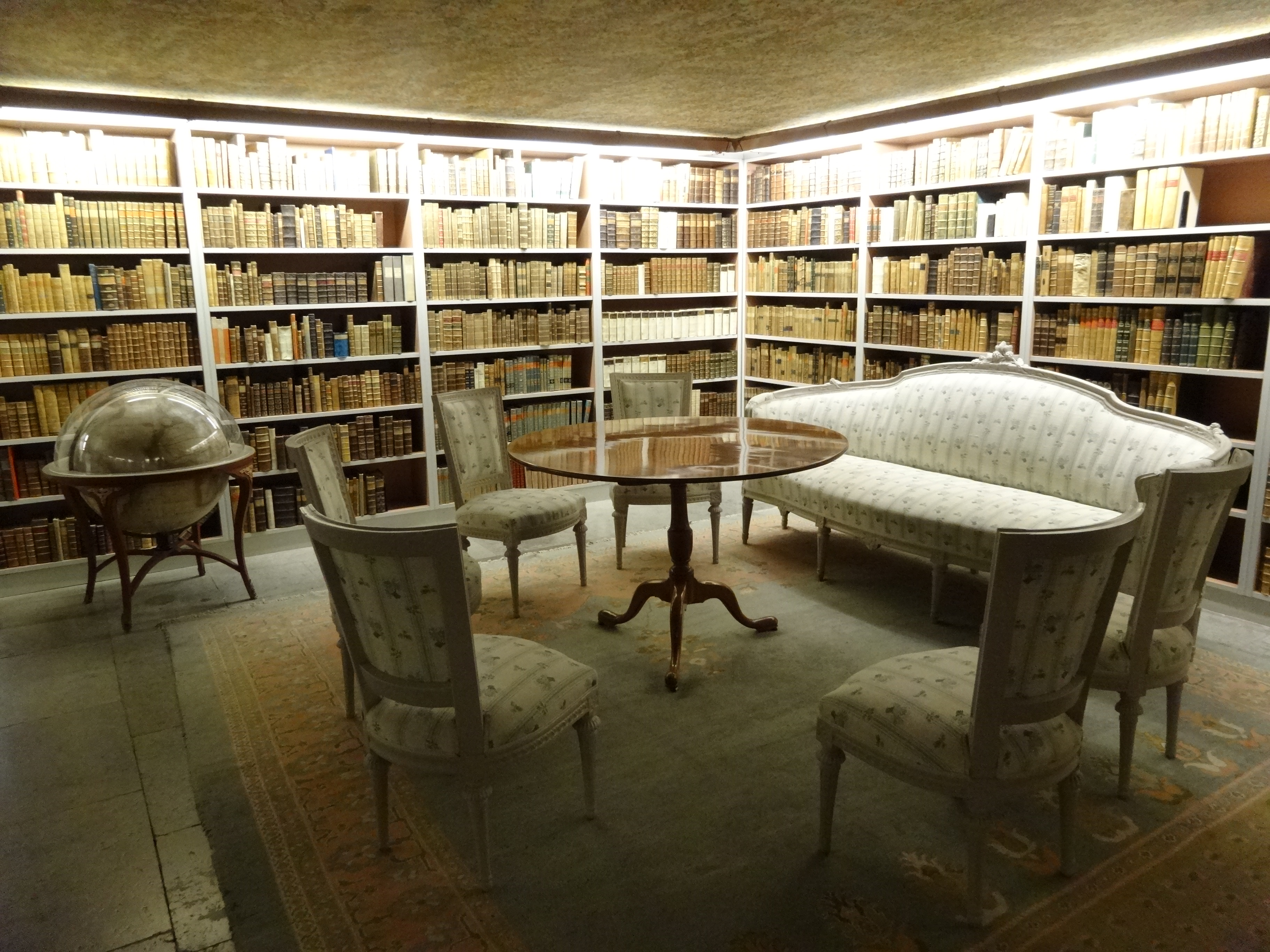

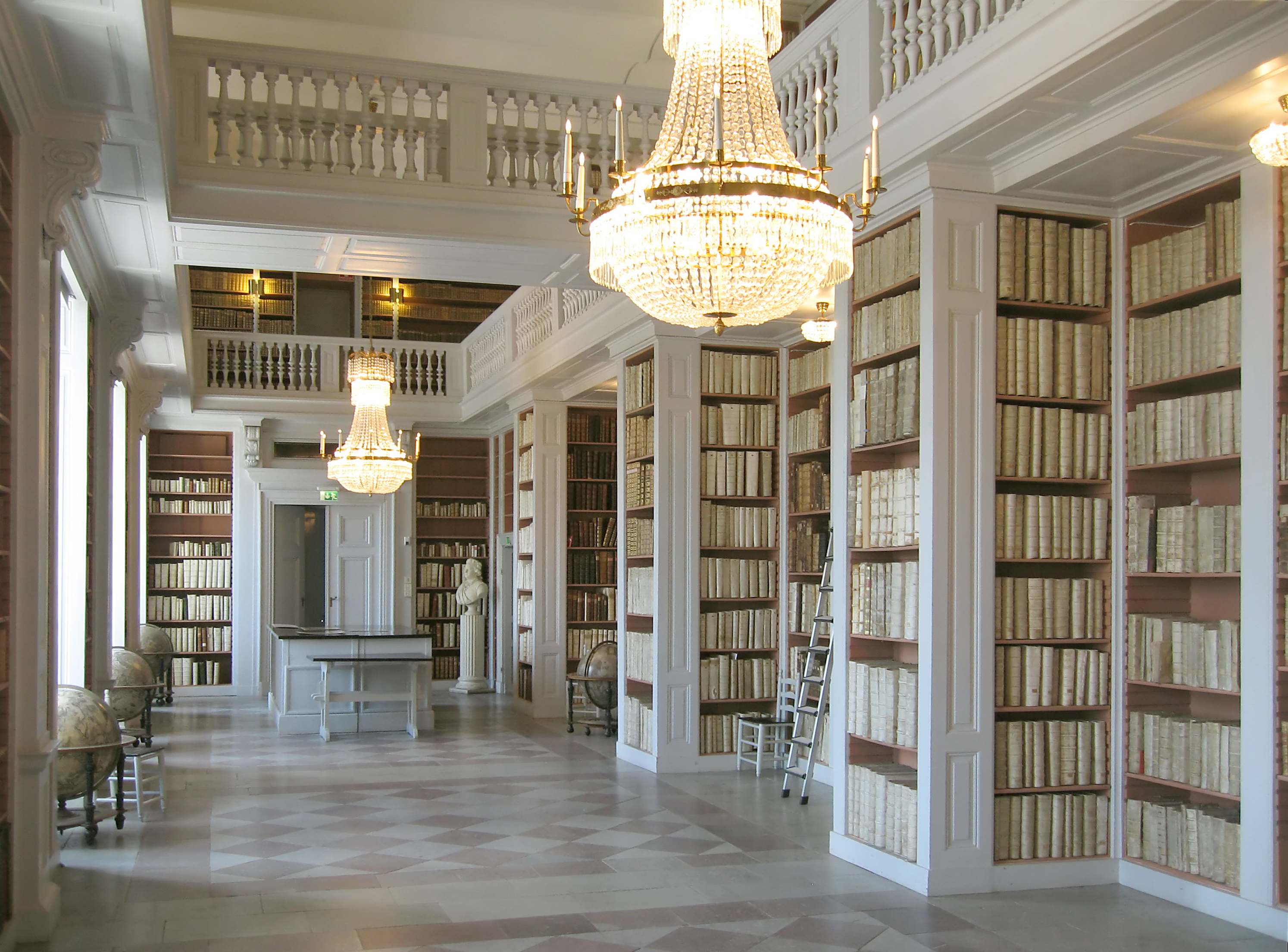
The Book Hall.

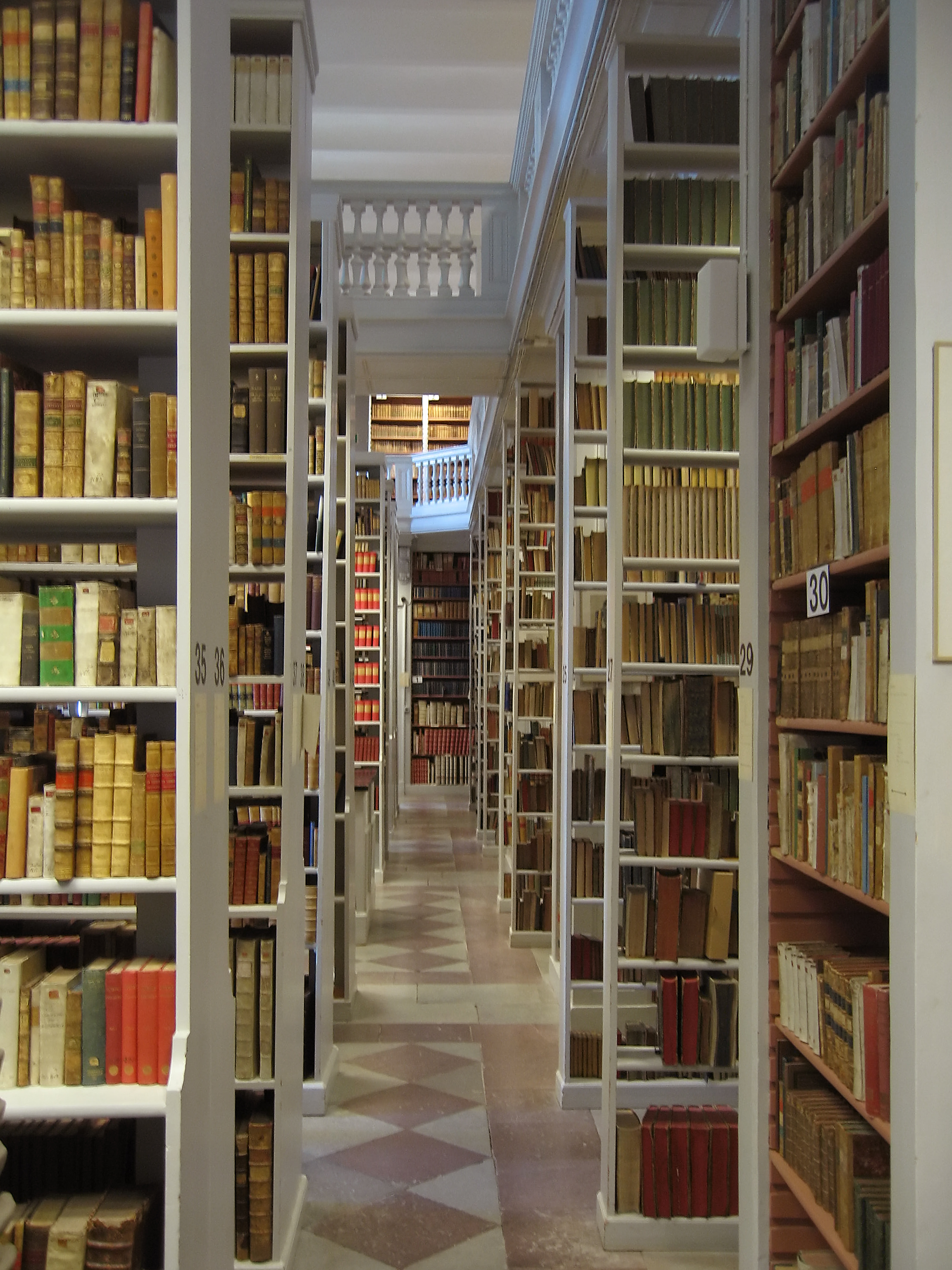
Closed stacks.

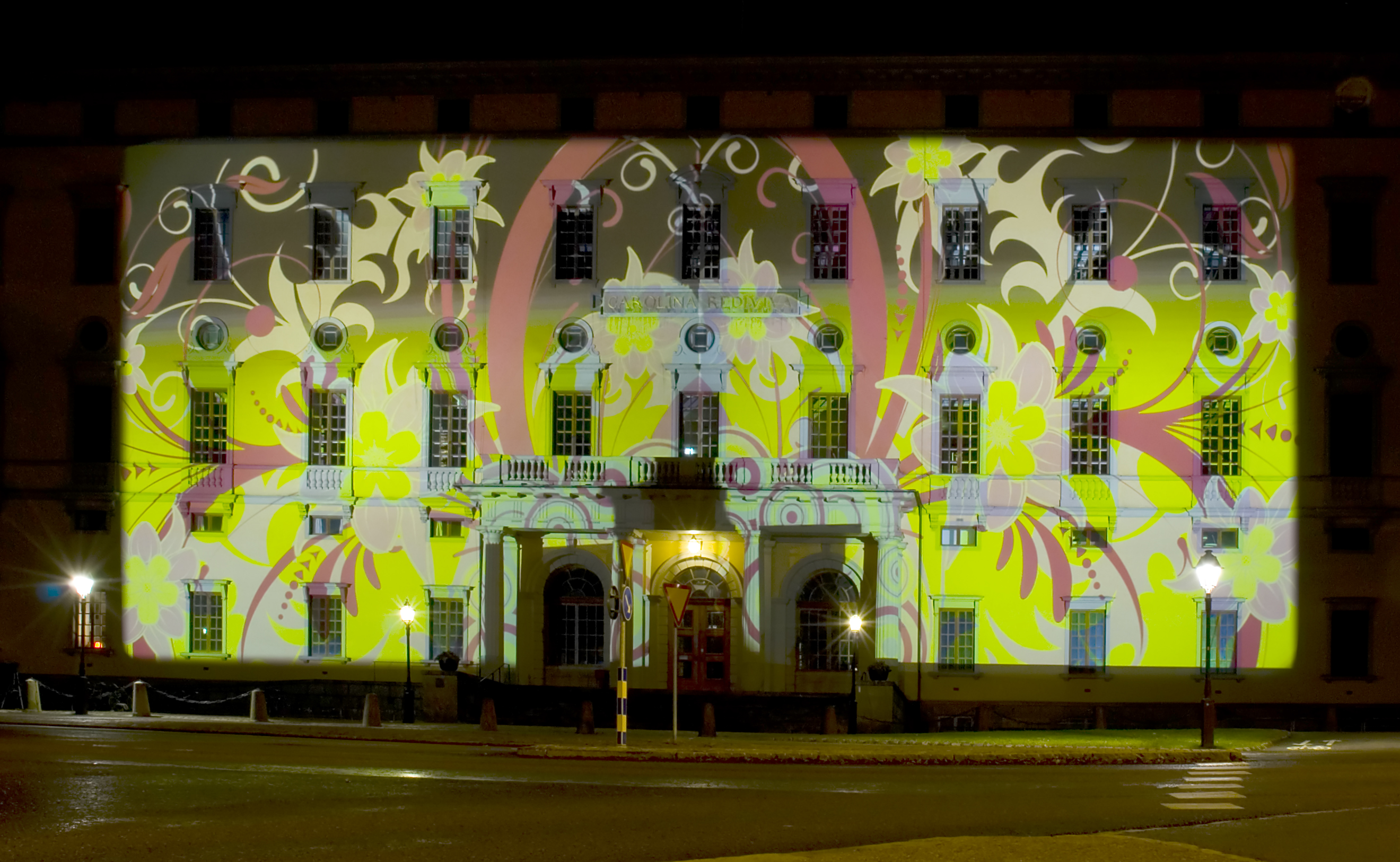
Carolina Rediviva during the light-festival Allt ljus på Uppsala in 2008

== See also ==
- Uppsala University Library
- List of libraries in Sweden
