= Enköping Municipality =

Enköping Municipality Enköpings kommun
- Municipality
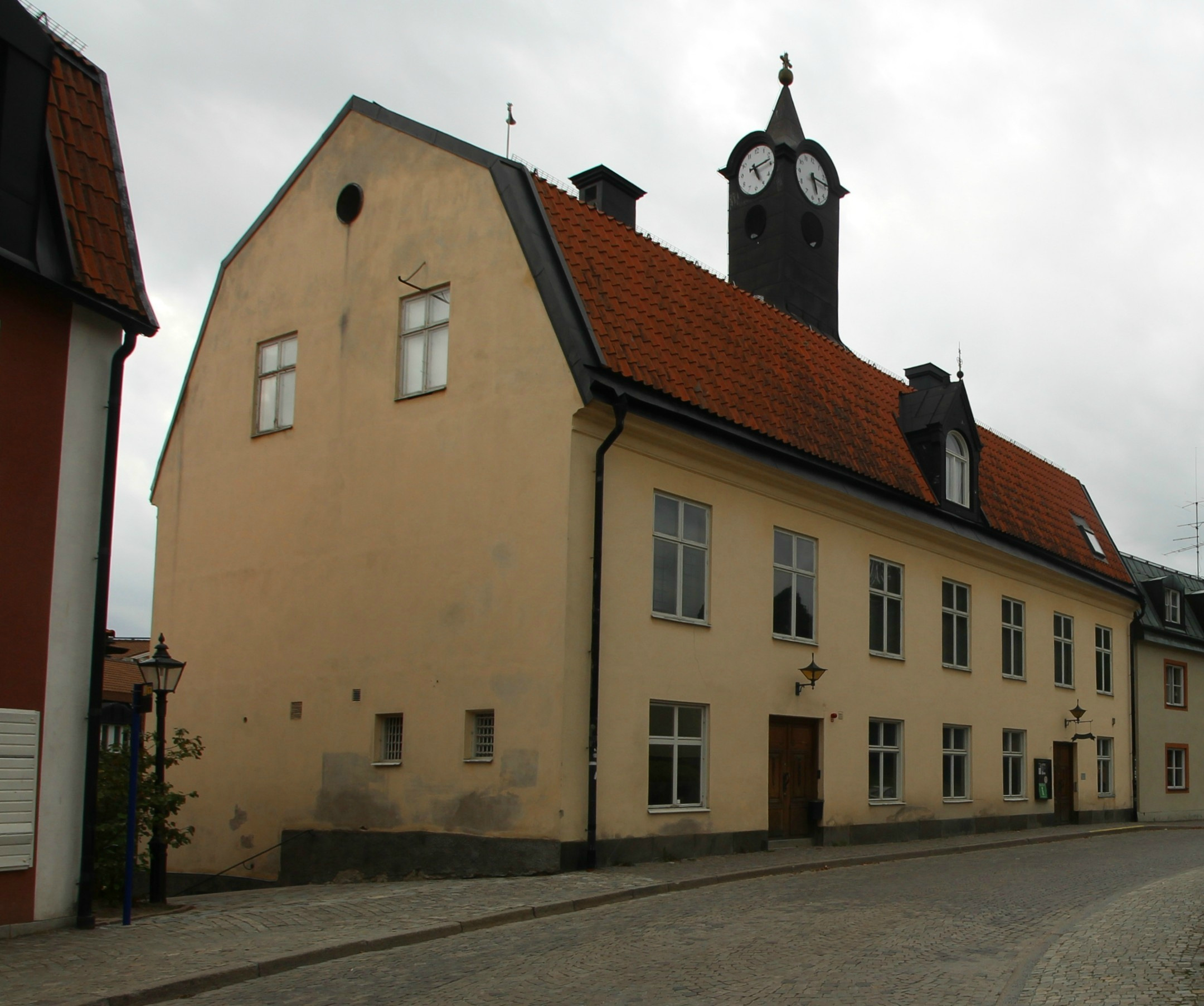
- Enköping Town Hall

- Coat of arms

- Coordinates: 59°38′N 17°05′E
- Country: Sweden
- County: Uppsala County
- Seat: Enköping

Area
  - Total: 1,323.82 km^{2} (511.13 sq mi)
  - Land: 1,178.5 km^{2} (455.0 sq mi)
  - Water: 145.32 km^{2} (56.11 sq mi)
- Area as of 1 January 2014.

Population (30 June 2025)
  - Total: 48,764
  - Density: 41.378/km^{2} (107.17/sq mi)
- Time zone: UTC+1 (CET)
  - Summer (DST): UTC+2 (CEST)
- ISO 3166 code: SE
- Province: Uppland
- Municipal code: 0381
- Website: www.enkoping.se

Enköping Municipality (Swedish: Enköpings kommun) is a municipality in Uppsala County in east central Sweden. Its seat is located in the city of Enköping.

The present municipality consists of nearly forty original local government units. They were grouped into greater municipalities in 1952 and Enköping Municipality was created in 1971 when the City of Enköping was amalgamated with five surrounding units.

== Localities ==
- Enköping (seat)
- Örsundsbro
- Fjärdhundra
- Grillby
- Hjälstaby
- Hummelsta
- Lillkyrka
- Bredsand

== Demographics ==
This is a demographic table based on Enköping Municipality's electoral districts in the 2022 Swedish general election sourced from SVT's election platform, in turn taken from SCB official statistics.

In total there were 34,998 Swedish citizens of voting age resident in the municipality. 42.2% voted for the left coalition and 56.4% for the right coalition. Indicators are in percentage points except population totals and income.

Location	Residents	Citizen adults	Left vote	Right vote	Employed	Swedish parents	Foreign heritage	Income SEK	Degree
Location			%	%					
Bergvreten	2,214	1,594	45.3	53.7	86	83	17	27,738	42
Bredsand	1,879	1,341	33.9	65.4	90	85	15	33,585	49
Enögla	2,101	1,441	50.1	48.1	69	57	43	19,652	28
Fanna	1,887	1,523	43.4	55.7	87	84	16	28,953	43
Fjärdhundra	1,977	1,482	37.9	60.8	83	85	15	24,640	27
Grillby	2,115	1,579	36.4	62.2	86	85	15	28,387	33
Gånsta	1,869	1,343	41.8	57.4	87	87	13	31,116	47
Hummelsta	1,930	1,447	38.2	61.1	85	85	15	27,179	31
Korsängen	2,207	1,344	52.6	45.3	71	55	45	21,831	31
Kryddgården	1,851	1,692	44.7	54.2	82	84	16	22,872	34
Lillkyrka	2,268	1,760	37.6	61.5	86	90	10	28,016	36
Munksundet	2,335	1,851	44.1	54.9	86	85	15	28,570	38
Romberga	2,394	1,507	53.5	41.5	67	48	52	19,172	27
S:t Ilian N	2,127	1,748	41.7	56.6	81	78	22	25,809	35
S:t Ilian S	1,664	1,407	44.4	54.4	77	77	23	22,253	29
Skolsta	1,792	1,380	33.1	66.3	85	88	12	28,533	32
Sparrsätra	1,458	1,123	35.1	64.2	88	90	10	28,165	38
Svinnegarn	1,524	1,138	38.4	60.0	88	89	11	30,905	44
Torstuna	1,754	1,363	38.6	60.1	86	91	9	27,334	31
Västerleden N	1,882	1,278	49.3	48.5	75	60	40	22,406	28
Västerleden S	2,288	1,353	54.7	41.0	69	43	57	20,294	28
Åkersberg	1,413	972	41.4	57.3	86	80	20	29,027	41
Örsundsbro V	2,135	1,618	39.5	59.2	87	89	11	27,719	39
Örsundsbro Ö	2,327	1,714	40.9	57.5	86	89	11	27,683	35
Source: SVT

== Sister cities ==
- Kaarina, Finland
- Ølstykke, Denmark (about to change due to the upcoming major municipality changes in Denmark)
- Nedre Eiker, Norway
- Jõgeva, Estonia
- Santa Rosa, Philippines

(Source:)

== Sports ==
The most successful sports team of the city has for several years been the football team Enköpings SK, with one peak season in the Swedish Premier Division (Allsvenskan) in 2003. Unfortunately, the team has now faced the harsh reality of sports and economics and will be playing in Division 2 in 2008. Their home arena is called Enavallen and is situated in downtown Enköping.
