= Ångström (disambiguation) =

The angstrom is a unit of length equal to 0.1 nanometre, also spelled ångström (lower case).

Ångström or Angstrom may also refer to:

== People ==
- Anders Jonas Ångström (1814–1874), Swedish physicist
- Anders Knutsson Ångström (1888–1981), Swedish physicist and meteorologist
- Lars Ångström, Swedish Green Party politician and member of the Riksdag
- Yvonne Ångström, Swedish Liberal People's Party politician

== Other ==
- 42487 Ångström, main-belt asteroid
- Angstrom, a radio comedy series starring Matthew Holness
- Angstrom (company), a variant spelling for the name of a group of Russian companies
- Ångström (crater), lunar crater
- Ångström distribution, Linux distribution for embedded devices
- Angstrom exponent or Ångström exponent, an exponent used to describe the dependency of the aerosol optical thickness
- Angstrom Levy, a comic-book supervillain in the Image Comics series Invincible
- Angstrom Medica, a former name of Pioneer Surgical Technology
- Rabbit Angstrom, character in John Updike's Rabbit series
- Ångström Laboratory, a facility of Uppsala University

== See also ==
- Angstrom star, a unit of length equal to 1.000 014 98(90) angstrom
- Angstrem (disambiguation) (Russian: Ангстрем), a Russian variant of transcription for Ångström (Angstrom)
