= Ångström Laboratory =

Engineering and natural science facility of Uppsala University

The Ångström Laboratory
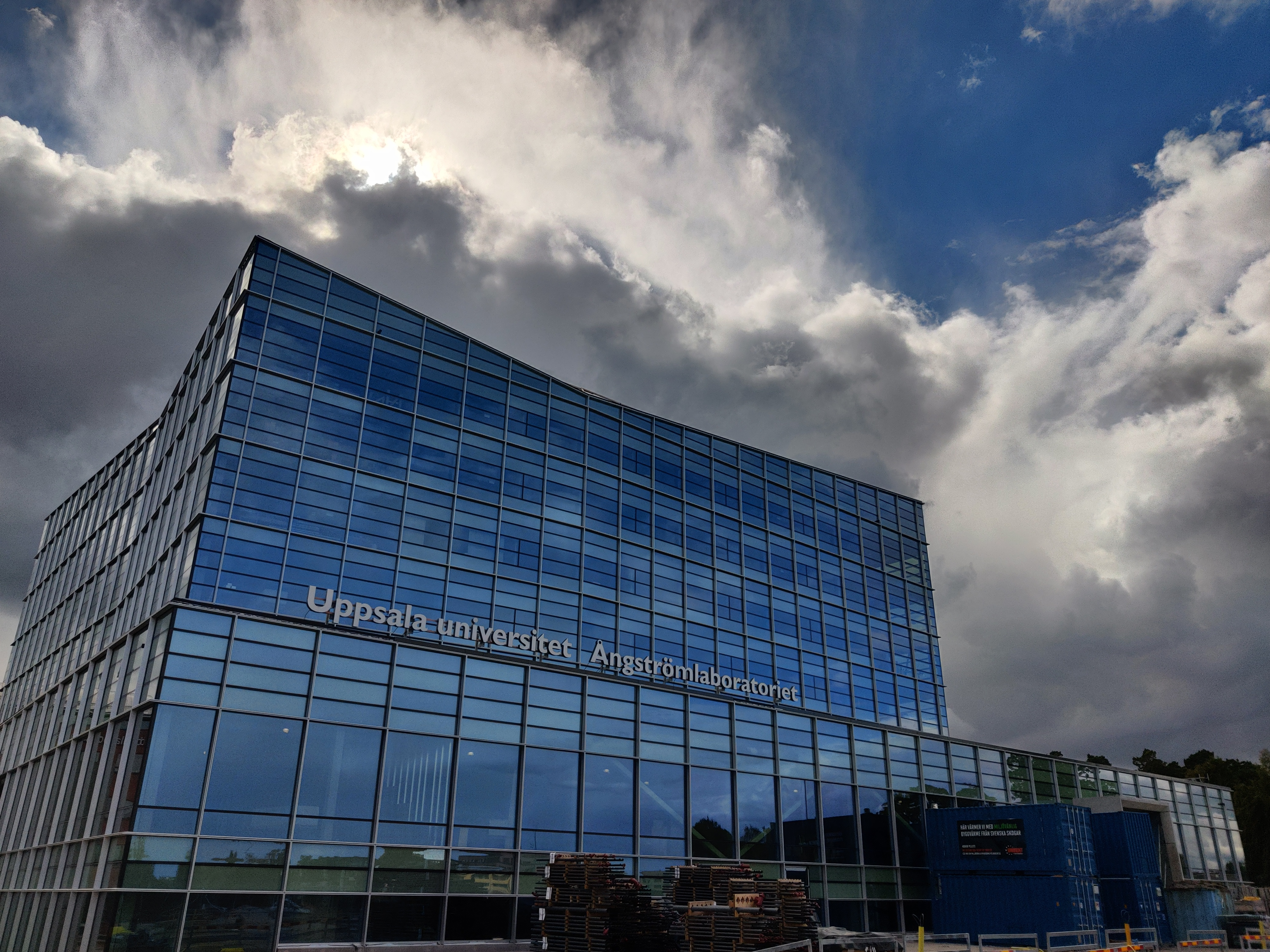
- House 10 of the Ångström Laboratory, pictured 13 May 2022
- Location: Regementsvägen 10, Uppsala, 75237, Sweden; 59.83837°N 17.64761°E
- Affiliations: Uppsala University
- Nobel laureates: Kai Siegbahn
- Website: www.angstrom.uu.se
- Location of Ångström in Uppsala

The Ångström Laboratory (Swedish: Ångströmslaboratoriet) is a facility of Uppsala University. It hosts multiple research laboratories and departments of mathematics, computer science, natural science and engineering.

== History ==
The facility is named after Swedish physicist Anders Jonas Ångström and his son Knut Ångström, both of whom were professors at Uppsala University in the 19th century. It was first inaugurated in 1997, at Polacksbacken, next to a site that historically served the purpose of training the Uppland Regiment from 1680 to 1912. This site later evolved to house the university's Information Technology Centre (ITC).

Ångström was erected south-west of the regiment site, initially primarily to accommodate a cleanroom. This first construction is referred to as stage 1, including buildings 1, 2, 3, 4, 5. In year 2000, stage 2 was realized, including buildings 6 and 8. Building 7 was realized in 2006, and in 2013 the FREIA laboratory was constructed between buildings 5 and 7.

=== New Ångström ===
The Ångström Laboratory initially consisted of eight buildings. However a new building 9 was completed in September 2020. Then, finally on 13 May 2022 the new front building 10 was inaugurated by the Crown Princess of Sweden Victoria. Together these two new houses form the so-called "New Ångström".

This New Ångström (houses 9 and 10) was built and funded by Akademiska Hus, a Swedish state-owned enterprise. In 2018 the enterpreise reported that they had invested 1.2 billion SEK towards the project.

== Departments ==
The represented departments at Ångström Laboratory include:

- The Department of Physics and Astronomy
- The Department of Information Technology
- The Department of Chemistry – Ångström
- The Department of Mathematics
- The Department of Electrical Engineering
- The Department of Materials Science and Engineering
- The Department of Civil and Industrial Engineering

Much of the Technical and natural science faculty of Uppsala University is at Ångström.

== Research laboratories ==
Multiple research laboratories are housed in Ångström, some listed below:

- Westerlund telescope (part of the Uppsala Astronomical Observatory), situated on top of one of the south buildings.
- Ångström Advanced Battery Centre
- FREIA Laboratory (Facility for Research Instrumentation and Accelerator Development)
- Tandem Laboratory

== Gallery ==
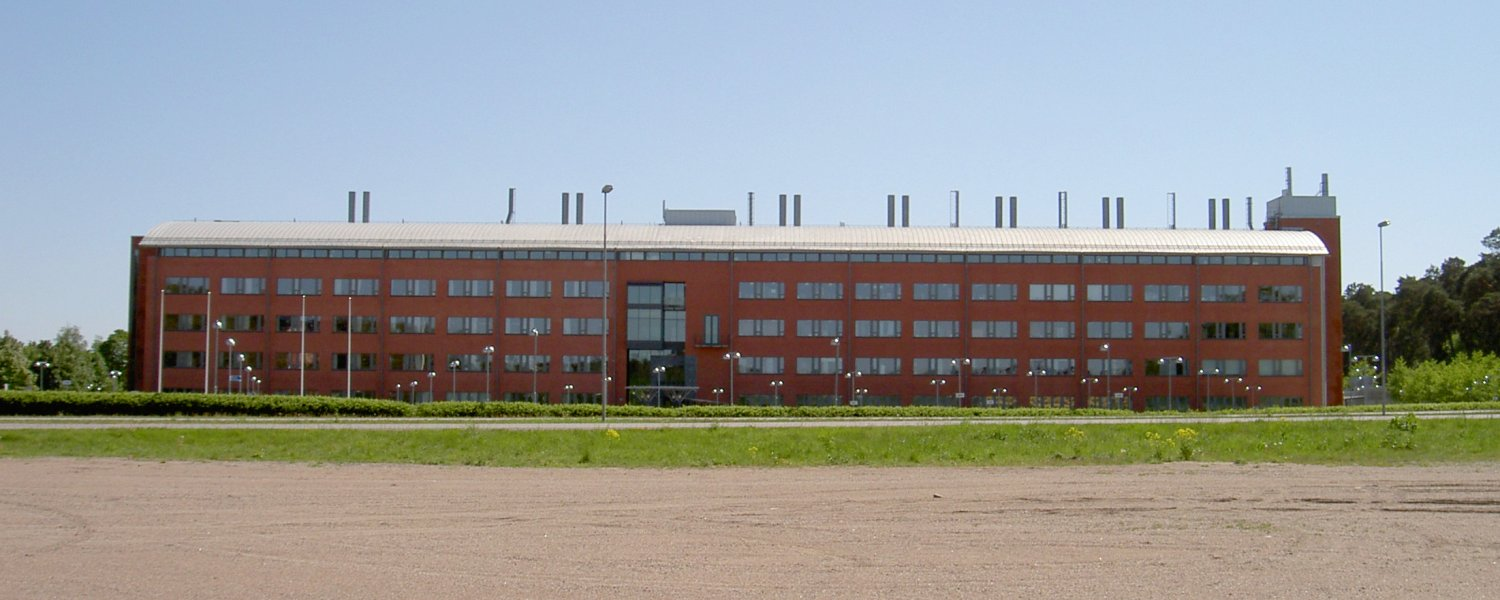
Ångströmlaboratoriet 2007

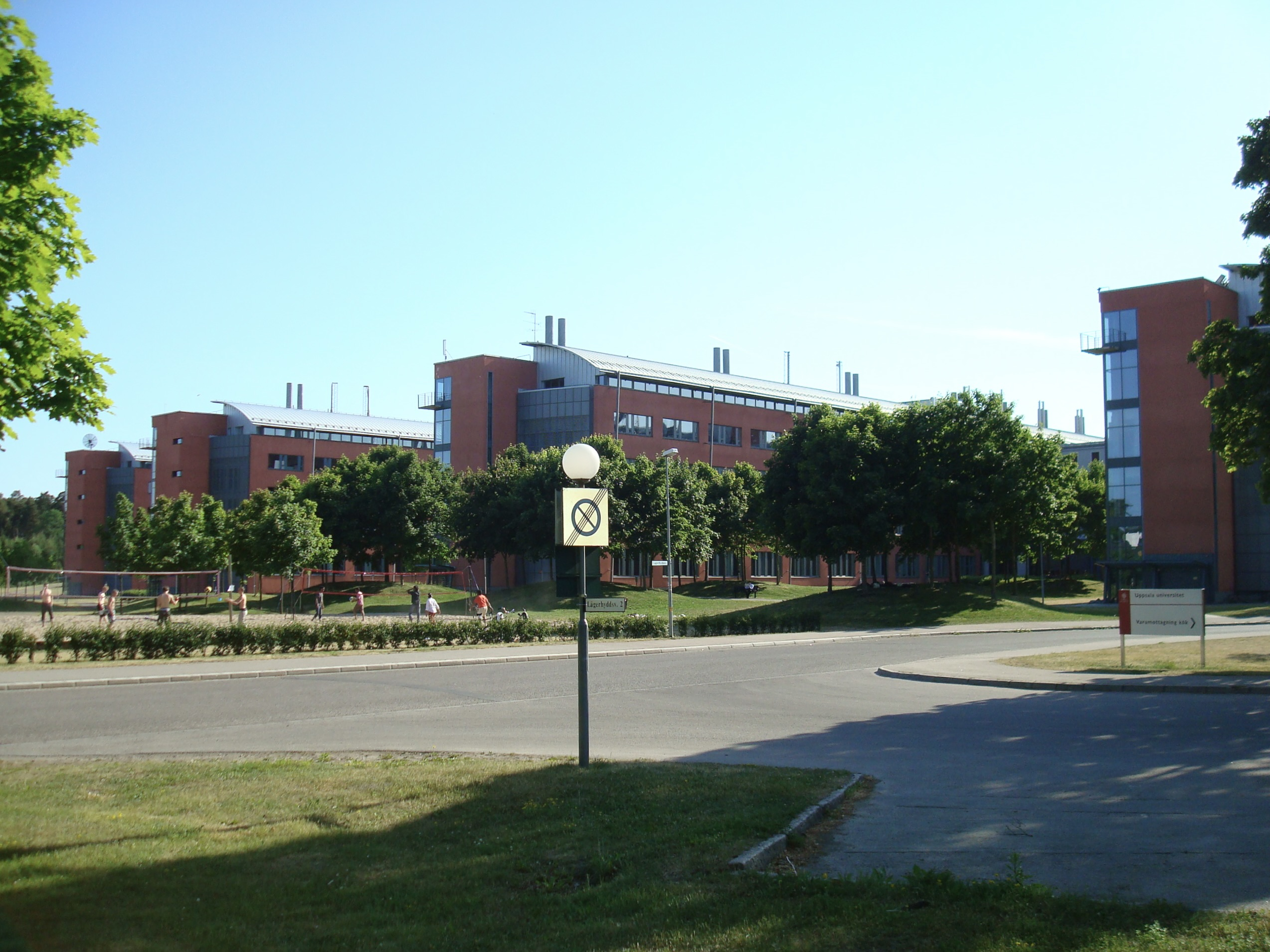
Flygelhusen 2008

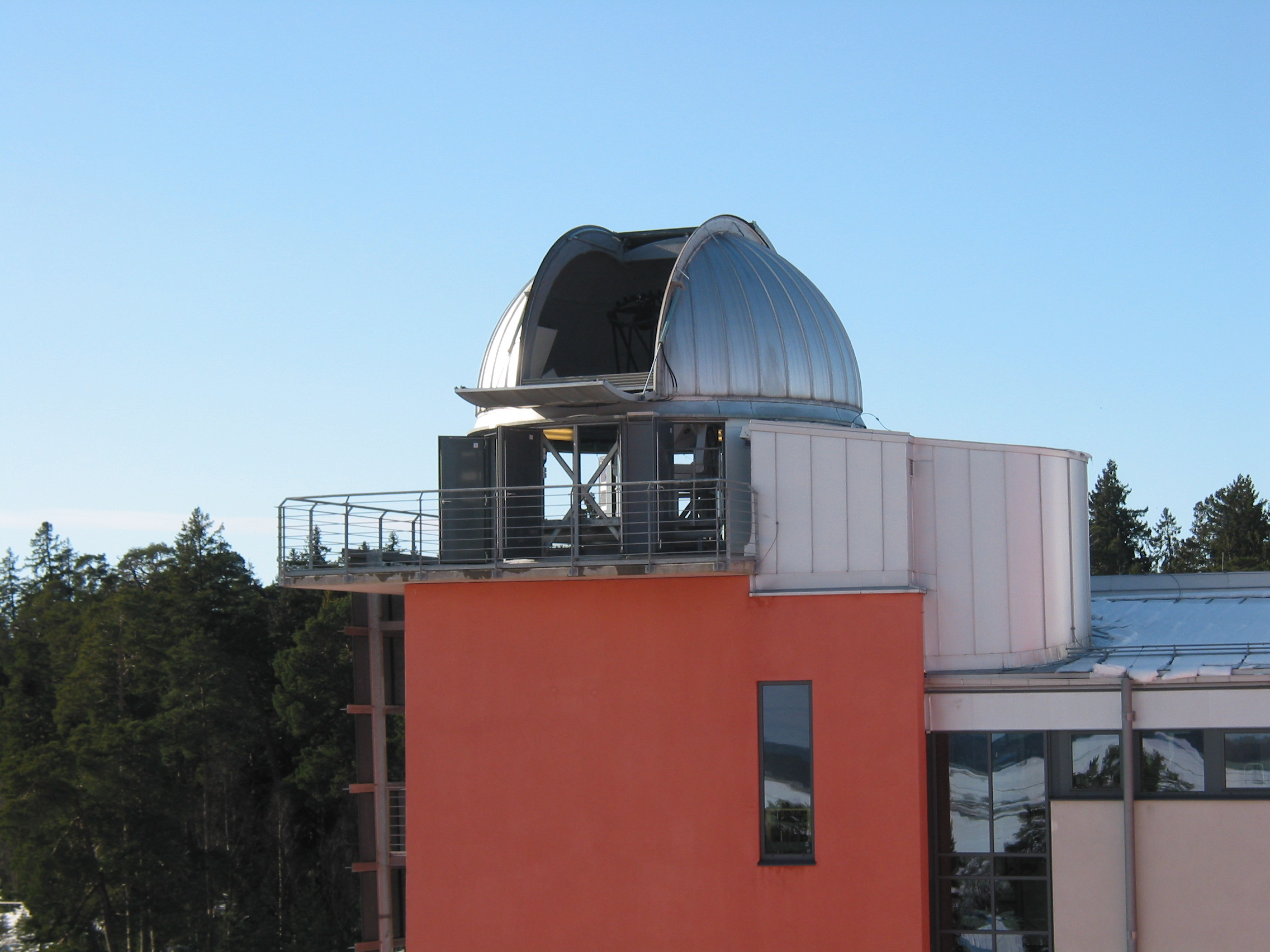
Westerlundteleskopet 2009

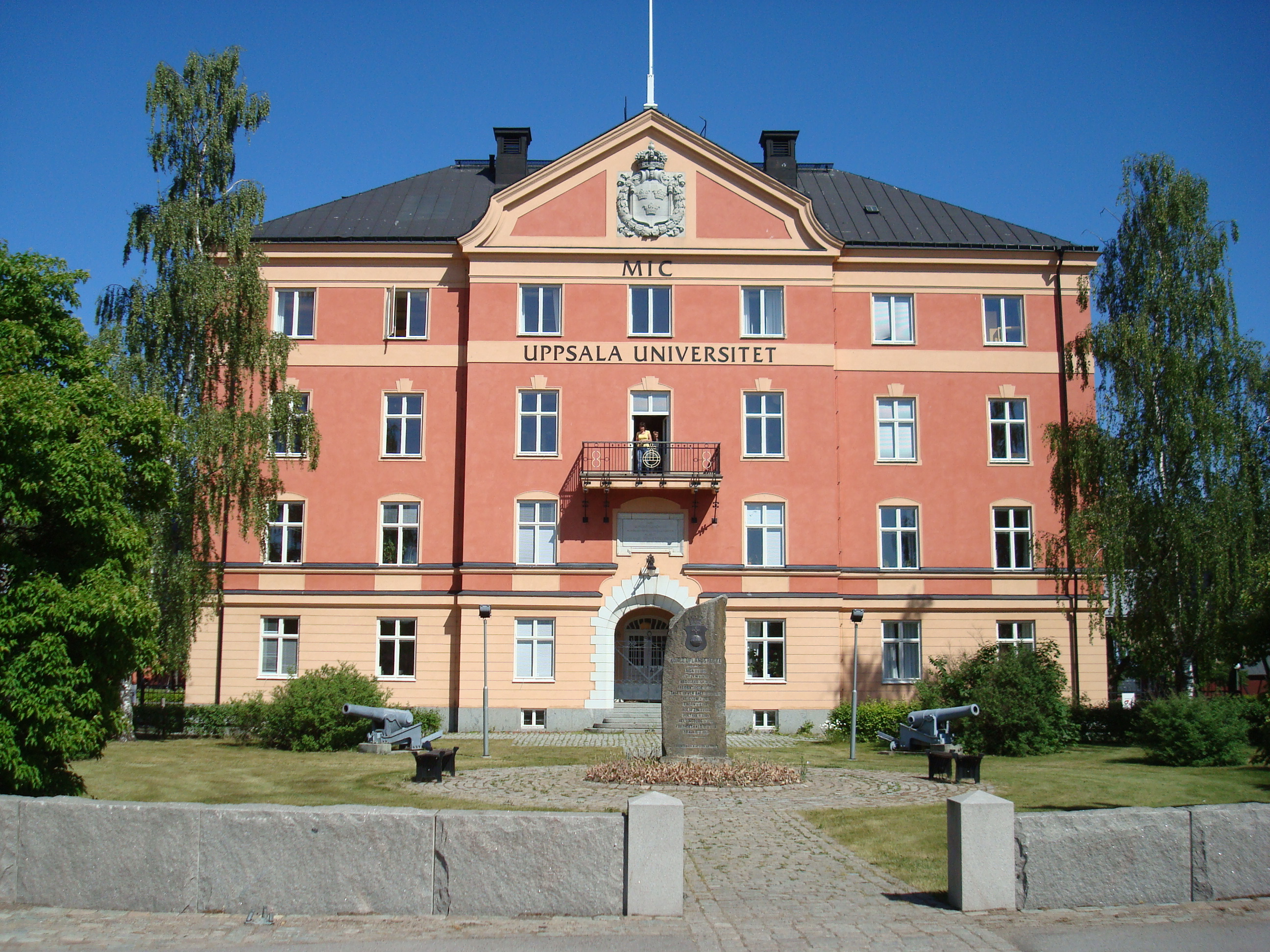
Polacksbacken

== Spin-off companies ==
The Ångström Laboratory has been the source of multiple spin-off companies, some listed below:

- Peafowl Plasmonics, plasmonic solar cells
- Altris, sodium-ion battery manufacturer
- Disruptive Materials AB, which make Upsalite
- Vertical Wind AB, vertical-axis wind turbines
- ChromoGenics AB, photochromic materials

== See also ==
- The Svedberg Laboratory
- Gustavianum
- Carolina Rediviva
