= Runaway greenhouse effect =

Climatic effect causing a planet's atmosphere to trap heat and prevent cooling

A runaway greenhouse effect occurs when a planet's atmosphere contains greenhouse gas in an amount sufficient to block thermal radiation from leaving the planet, preventing the planet from cooling and from having liquid water on its surface. A runaway version of the greenhouse effect can be defined by a limit on a planet's outgoing longwave radiation, which is asymptotically reached due to higher surface temperatures evaporating water into the atmosphere, increasing its optical depth. This positive feedback loop means the planet cannot cool down through longwave radiation (via the Stefan–Boltzmann law) and continues to heat up until it can radiate outside of the absorption bands of the water vapour.

The runaway greenhouse effect is often formulated with water vapour as the condensable species. The water vapour reaches the stratosphere and escapes into space via hydrodynamic escape, resulting in a desiccated planet. This likely happened in the early history of Venus.

A 2012 study on climate change indicated that "Earth presently absorbs around 240 W m^{−2} of solar radiation. Increasing carbon dioxide concentration will make surface warmer with the same outgoing thermal flux. Following this theory, we are not near the threshold of a runaway greenhouse. However, the behaviour of hot, water-vapour-rich atmospheres is poorly understood, and an in-depth study of these is necessary."

However, the authors cautioned that "our understanding of the dynamics, thermodynamics, radiative transfer and cloud physics of hot and steamy atmospheres is weak," and that we "cannot therefore completely rule out the possibility that human actions might cause a transition, if not to full runaway, then at least to a much warmer climate state than the present one."

A runaway greenhouse effect similar to Venus appears to have virtually no chance of being caused by anthropogenic activities. A 2013 article concluded that a runaway greenhouse effect "could in theory be triggered by increased greenhouse forcing," but that "anthropogenic emissions are probably insufficient." Venus-like conditions on Earth require a large long-term forcing that is unlikely to occur until the Sun brightens by some tens of percents, which will take a few billion years. Earth is expected to experience a runaway greenhouse effect "in about 2 billion years as solar luminosity increases".

== History ==
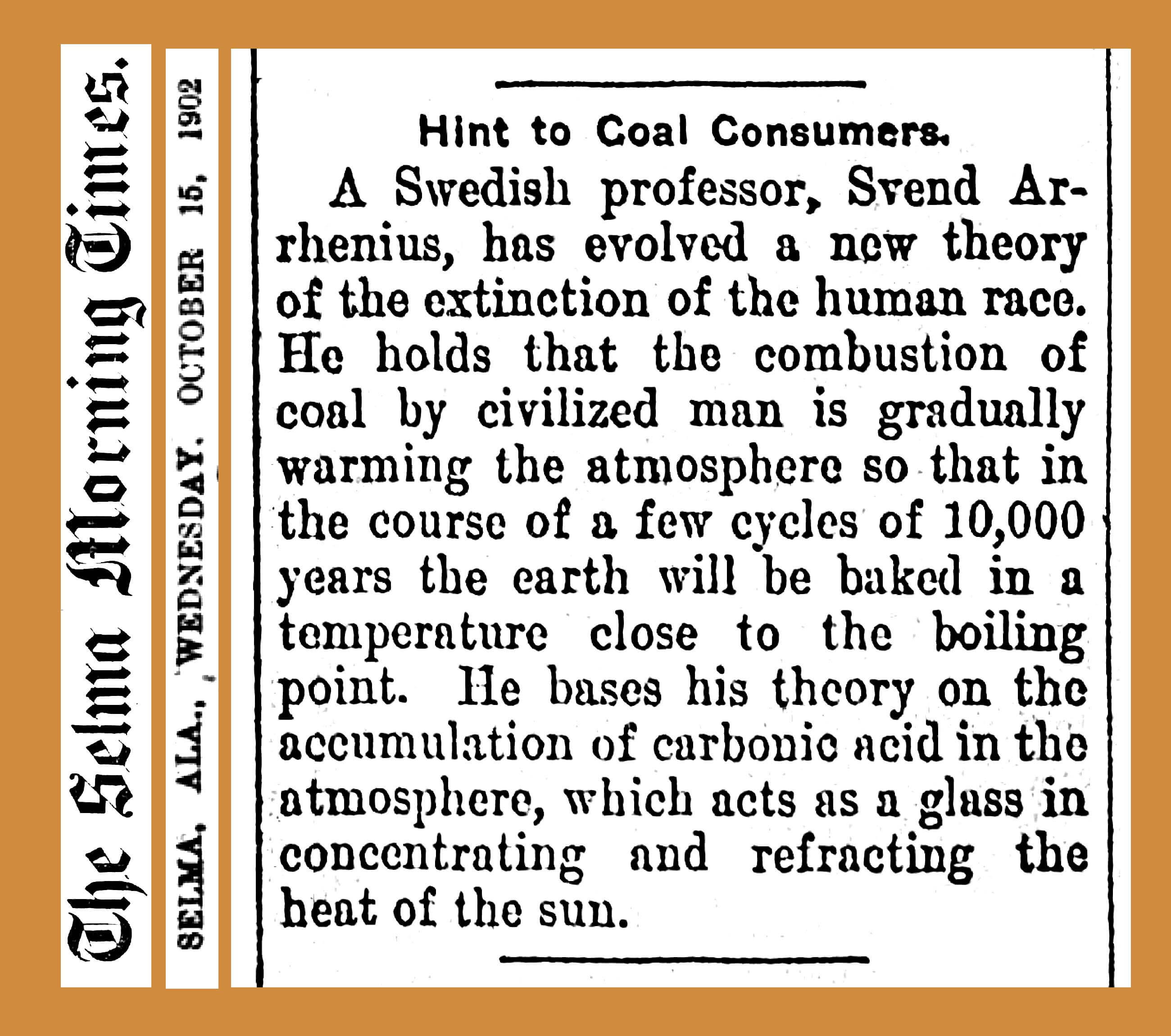
This 1902 article attributes to Swedish Nobel laureate (for chemistry) Svante Arrhenius a theory that coal combustion could eventually lead to a degree of global warming causing human extinction.

While the term was first coined by Caltech scientist Andrew Ingersoll in a paper that described a model of the atmosphere of Venus, the initial idea of a limit on terrestrial outgoing infrared radiation was published by George Simpson in 1927. The physics relevant to what would later be named the runaway greenhouse effect, was explored by Makoto Komabayashi at Nagoya University. Assuming a water vapor-saturated stratosphere, Komabayashi and Ingersoll independently calculated the limit on outgoing infrared radiation that defines the runaway greenhouse state. That limit is now known as the Komabayashi–Ingersoll limit, to recognize their contributions.

== Physics ==
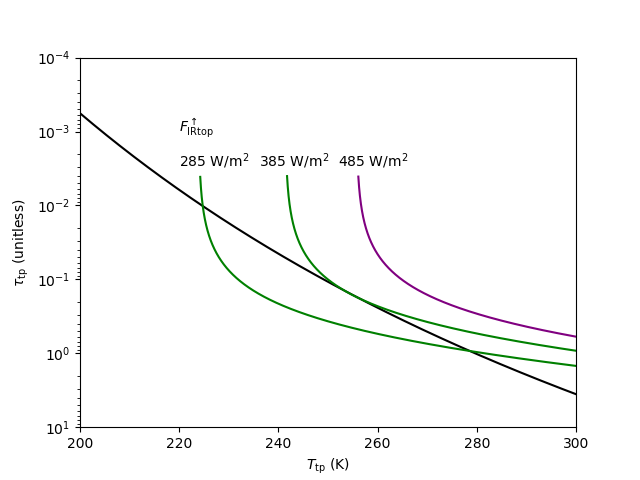
Graph of tropopause optical depth by tropopause temperature, illustrating the Komabayashi–Ingersoll limit of 385 W/m^{2} using equations and values from Nakajima et al. (1992) "A Study on the Runaway Greenhouse Effect with a One-Dimensional Radiative–Convective Equilibrium Model". The Komabayashi–Ingersoll limit is the value of outgoing longwave radiation (FIRtop) beyond which the lines do not intersect.

A runaway greenhouse effect occurs when greenhouse gases accumulate in the atmosphere through a positive feedback cycle to such an extent that they substantially block radiated heat from escaping into space, thus greatly increasing the temperature of the planet.

The runaway greenhouse effect is often formulated in terms of how the surface temperature of a planet changes with differing amounts of received starlight. If the planet is assumed to be in radiative equilibrium, then the runaway greenhouse state is calculated as the equilibrium state at which water cannot exist in liquid form. The water vapor is then lost to space through hydrodynamic escape. In radiative equilibrium, a planet's outgoing longwave radiation (OLR) must balance the incoming stellar flux.

The Stefan–Boltzmann law is an example of a negative feedback cycle that stabilizes a planet's climate system. If the Earth received more sunlight it would result in a temporary disequilibrium (more energy in than out) and result in warming. However, because the Stefan–Boltzmann response mandates that this hotter planet emits more energy, eventually a new radiation balance can be reached and the temperature will be maintained at its new, higher value. Positive climate change feedbacks amplify changes in the climate system, and can lead to destabilizing effects for the climate. An increase in temperature from greenhouse gases leading to increased water vapor (which is itself a greenhouse gas) causing further warming is a positive feedback, but not a runaway effect, on Earth. Positive feedback effects are common (e.g. ice–albedo feedback) but runaway effects do not necessarily emerge from their presence. Though water plays a major role in the process, the runaway greenhouse effect is not a result of water vapor feedback.

The runaway greenhouse effect can be seen as a limit on a planet's outgoing longwave radiation that, when surpassed, results in a state where water cannot exist in its liquid form (hence, the oceans have all "boiled away"). A planet's outgoing longwave radiation is limited by this evaporated water, which is an effective greenhouse gas and blocks additional infrared radiation as it accumulates in the atmosphere. Assuming radiative equilibrium, runaway greenhouse limits on outgoing longwave radiation correspond to limits on the increase in stellar flux received by a planet to trigger the runaway greenhouse effect. Two limits on a planet's outgoing longwave radiation have been calculated that correspond with the onset of the runaway greenhouse effect: the Komabayashi–Ingersoll limit and the Simpson–Nakajima limit. At these values the runaway greenhouse effect overcomes the Stefan–Boltzmann feedback so an increase in a planet's surface temperature will not increase the outgoing longwave radiation.

The Komabayashi–Ingersoll limit was the first to be analytically derived and only considers a grey stratosphere in radiative equilibrium. A grey stratosphere (or atmosphere) is an approach to modeling radiative transfer that does not take into account the frequency-dependence of absorption by a gas. In the case of a grey stratosphere or atmosphere, the Eddington approximation can be used to calculate radiative fluxes. This approach focuses on the balance between the outgoing longwave radiation at the tropopause,$F^\uparrow_\text{IRtop}$, and the optical depth of water vapor, $\tau_\text{tp}$, in the tropopause, which is determined by the temperature and pressure at the tropopause according to the saturation vapor pressure. This balance is represented by the following equations
$$\begin{align}
\frac{1}{2}F^\uparrow_\text{IRtop}\left(\frac{3}{2}\tau_\text{tp}+1\right) &= \sigma T_\text{tp}^4 \\
\tau_\text{tp} &= \kappa_{v}p^*(T_\text{tp})\frac{1}{g}\frac{m_v}{\bar{m}}
\end{align}$$
Where the first equation represents the requirement for radiative equilibrium at the tropopause and the second equation represents how much water vapor is present at the tropopause. Taking the outgoing longwave radiation as a free parameter, these equations will intersect only once for a single value of the outgoing longwave radiation, this value is taken as the Komabayashi–Ingersoll limit. At that value the Stefan–Boltzmann feedback breaks down because the tropospheric temperature required to maintain the Komabayashi–Ingersoll OLR value results in a water vapor optical depth that blocks the OLR needed to cool the tropopause.

The Simpson–Nakajima limit is lower than the Komabayashi–Ingersoll limit, and is thus typically more realistic for the value at which a planet enters a runaway greenhouse state. For example, given the parameters used to determine a Komabayashi–Ingersoll limit of 385 W/m^{2}, the corresponding Simpson–Nakajima limit is only about 293 W/m^{2}. The Simpson–Nakajima limit builds off of the derivation of the Komabayashi–Ingersoll limit by assuming a convective troposphere with a surface temperature and surface pressure that determines the optical depth and outgoing longwave radiation at the tropopause.

=== The moist greenhouse limit ===
Because the model used to derive the Simpson–Nakajima limit (a grey stratosphere in radiative equilibrium and a convecting troposphere) can determine the water concentration as a function of altitude, the model can also be used to determine the surface temperature (or conversely, amount of stellar flux) that results in a high water mixing ratio in the stratosphere. While this critical value of outgoing longwave radiation is less than the Simpson–Nakajima limit, it still has dramatic effects on a planet's climate. A high water mixing ratio in the stratosphere would overcome the effects of a cold trap and result in a "moist" stratosphere, which would result in the photolysis of water in the stratosphere that in turn would destroy the ozone layer and eventually lead to a dramatic loss of water through hydrodynamic escape. This climate state has been dubbed the moist greenhouse effect, as the end-state is a planet without water, though liquid water may exist on the planet's surface during this process.

== Connection to habitability ==
The concept of a habitable zone has been used by planetary scientists and astrobiologists to define an orbital region around a star in which a planet (or moon) can sustain liquid water. Under this definition, the inner edge of the habitable zone (i.e., the closest point to a star that a planet can be until it can no longer sustain liquid water) is determined by the outgoing longwave radiation limit beyond which the runaway greenhouse process occurs (e.g., the Simpson–Nakajima limit). This is because a planet's distance from its host star determines the amount of stellar flux the planet receives, which in turn determines the amount of outgoing longwave radiation the planet radiates back to space. While the inner habitable zone is typically determined by using the Simpson–Nakajima limit, it can also be determined with respect to the moist greenhouse limit, though the difference between the two is often small.

Calculating the inner edge of the habitable zone is strongly dependent on the model used to calculate the Simpson–Nakajima or moist greenhouse limit. The climate models used to calculate these limits have evolved over time, with some models assuming a simple one-dimensional, grey atmosphere, and others using a full radiative transfer solution to model the absorption bands of water and carbon dioxide. These earlier models that used radiative transfer derived the absorption coefficients for water from the HITRAN database, while newer models use the more current and accurate HITEMP database, which has led to different calculated values of thermal radiation limits. More accurate calculations have been done using three-dimensional climate models that take into account effects such as planetary rotation and local water mixing ratios as well as cloud feedbacks. The effect of clouds on calculating thermal radiation limits is still in debate (specifically, whether or not water clouds present a positive or negative feedback effect).

== Runaway greenhouse effect in the Solar System ==
=== Venus ===
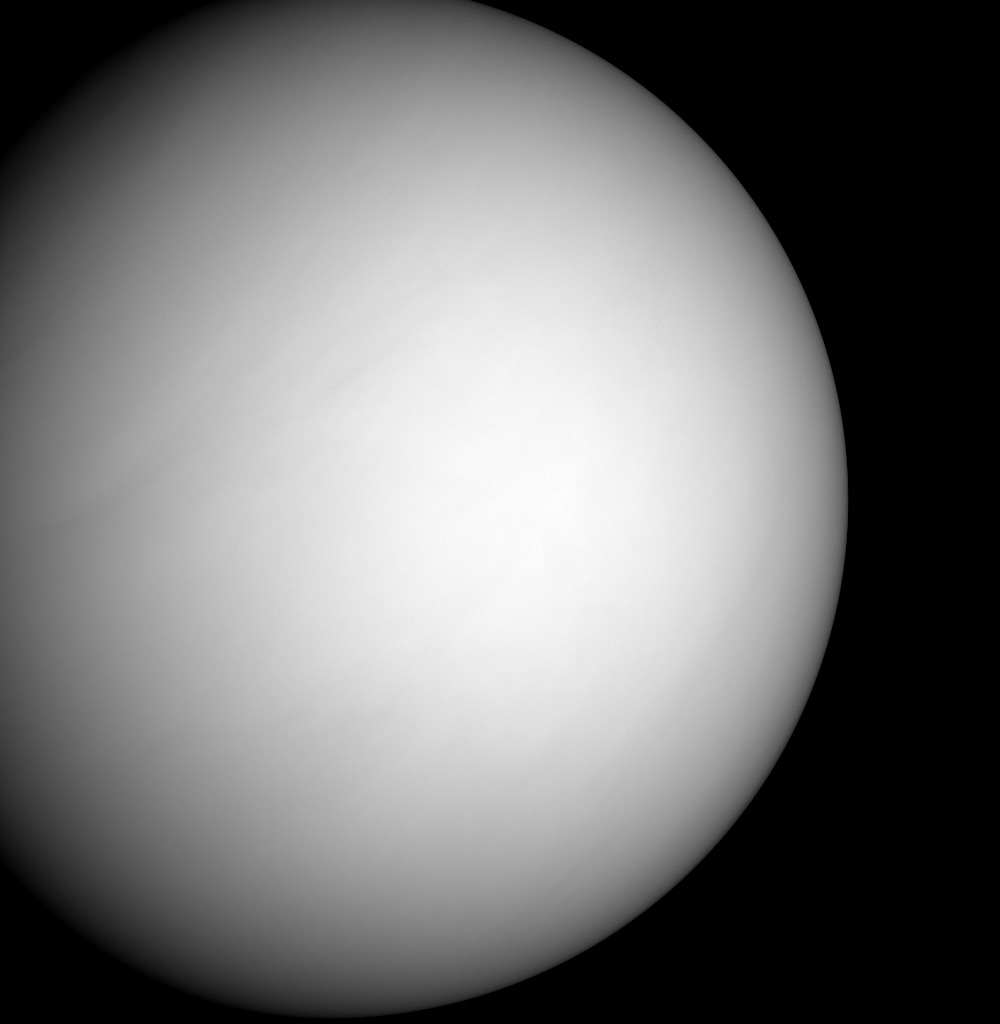
Venus' oceans may have boiled away in a runaway greenhouse effect.

A runaway greenhouse effect involving carbon dioxide and water vapor likely occurred on Venus. In this scenario, early Venus may have had a global ocean if the outgoing thermal radiation was below the Simpson–Nakajima limit but above the moist greenhouse limit. As the brightness of the early Sun increased, the amount of water vapor in the atmosphere increased, increasing the temperature and consequently increasing the evaporation of the ocean, leading eventually to the situation in which the oceans evaporated.

This scenario helps to explain why there is little water vapor in the atmosphere of Venus today. If Venus initially formed with water, the runaway greenhouse effect would have hydrated Venus' stratosphere, and the water would have escaped to space. Some evidence for this scenario comes from the extremely high deuterium to hydrogen ratio in Venus' atmosphere, roughly 150 times that of Earth, since light hydrogen would escape from the atmosphere more readily than its heavier isotope, deuterium.

Venus is sufficiently strongly heated by the Sun that water vapor can rise much higher in the atmosphere and be split into hydrogen and oxygen by ultraviolet light. The hydrogen can then escape from the atmosphere while the oxygen recombines or bonds to iron on the planet's surface. The deficit of water on Venus due to the runaway greenhouse effect is thought to explain why Venus does not exhibit surface features consistent with plate tectonics, meaning it would be a stagnant lid planet.

Carbon dioxide, the dominant greenhouse gas in the current Venusian atmosphere, owes its larger concentration to the weakness of carbon recycling as compared to Earth, where the carbon dioxide emitted from volcanoes is efficiently subducted into the Earth by plate tectonics on geologic time scales through the carbonate–silicate cycle, which requires precipitation to function.

=== Earth ===
Early investigations on the effect of atmospheric carbon dioxide levels on the runaway greenhouse limit found that it would take orders of magnitude higher amounts of carbon dioxide to take the Earth to a runaway greenhouse state. This is because carbon dioxide is not anywhere near as effective at blocking outgoing longwave radiation as water is. Within current models of the runaway greenhouse effect, carbon dioxide (especially anthropogenic carbon dioxide) does not seem capable of providing the necessary insulation for Earth to reach the Simpson–Nakajima limit.

Debate remains, however, on whether carbon dioxide can push surface temperatures towards the moist greenhouse limit. Climate scientist John Houghton wrote in 2005 that "[there] is no possibility of [Venus's] runaway greenhouse conditions occurring on the Earth". However, climatologist James Hansen stated in Storms of My Grandchildren (2009) that burning coal and mining oil sands will result in runaway greenhouse on Earth. A re-evaluation in 2013 of the effect of water vapor in the climate models showed that James Hansen's outcome would require ten times the amount of CO_{2} we could release from burning all the oil, coal, and natural gas in Earth's crust.

As with the uncertainties in calculating the inner edge of the habitable zone, the uncertainty in whether CO_{2} can drive a moist greenhouse effect is due to differences in modeling choices and the uncertainties therein. The switch from using HITRAN to the more current HITEMP absorption line lists in radiative transfer calculations has shown that previous runaway greenhouse limits were too high, but the necessary amount of carbon dioxide would make an anthropogenic moist greenhouse state unlikely. Full three-dimensional models have shown that the moist greenhouse limit on surface temperature is higher than that found in one-dimensional models and thus would require a higher amount of carbon dioxide to initiate a moist greenhouse than in one-dimensional models.

Other complications include whether the atmosphere is saturated or sub-saturated at some humidity, higher CO_{2} levels in the atmosphere resulting in a less hot Earth than expected due to Rayleigh scattering, and whether cloud feedbacks stabilize or destabilize the climate system.

Complicating the matter, research on Earth's climate history has often used the term "runaway greenhouse effect" to describe large-scale climate changes when it is not an appropriate description as it does not depend on Earth's outgoing longwave radiation. Though the Earth has experienced a diversity of climate extremes, these are not end-states of climate evolution and have instead represented climate equilibria different from that seen on Earth today. For example, it has been hypothesized that large releases of greenhouse gases may have occurred concurrently with the Permian–Triassic extinction event or Paleocene–Eocene Thermal Maximum. Additionally, during 80% of the latest 500 million years, the Earth is believed to have been in a greenhouse state due to the greenhouse effect, when there were no continental glaciers on the planet, the levels of carbon dioxide and other greenhouse gases (such as water vapor and methane) were high, and sea surface temperatures (SSTs) ranged from 40 °C (104 °F) in the tropics to 16 °C (65 °F) in the polar regions.

==== Distant future ====
Most scientists believe that a runaway greenhouse effect is inevitable in the long term, as the Sun gradually becomes more luminous as it ages, and will spell the end of all life on Earth. As the Sun becomes 10% brighter about one billion years from now, the surface temperature of Earth will reach 47 °C (117 °F) (unless albedo is increased sufficiently), causing the temperature of Earth to rise rapidly and its oceans to boil away until it becomes a greenhouse planet, similar to Venus today.

The current loss rate is approximately one millimeter of ocean per million years. This is due to the colder upper layer of the troposphere acting as a cold trap currently preventing Earth from permanently losing its water to space at present, even with manmade global warming (this is also the reason why climate change is only going to make extreme weather events worse in the near term, as a warmer atmosphere can hold more moisture, as even with global warming, the cold trap ensures that the current atmosphere will still be too cold to allow water vapor to be rapidly lost to space). This is being overshadowed by shorter-term changes in sea level, such as the currently rising sea level due to the melting of glaciers and polar ice. However, the rate is gradually accelerating, as the sun gets warmer, to perhaps as fast as one millimeter every 1000 years, by ultimately making the atmosphere so hot that the cold trap is pushed even higher up until it eventually fails to prevent the water from being lost to space.

Ward and Brownlee predict that there will be two variations of the future warming feedback: the "moist greenhouse" in which water vapor dominates the troposphere and starts to accumulate in the stratosphere and the "runaway greenhouse" in which water vapor becomes a dominant component of the atmosphere such that the Earth starts to undergo rapid warming, which could send its surface temperature to over 900 °C (1,650 °F), causing its entire surface to melt and killing all life, perhaps about three billion years from now. In both cases, the moist and runaway greenhouse states the loss of oceans will turn the Earth into a primarily-desert world. The only water left on the planet would be in a few evaporating ponds scattered near the poles as well as huge salt flats around what was once the ocean floor, much like the Atacama Desert in Chile or Badwater Basin in Death Valley. The small reservoirs of water may allow life to remain for a few billion more years.

As the Sun brightens, CO_{2} levels should decrease due to an increase of activity in the carbon-silicate cycle corresponding to the increase of temperature. That would mitigate some of the heating Earth would experience because of the Sun's increase in brightness. Eventually, however, as the water escapes, the carbon cycle will cease as plate tectonics come to a halt because of the need for water as a lubricant for tectonic activity.

== Runaway refrigerator effect ==
Mars and Earth during the Cryogenian period may have experienced the opposite of a runaway greenhouse effect: a runaway refrigerator effect. Through this effect, a runaway feedback process may have removed much carbon dioxide and water vapor from the atmosphere and cooled the planet. Water condenses on the surface, leading to carbon dioxide dissolving and chemically binding to minerals. This reduced the greenhouse effect, lowering the temperature and causing more water to condense. The result was lower temperatures, with water being frozen as subsurface permafrost, leaving only a thin atmosphere. In addition, ice and snow are far more reflective than open water, with an albedo of 50-70% and 85% respectively. This means that as a planet's temperature decreases and more of its water freezes, its ability to absorb light is reduced, which in turn makes it even colder, creating a positive feedback loop. This effect, combined with the decrease in heat-retaining clouds and vapor, becomes runaway once snow and ice coverage reach a certain threshold (within 30 degrees of the equator), plunging the planet into a stable snowball state.

== See also ==
- Atmosphere of Venus, an example of a runaway greenhouse effect
- Greenhouse and icehouse Earth
