= Angstrem =

Angstrem (Russian: Ангстрем) is a Russian variant of transcription of the Swedish surname Ångström (Angstrom), which may refer to:

- Angstrem (company), a Russian integrated circuits manufacturer
- Angstrem Stadium, a Russian football stadium, the home stadium of FC Zelenograd

== See also ==
- Ångström (disambiguation)
