= Dmitry Davydov =

Dmitry Davydov may refer to:

- Dmitri Davydov (footballer, born 1975), Russian football manager and former centre-back
- Dmitry Davydov (footballer, born 1978), Russian football goalkeeper
- Dmitry Davydov (filmmaker) (born 1983), Russian film director
