= Komabayashi–Ingersoll limit =

Limit in planetary science

In planetary science, the Komabayashi–Ingersoll limit represents the maximum solar flux a planet can handle without a runaway greenhouse effect setting in.

For planets with temperature-dependent sources of greenhouse gases such as liquid water and optically thin atmospheres the outgoing longwave radiation curve (which indicates how fast energy can be radiated away by the planet) flattens at high temperatures, reaching a horizontal asymptote – the Komabayashi–Ingersoll limit itself. Since the equilibrium temperature is the intersection of this curve and a horizontal line representing solar flux, for fluxes above this point the planet heats up indefinitely. Kasting estimated the limit for Earth to be 320 watts per square meter.

The limit is relevant for estimating the inner edge of the circumstellar habitable zone. However, the limit also depends on the surface gravity of the planet, making heavy worlds somewhat more resistant to the runaway effect.
