= C-Man =

C-Man may refer to:

- The Coastal-Marine Automated Network, a meteorological observation network along the coastal United States
- C-Man (film), a 1949 American film directed by Joseph Lerner
