= Sergei Yegorov =

Sergei Yegorov is the name of:

- Sergei Yegorov (footballer, born 1973), Kazakhstani footballer who played for FC Bolat, FC Shakhter Karagandy, FC Energia Kamyshin, FC Uralan Elista, FC Baltika Kaliningrad and FC Anzhi Makhachkala
- Sergei Yegorov (football manager) (born 1975), Russian football functionary, president of FC Zelenograd
- Sergei Yegorov (footballer, born 1983), Russian footballer with FC Arsenal Tula, FC Ural Sverdlovsk Oblast and FC Baltika Kaliningrad
- Sergei Yegorov (footballer, born 1959), Latvian footballer who played for Daugava Riga
