= AERONET =

Network of ground-based sun photometers

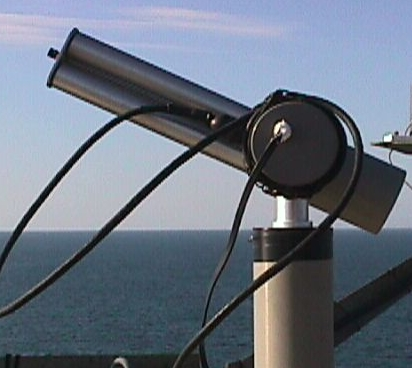
CIMEL Sunphotometer

AERONET - the AERONET (AErosol RObotic NETwork) is a network of ground-based sun photometers which measure atmospheric aerosol properties. The measurement system is a solar-powered CIMEL Electronique 318A spectral radiometer that measures Sun and sky radiances at a number of fixed wavelengths within the visible and near-infrared spectrum. There is one sea-based reading location aboard the E/V Nautilus, the exploration vessel operated by Dr. Robert Ballard and the Sea Research Foundation. Two readings per day are taken aboard the ship while it is in operation.

AERONET provides continuous cloud-screened observations of spectral aerosol optical depth (AOD), precipitable water, and inversion aerosol products in diverse aerosol regimes. Inversion products are retrieved from almucantar scans of radiance as a function of scattering angle and include products such as aerosol volume size distribution, aerosol complex refractive index, optical absorption (single scattering albedo) and the aerosol scattering phase function. All these products represent an average of the total aerosol column within the atmosphere.

The aerosol properties are retrieved via an inversion algorithm developed by Dubovik and King (2000). Further algorithms were developed, for example, by Dubovik et al. (2006) to take into account non-spherical shapes of aerosol particles such as mineral dust.

AERONET is an observing system in the NOAA Observing System Architecture.

== See also ==
- Aerosol
- Angstrom exponent
