= Bengt Westerlund =

Swedish astronomer (1921–2008)

Bengt Elis Westerlund (January 17, 1921 - June 4, 2008) was a Swedish astronomer who specialised in observational astronomy.

He received his PhD from Uppsala University in 1954. In 1957 he was appointed astronomer at the Uppsala Southern Station at Mount Stromlo Observatory in Australia, where he made extensive studies of the southern Milky Way and the Magellanic Clouds. In 1967 he took a position as astronomer at Steward Observatory in Arizona and in 1969 was appointed Director of ESO in Chile, a position he held until 1975, when he returned to Sweden to become Professor of Astronomy at Uppsala Astronomical Observatory, retiring in 1987.

== Work ==
His work on the structure of the Milky Way and the Magellanic Clouds was held in high regard. He contributed significantly in studies of star clusters, stellar populations, carbon stars, planetary nebulae, Wolf-Rayet stars, stellar classification and supernova remnants. He was regarded as an expert on the Magellanic Clouds and wrote a book on them (The Magellanic Clouds, Cambridge University Press, 1997 ISBN 0521480701).

== Discoveries ==
He discovered or rediscovered three open star clusters, Westerlund 1, Westerlund 2 and Westerlund 3. He also discovered numerous red supergiants and giants within the Large Magellanic Cloud (along with several foreground stars), including the red hypergiant WOH G64 A.

== Honors ==
=== Namesakes ===
Asteroid 2902 Westerlund was named after him when he retired from his professorship and the Westerlund telescope in Uppsala was named in his honour in 2004.
