= Langley extrapolation =

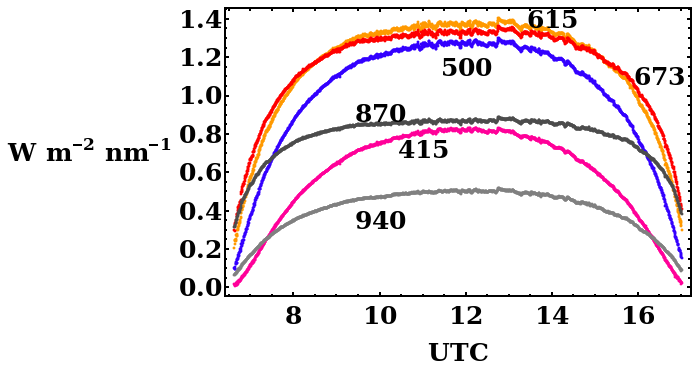
Direct solar radiation, at the various wavelengths indicated in nanometers, as measured at Niamey Niger on 24 December 2006, with a Multi-Filter Rotating Shadowband Radiometer (MFRSR). Measurements are plotted as a function of time in UTC.

Langley extrapolation is a method for determining the Sun's irradiance at the top of the atmosphere with ground-based instrumentation, and is often used to remove the effect of the atmosphere from measurements of, for example, aerosol optical thickness or ozone. It is based on repeated measurements with a Sun photometer operated at a given location for a cloudless morning or afternoon as the Sun moves across the sky. It is named for American astronomer and physicist Samuel Pierpont Langley.

== Theory ==
It is known from Beer's law that, for every instantaneous measurement, the direct-Sun irradiance I is linked to the solar extraterrestrial irradiance I_{0} and the atmospheric optical depth $\tau$ by the following equation:

$I / I_0 = e^{-m \tau},\,$	1

where m is a geometrical factor accounting for the slant path through the atmosphere, known as the airmass factor. For a plane-parallel atmosphere, the airmass factor is simple to determine if one knows the solar zenith angle θ: m = 1/cos(θ). As time passes, the Sun moves across the sky, and therefore θ and m vary according to known astronomical laws.

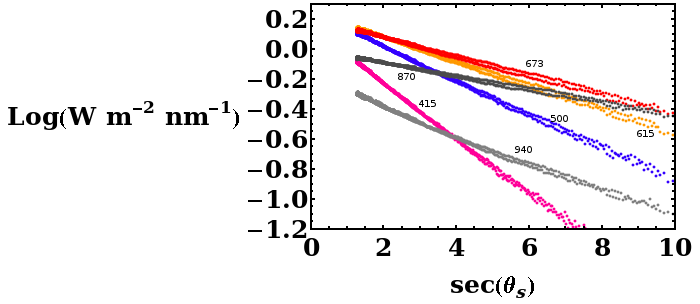
Direct solar radiation as a function of secant of solar zenith angle at Niamey, Niger. December 24, 2006. From ARM data, from an MFRSR instrument. Wavelength in units of nanometers is indicated. Log is base 10.

By taking the logarithm of the above equation, one obtains:

$\ln I = \ln I_0 - m \tau,$	2

and if one assumes that the atmospheric disturbance $\tau$ does not change during the observations (which last for a morning or an afternoon), the plot of ln I versus m is a straight line with a slope equal to $\tau$. Then, by linear extrapolation to m = 0, one obtains I_{0}, i.e. the Sun's radiance that would be observed by an instrument placed above the atmosphere.

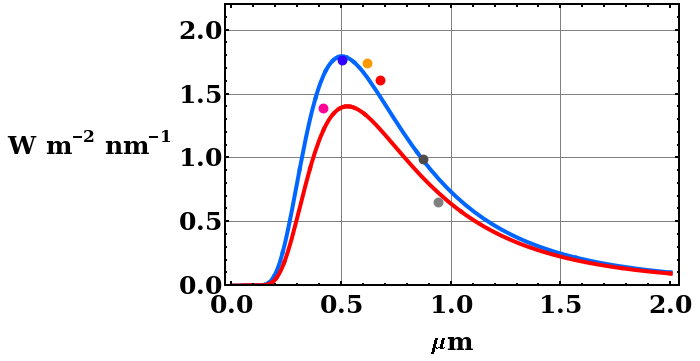
Points are Langley extrapolation to top of atmosphere of direct solar radiation measured at Niamey, Niger 24 December 2006. Compared with Planck functions with the wavelength in micrometers.

The requirement for good Langley plots is a constant atmosphere (constant $\tau$). This requirement can be fulfilled only under particular conditions, since the atmosphere is continuously changing. Needed conditions are in particular: the absence of clouds along the optical path, and the absence of variations in the atmospheric aerosol layer. Since aerosols tend to be more concentrated at low altitude, Langley extrapolation is often performed at high mountain sites. Data from NASA Glenn Research Center indicates that the Langley plot accuracy is improved if the data is taken above the tropopause.

== Solar cell calibration ==
A Langley plot can also be used as a method to calculate the performance of solar cells outside the Earth's atmosphere. At the Glenn Research Center, the performance of solar cells is measured as a function of altitude. By extrapolation, researchers determine their performance under space conditions.

== Low cost LED-based photometers ==
Sun photometers using low cost light-emitting diode (LED) detectors in place of optical interference filters and photodiodes have a relatively wide spectral response. They might be used by a globally distributed network of students and teachers to monitor atmospheric haze and aerosols, and can be calibrated using Langley extrapolation. In 2001, David Brooks and Forrest Mims were among many to propose detailed procedures to modify the Langley plot in order to account for Rayleigh scattering, and atmospheric refraction by a spherical Earth.

Di Justo and Gertz compiled a handbook for using Arduino to develop these photometers in 2012. The handbook refers to $\tau$ in equations (1) and (2), as the AOT (Atmospheric Optical Thickness), and the handbook refers to I_{0} as the EC (extraterrestrial constant). The manual suggests that once a photometer is constructed, the user waits for a clear day with few clouds, no haze and constant humidity. After the data is fit to equation (1) to find I_{0}, the handbook suggests a daily measurement of I. Both I_{0} and I are obtained from the LED current (voltage across sensing resistor) by subtracting the dark current:

$I = V_s-V_d$	3

where $V_s$ is the voltage while the LED is pointing at the Sun, and $V_d$ is the voltage while the LED is kept dark. There is a misprint in the manual regarding the calculation of $\tau$ from this single data point. The correct equation is:

$\tau = \frac{\ln I_0 - \ln I}{m} = \frac{\ln(I_0/I)}{m}$	4

where $I_0$ was calculated on that clear and stable day using Langley extrapolation.
