= Angstrom exponent =

Mathematical parameter

The Angstrom exponent or Ångström exponent is a parameter that describes how the optical thickness of an aerosol typically depends on the wavelength of the light.

== Definition ==
In 1929, the Swedish physicist Anders K. Ångström found that the optical thickness of an aerosol depends on the wavelength of light according to the power law

$$\frac{\tau_\lambda}{\tau_{\lambda_0}}=\left (\frac{\lambda}{\lambda_0}\right )^{-\alpha}$$

where $\tau_\lambda$ is the optical thickness at wavelength $\lambda$, and $\tau_{\lambda_0}$ is the optical thickness at the reference wavelength $\lambda_0$. The parameter $\alpha$ is the Angstrom exponent of the aerosol.

== Significance ==
The Angstrom exponent is inversely related to the average size of the particles in the aerosol: the smaller the particles, the larger the exponent. For example, cloud droplets are usually large, and thus clouds have very small Angstrom exponent (nearly zero), and the optical depth does not change with wavelength. That is why clouds appear to be white or grey.

This relation can be used to estimate the particle size of an aerosol by measuring its optical depth at different wavelengths.

== Determining the exponent ==
In principle, if the optical thickness at one wavelength and the Angstrom exponent are known, the optical thickness can be computed at a different wavelength. In practice, measurements are made of the optical thickness of an aerosol layer at two different wavelengths, and the Angstrom exponent is estimated from these measurements using this formula. The aerosol optical thickness can then be derived at all other wavelengths, within the range of validity of this formula.

For measurements of optical thickness $\tau_{\lambda_1}\,$ and $\tau_{\lambda_2}\,$ taken at two different wavelengths $\lambda_1\,$ and $\lambda_2\,$ respectively, the Angstrom exponent is given by

$$\alpha = - \frac{\log \frac{\tau_{\lambda_1}}{\tau_{\lambda_2}}}{\log \frac{\lambda_1}{\lambda_2}}\,$$

The Angstrom exponent is now routinely estimated by analyzing radiation measurements acquired on Earth Observation platforms, such as AErosol RObotic NETwork (AERONET).

== See also ==
- Langley extrapolation
