= Water on Venus =

Historical scientific hypothesis

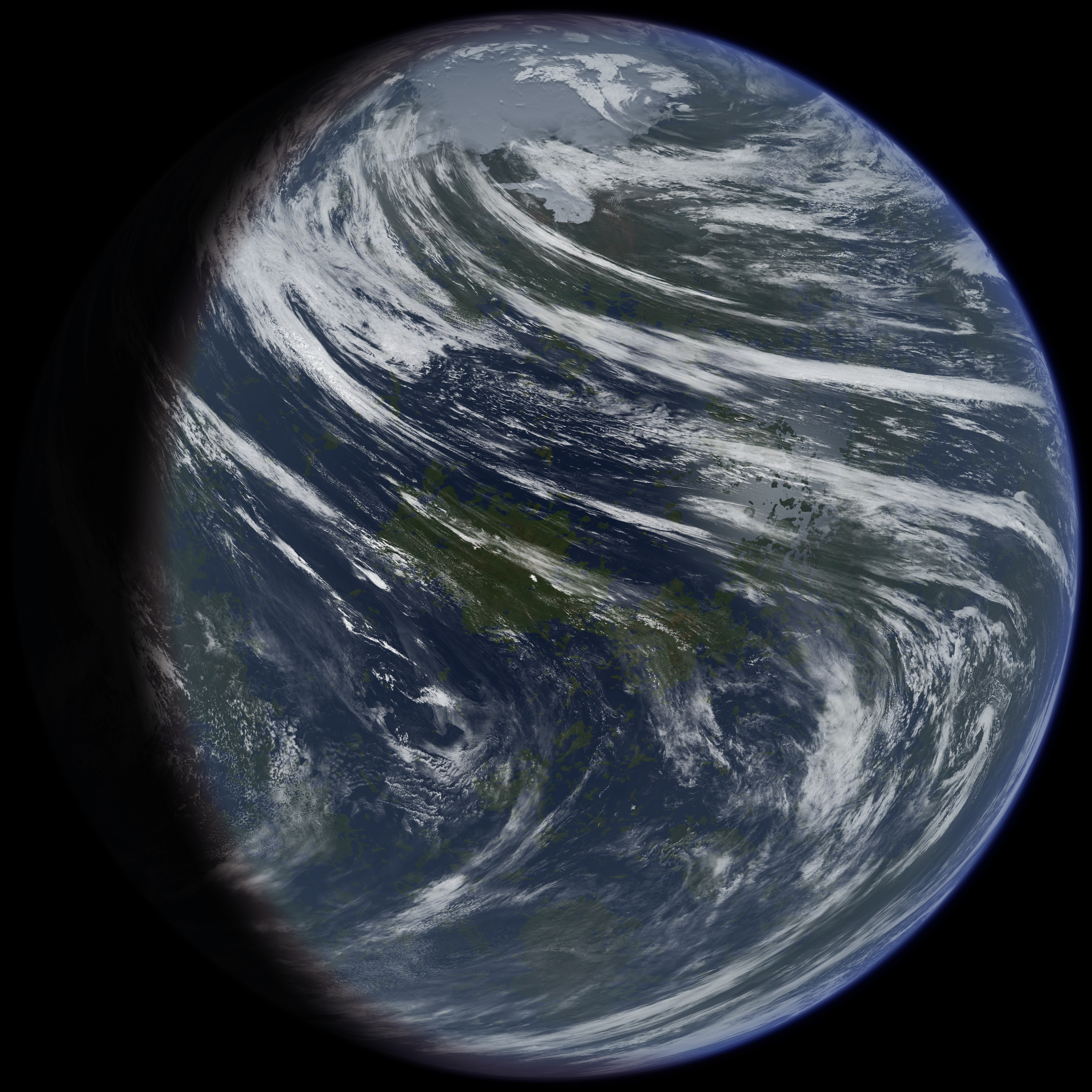
Artist's concept of a habitable Venus

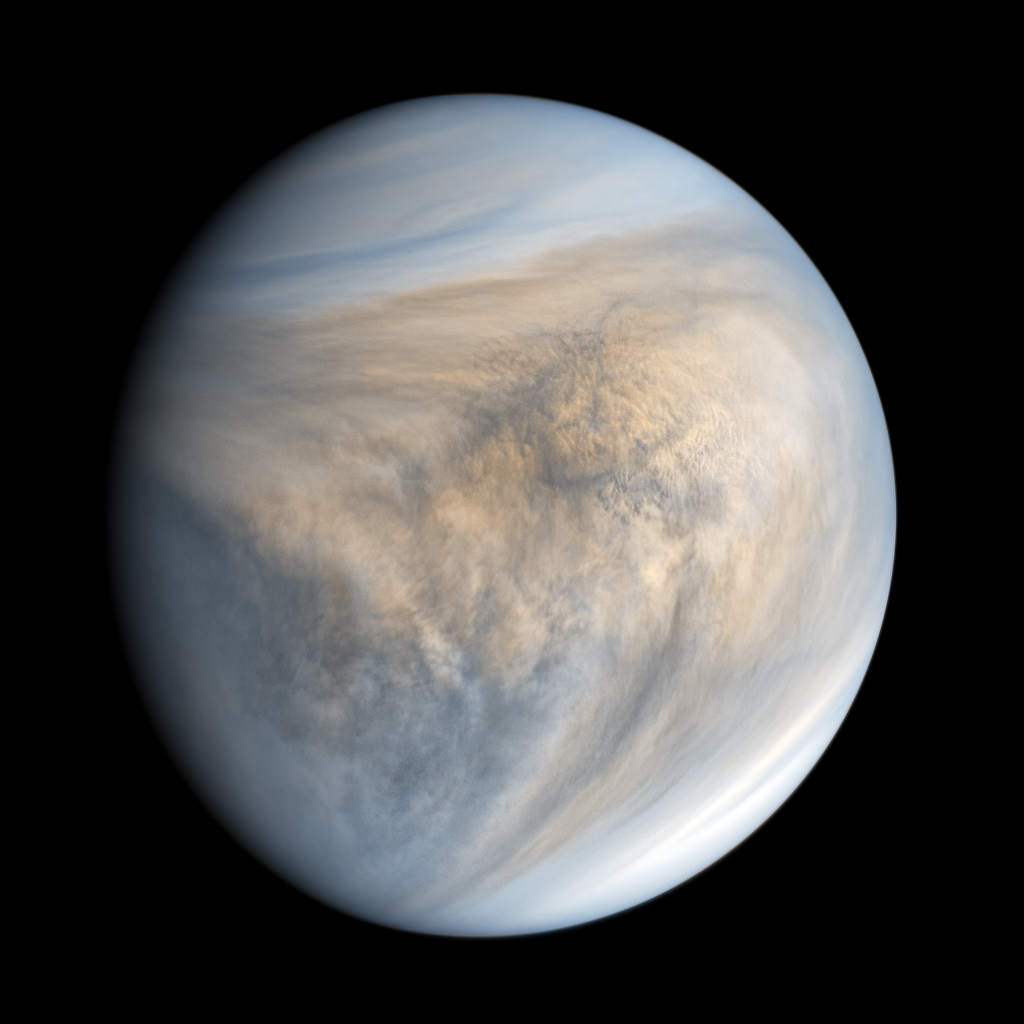
Present-day Venus in UV light

Water on Venus is the hypothesis that for up to 2 billion years, a shallow liquid water ocean may have covered the surface of Venus. It is thought that dry land lying near the equator would have limited the evaporation of oceans and the greenhouse effect, allowing liquid water to exist for some time on Venus. However, recent studies of Venus's atmosphere and interior suggest that Venusian surface water evaporated prior to 3 billion years ago or never existed.

Scientists and authors long proposed Venus was habitable, although information from the Soviet Union's Venera missions, and from the Pioneer Venus Orbiter probe, Magellan spacecraft and many more Venus studying spacecraft proved that Venus was the complete opposite.

== Water disappearance on Venus ==
Several hypotheses have been considered for how Venus lost its water. One hypothesis states that when Venus had water, solar radiation was as low as 30% less than it is today. This means the habitable zone was stretched from Venus to Earth (and possibly to Mars), before eventually Solar maxima began creating greenhouse gases in Venus' atmosphere, making the atmosphere thicker, evaporating away all liquid water on the planet's surface. However, studies have suggested that Venusian habitability needed to end prior to 3 billion years ago with a maximum ocean depth of 300 meters across its entire surface to produce the Venusian atmosphere we see today. The results suggest that Venus has been uninhabitable for more than 70% of its history, four times longer than some previous estimates.

== Spacecraft discoveries ==
Data from the Venus Express satellite, made by the European Space Agency (ESA), took pictures of Venus, officially unveiling that Venus could have potentially had liquid, although how the liquid formed on Venus is still unclear. New simulations using this previous data have been created at NASA's Goddard Institute for Space Studies in New York.

Other studies of Venus' surface via various probes found evidence for hematite on its surface, suggesting that water may have once interacted with Venus' surface. Hematite is an iron oxide mineral that can be formed within water-related processes. However, hematite could form from volcanic activity and geological formations, or could originate from comets or asteroids.

== Recent studies ==
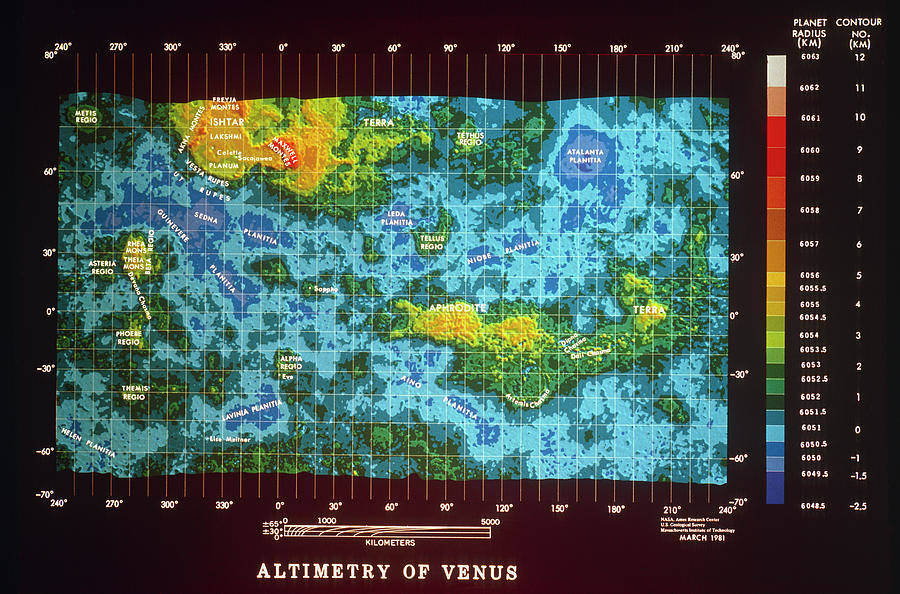
Pioneer Venus color-coded elevation map of Venus revealing continents

Venus's cloud data suggest that Venus's clouds contain a small amount of water, indicating that Venus may have had a functioning water cycle. Using image data from Magellan, scientists could fill lowlands of Venus' surface area with water, leaving only Venusian continents visible. The test also used measurements from the Pioneer Venus project from the 1980s. Scientists concluded from data that Venus could have been exposed to much sunlight for two months, and then no light for two months, evaporating or freezing leftover liquids on Venus' surface. Later, this would destroy water-vapor molecules as the Sun's ultraviolet radiation would spread rapidly on Venus over time, removing crucial elements from Venus' atmosphere, including hydrogen, which is an important molecule in liquids. Hydrogen later was stripped from Venus, creating a runaway greenhouse effect because there was no water.

However, a study from 2023 concluded that only hypothetical habitable eras that ended prior to 3 billion years ago are consistent with argon, oxygen, water vapor, and carbon monoxide concentrations in Venus’s modern atmosphere. Furthermore, a study from 2024 found that Venusian volcanic gases have at most a 6% water mole fraction, which is substantially drier than terrestrial magmas degassed at similar conditions. This indicates that Venus never had oceans on its surface and has likely been a inhospitable world for its entire history.

== Geological surface feature hints ==
The Magellan probe detected valleys and channels on Venus, which directly links to erosion of land, sedimentary deposits, and most recently and commonly volcanic activity and tectonic activity.

Studies of Venus' surface via the Magellan probe indicate that Venus has valleys and channels, which are not directly connected to volcanic activity, but may be linked to tectonic activity on Venus. Asteroid impacts on Venus are another common phenomenon that could have shaped Venus' surface to evolve with these geological features, although such an asteroid would have to be huge because asteroids burn up in Venus's atmosphere and pass through clouds sulfuric and other acids.

== Future investigation ==
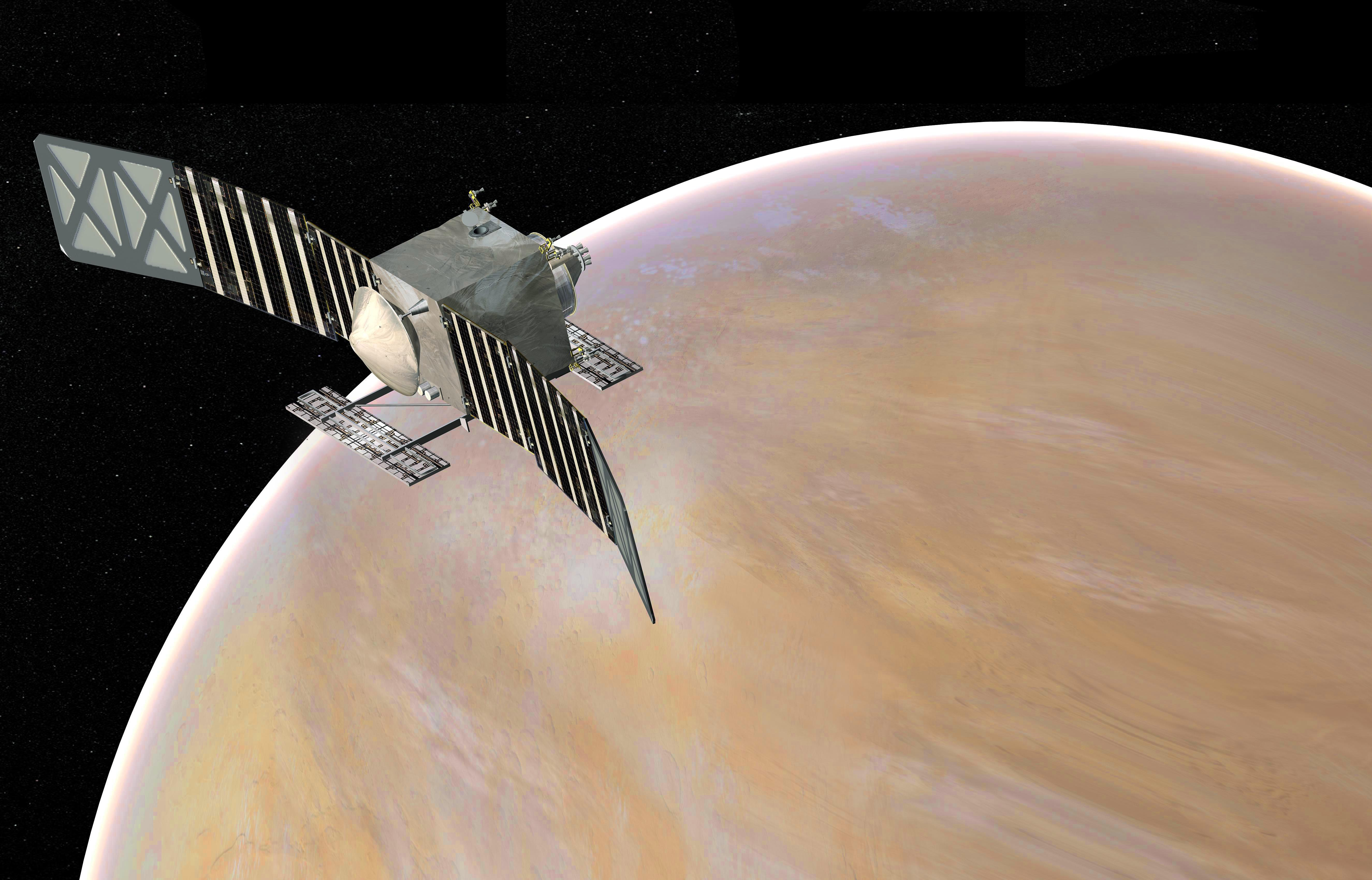
Illustration of NASA's VERITAS mission orbiting Venus

NASA's VERITAS (Venus Emissivity, Radio Science, InSAR, Topography, and Spectroscopy) mission will help look for geological surface features on Venus, with better technology then Magellan, giving a better understanding of Venus' past, including possible presence of water. VERITAS will also analyze surface materials and map out its surface temperatures, which could help explain the presence of water-related minerals, and may also contribute to understanding Venus's hydrothermal activity. Instruments will spectroscope the planet's surface. VERITAS will also use past and present data to analyze specific minerals and rocks with hydrated minerals or other water-related materials on the surface. This data could help scientists better understand past climate, geological evolution and water composition.

== Mechanisms to revive liquids on the surface ==
One way to revive such liquids on Venus' surface is to strip greenhouse gases from its atmosphere, and replace it with breathable gases, which will release trapped heat, cooling down the planet to an average temperature like Earth's. Over time, the reduction of such greenhouse gases will thin Venus' thick atmosphere, lowering atmospheric pressure. Satellites orbiting Venus on its day side that reflect heat can help reduce temperatures and compensate for greenhouse gases getting back into the atmosphere. Using space mirrors, similar to that of the Znamya satellite, could expose the night side of the planet to light for the same duration as the average day on Earth. Manufacturing a proper magnetosphere would also help. Using data from two Japanese scientists, it is possible to make an artificial magnetosphere around Venus by building a system of refrigerated latitudinal superconducting rings. Using this, scientists could build an artificial magnetosphere around Venus to prevent the loss of hydrogen from its atmosphere. After all the foregoing processes, hydrogen must be added to the atmosphere to help revive liquid water on the surface. Hydrogen would combine with chemicals in the atmosphere to create liquid water.

== See also ==
- Water on Mars
