= NOAA Observing System Architecture =

Environmental datasets collection by the National Oceanic Atmospheric Administration

The NOAA Observing System Architecture (NOSA) is a collection of over 100 environmental datasets of the National Oceanic and Atmospheric Administration (NOAA) . It was established to develop an observational architecture that helps NOAA to design observing systems that support NOAA's mission, avoid duplication of existing systems and operate efficiently in a cost-effective manner.

NOSA includes:

- NOAA's observing systems (and others) required to support NOAA's mission,
- The relationship among observing systems; including how they contribute to support NOAA's mission and associated observing requirements, and
- The guidelines governing the design of a target architecture and the evolution toward this target architecture

== See also ==
- ACARS
- AERONET
- FluxNet
- Coastal-Marine Automated Network

== Sources ==
- "Noaa Web Site Provides Huge Inventory Of Earth Observing Systems". National Oceanic and Atmospheric Administration.
- Fox, C. G; Habermann, T.; Stroker, K. J. (2004). "A Spatial Portal for Accessing NOAA's Observing Systems". AGU Fall Meeting Abstracts. 2004. adsabs.harvard.edu: SF34A–02. Bibcode:2004AGUFMSF34A..02F.
- "NOAA Observing Systems Architecture (NOSA)". idn.ceos.org.
- "NOAA Maps the Future of Sensors that Gather Data from the 'Bottom of the Ocean to the Sun'". www.spaceref.com.
