= Anders Knutsson Ångström =

Swedish physicist and meteorologist (1888-1981)

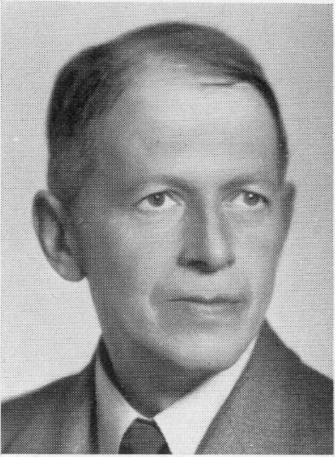
- Ångström in 1958
- Born: 1888; Stockholm, Sweden
- Died: 1981 (aged 92–93)
- Occupations: Physicist, meteorologist
- Known for: Ångström exponent Pyranometer
- Father: Knut Ångström
- Relatives: Anders Jonas Ångström (grandfather); Johan Ångström (great-grandfather)
- Awards: International Meteorological Organization Prize (1962)

Anders Knutsson Ångström (1888 – 1981) was a Swedish physicist and meteorologist who was known primarily for his contributions to the field of atmospheric radiation. However, his scientific interests encompassed many diverse topics.

He was the son of physicist Knut Ångström. He graduated with a BS from the University of Upsala in 1909. Then he completed his MS at the University of Upsala in 1911. He taught at the Stockholm University. Later, he was the department head of the Meteorology department at State Meteorological and Hydrological Institute (SMHI) of Sweden 1945–1949 and SMHI's chancellor 1949–1954.

He is credited with the invention of the pyranometer, the first device to accurately measure direct and indirect solar radiation.

In 1962 he was awarded the International Meteorological Organization Prize by the World Meteorological Organization.

== See also ==
- Angstrom exponent
- Anders Jonas Ångström (grandfather)
- Knut Ångström (father)
- Albedo
- Insolation
