= Sun photometer =

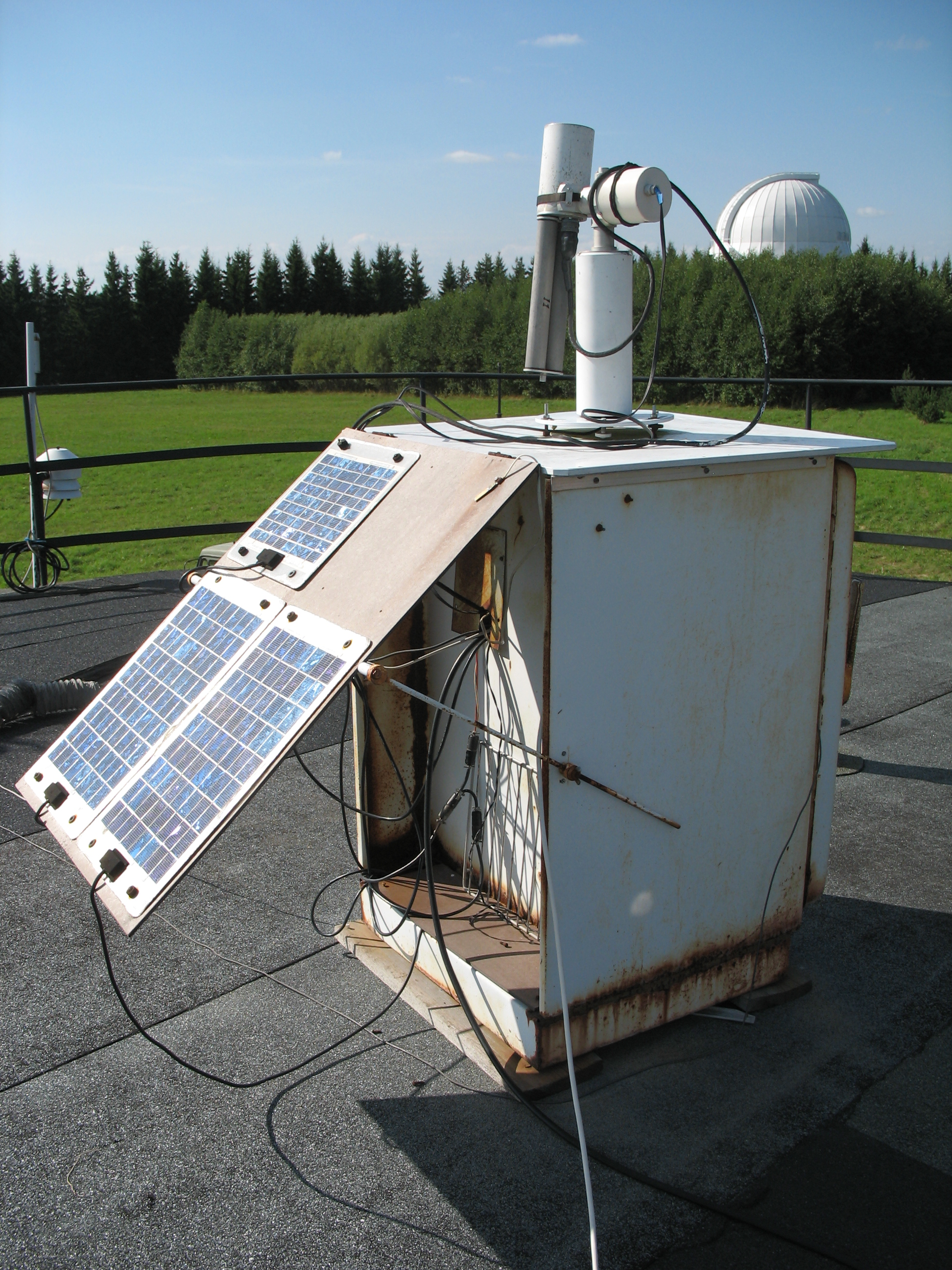
Sun photometer CIMEL 318A in Tõravere

A Sun photometer is a type of photometer conceived in such a way that it points at the Sun. Recent sun photometers are automated instruments incorporating a Sun-tracking unit, an appropriate optical system, a spectrally filtering device, a photodetector, and a data acquisition system. The measured quantity is called direct-sun radiance.

When a Sun-photometer is placed somewhere within the Earth's atmosphere, the measured radiance is not equal to the radiance emitted by the Sun (i.e. the solar extraterrestrial radiance), because the solar flux is reduced by atmospheric absorption and scattering. Therefore, the measured radiant flux is due to a combination of what is emitted by the Sun and the effect of the atmosphere; the link between these quantities is given by Beer's law.

The atmospheric effect can be removed with Langley extrapolation; this method therefore allows measuring the solar extraterrestrial radiance with ground-based measurements. Once the extraterrestrial radiance is known, one can use the Sun photometer for studying the atmosphere, and in particular for determining the atmospheric optical depth. Also, if the signal at two or more suitably selected spectral intervals is measured, one can use the information derived for calculating the vertically integrated concentration of selected atmospheric gases, such as water vapour, ozone, etc.

== See also ==
- Dobson ozone spectrophotometer
- AERONET
