= Dmitry Davydov (footballer, born 1978) =

Russian footballer

Personal information
- Full name: Dmitry Alexeyevich Davydov
- Date of birth: 23 January 1978 (age 48)
- Place of birth: Novomoskovsk, Dnipropetrovsk Oblast, Ukrainian SSR
- Height: 1.89 m (6 ft 2 1/2 in)
- Position: Goalkeeper

Senior career*
Years	Team	Apps	(Gls)
1997–1999	FC Metalurh Novomoskovsk	3	(0)
2001–2005	FC SKA-Energiya Khabarovsk	59	(0)
2005–2006	FC Spartak Sumy	9	(0)
2007	FC Zelenograd	19	(0)
2008	FC Lukhovitsy	21	(0)
2009	FC Ryazan	26	(0)
2010	FC Zvezda Ryazan	17	(0)
2011–2013	FC Spartak Tambov	53	(0)
2013	FC Tambov	6	(0)
- * Club domestic league appearances and goals

Dmitry Alexeyevich Davydov (Russian: Дми́трий Алексе́евич Давы́дов; born 23 January 1978) is a former Russian professional association football player. He also holds Ukrainian citizenship as Dmytro Oleksiyovych Davydov (Ukrainian: Дмитро Олексійович Давидов).

== Club career ==
He played 4 seasons in the Russian Football National League for FC SKA-Energiya Khabarovsk.
