= Coastal-Marine Automated Network =

Meteorological observation network along the coast of the United States

The Coastal-Marine Automated Network (C-MAN) is a meteorological observation network along the coastal United States. Consisting of about sixty stations installed on lighthouses, at capes and beaches, on near shore islands, and on offshore platforms, the stations record atmospheric pressure, wind direction, speed and gust, and air temperature; however, some C-MAN stations are designed to also measure sea surface temperature, water level, waves, relative humidity, precipitation, and visibility.

The network is maintained by the National Data Buoy Center (NDBC) of the National Weather Service (NWS), which is part of National Oceanic and Atmospheric Administration (NOAA), and data is ingested into numerical weather prediction computer models. It was created in the early 1980s to maintain observations that were about to be discontinued by other programs. Data is processed and transmitted similarly to the moored buoy system.

In 2002, C-MAN was added to the NOAA Observing System Architecture (NOSA).

== See also ==
- List of cabled observatories
- Shipping Forecast
