= Sergei Yegorov (football manager) =

Russian professional football coach (born 1975)

Personal information
- Full name: Sergei Sergeyevich Yegorov
- Date of birth: August 5, 1975 (age 51)

Team information
- Current team: FC Zelenograd (manager/director)

Managerial career
- Years: Team
- 2006: FC Zelenograd (tech. director)
- 2007: FC Zelenograd (deputy director)
- 2008–: FC Zelenograd (director)
- 2010–: FC Zelenograd

Sergei Sergeyevich Yegorov (Russian: Серге́й Серге́евич Егоров; born August 5, 1975) is a Russian professional football coach currently managing FC Zelenograd in the Russian Second Division. He also is a director for the club.
