= FC Zelenograd =

Zelenograd
- Full name: Football Club Zelenograd
- Nickname(s): Zeleno-Belye (Green-Whites)
- Founded: 2002
- Ground: Angstrem Stadium, Zelenograd, Moscow
- Capacity: 3070
- Chairman: (Russia) Sergei Yegorov
- Manager: (Russia) Andrey Kobelev
- Coach: (Azerbaijan) Vali Gasimov
- League: Russian championship between amateur football clubs (III division)
Home colours	Away colours

FC Zelenograd (Russian: Футбольный клуб «Зеленоград») is an association football club from Zelenograd, Moscow. The club was founded in 2002 and plays in the Russian Amateur Football League, which is the fourth level of the Russian football league system.

== History ==
=== Amateur Football League ===
FC Zelenograd was founded in 2002. In the same year they made their debut in Amateur Football League. Their roster consisted mainly of graduates from Sport School № 112 "Sputnik", which as of today, still serves as FC Zelenograd Sport School. Their debut was rather disappointing as they could only finish in the 16th place from 21 places.

A year after, FC Zelenograd was officially registered as a legal entity and once again participated in the AFL. In 2003 Zelenograd made an improvement as they finished in the 11th place. In 2004 and 2005, Zelenograd's performance improved and twice they ended up runners-up of the league. Finally, in 2006, the Zeleno-Belye won the Championship and thus won the right to participate in the Russian Second Division, ran by the Professional Football League. This meant that the club had to shift into a professional outfit and to reconstruct their home stadium, the Angstrem Stadium.

=== Russian Second Division ===
The club was successfully licensed to participate in the Second Division, and in their debut they ended in the 12th place. Zelenograd's stay in the Russian Second Division was a rather a disappointing one as the highest place that they ever achieved was the 11th place, with the worse being the 14th place, which signaled the end for the club as a professional one, even though technically the team was not relegated.

=== Return to the Amateur Football League ===
This is because, following the disappointing show in 2010, the Council of the club decided to withdraw the club from the Second Division and apply to participate in the recently formed Russian championship between amateur football clubs (III division), which replaced the Amateur Football League.

== Current squad ==
As of October, 2011

Note: Flags indicate national team as defined under FIFA eligibility rules; some limited exceptions apply. Players may hold more than one non-FIFA nationality.

No.	Pos.	Nation	Player
—	GK	(Russia) RUS	Artem Sidorov
—	GK	(Russia) RUS	Roman Ohanjanian
—	GK	(Russia) RUS	Danil Kopitov
—	GK	(Russia) RUS	Alexey Arkhangelsk
—	GK	(Russia) RUS	Alexey Pozdnyakov
—	DF	(Russia) RUS	Maksim Arkhipov
—	DF	(Russia) RUS	Artem Guts
—	DF	(Russia) RUS	Ivan Kopylov
—	DF	(Russia) RUS	Eugene Kudryashov
—	DF	(Russia) RUS	Ivan Morozov
—	DF	(Russia) RUS	Mikhail Murashov
—	DF	(Russia) RUS	Vladislav Smirnov
—	DF	(Russia) RUS	Evgeny Sorokin
—	MF	(Russia) RUS	Dmitri Adushev

No.	Pos.	Nation	Player
—	MF	(Russia) RUS	Alexander Arshikov
—	MF	(Russia) RUS	Ivan Elfimov
—	MF	(Russia) RUS	Nikita Ivanov
—	MF	(Russia) RUS	Yegor Korostelev
—	MF	(Russia) RUS	Aslan Mammadov
—	MF	(Russia) RUS	Vadim Moiseenko
—	MF	(Russia) RUS	Valery Ushakov
—	MF	(Russia) RUS	Valentin Sharipov
—	FW	(Russia) RUS	Teimour Hasanov
—	FW	(Russia) RUS	Pavel Kryuchkov
—	FW	(Russia) RUS	Ilya Novozhilov
—	FW	(Russia) RUS	Roman Hitrun
—	FW	(Russia) RUS	Artyom Klyuyev
—	FW	(Russia) RUS	Sergei Nechushkin
