= Angstrem Stadium =

Football stadium in Moscow, Russia

Coordinates: 55°59′00″N 37°13′28″E

- Interactive map of Angstrem Stadium
- Location: Zelenograd, Moscow, Russia
- Owner: FC Zelenograd
- Capacity: 3,070
- Surface: Grass

Construction
- Groundbreaking: 2006
- Opened: 2007

Tenant
- FC Zelenograd

Angstrem Stadium is a football stadium in Zelenograd, Moscow, Russia. It is the home stadium of FC Zelenograd.

The stadium was initially built in the 1970s for the Angstrem company, handed over to the club in 2006 and reconstructed in 2007.

In April 2014 the stadium was listed as possible 2018 FIFA World Cup training base for teams playing in Moscow.
