= RTI Surgical =

American medical technology company

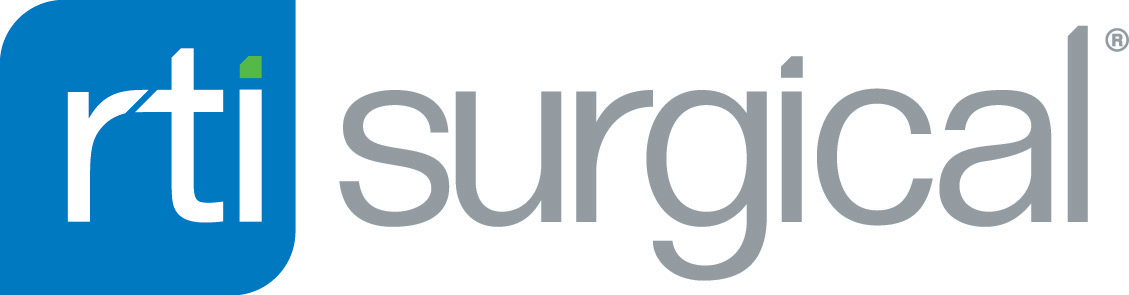
- Company type: Private
- Industry: Medical technology
- Founded: 1998 as Regeneration Technologies, Inc.
- Headquarters: Alachua, Florida, United States
- Products: Medical devices
- Revenue: ▲$280 million
- Website: www.rtisurgical.com

RTI Surgical is a medical technology company that was founded in 1998 after spinning off from the University of Florida Tissue Bank Alachua, Florida, United States.

RTI began operations as Regeneration Technologies in Alachua, Fla. In February 1998, the University of Florida Tissue Bank transferred its allograft processing operations, related equipment and technologies, distribution arrangements, and research and development activities to Regeneration Technologies. This spin-off from the University of Florida (UF) is one of the most successful UF technology transfers to date.

In 2012, RTI was a defendant in a civil case involving the body snatching activities of Michael Mastromarino and other organizations supplying RTI with human tissue and body parts. The suit would have investigated how RTI ignored the questionable credentials of the organizations that supplied them body parts and tissue by forging consent documents and "cutting open the corpses and harvesting tissue, bone and organs and replacing those body parts with materials purchased at local hardware stores, such as PVC pipes and rubber gloves." RTI's legal representation argued that the company is "allowed to accept tissue—without any civil liability whatsoever—as long as they do so without actual knowledge of a contrary intent of the donor" but that they are not, in turn, legally required to investigate consent. The civil case was postponed in September 2012 in order to mediate settlements from RTI for the involved plaintiff families.

Pioneer Surgical was acquired in July 2013 by RTI Biologics, and the company was then renamed RTI Surgical.

In 2020, Montagu Private Equity acquired RTI Surgical’s OEM business.
