= Angström (crater) =

Crater on the Moon

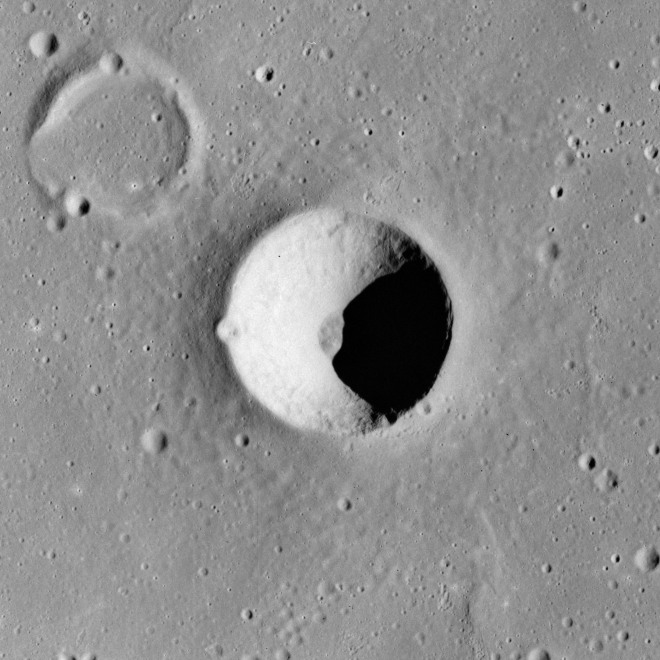
- Apollo 15 image
- Coordinates: 29.9°N 41.6°W
- Diameter: 9.55 km (5.93 mi)
- Depth: 2.0 km (1.2 mi)
- Colongitude: 42° at sunrise
- Formation: Eratosthenian
- Eponym: Anders J. Ångström

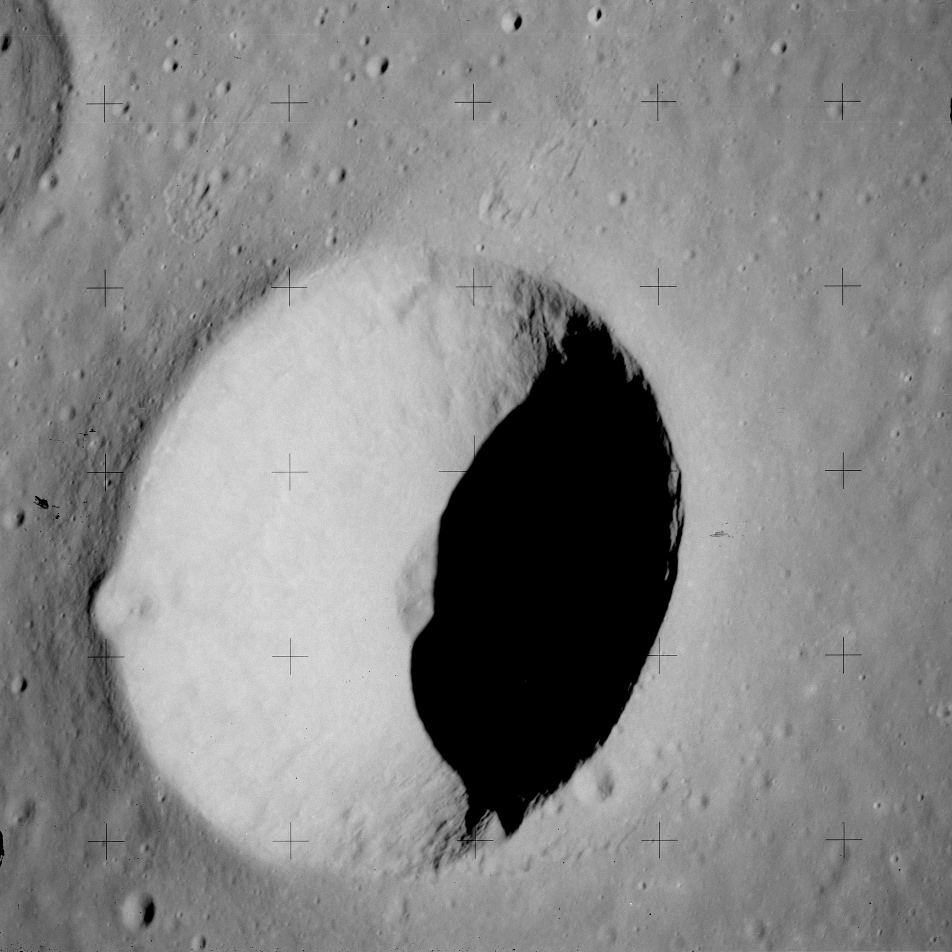
Oblique view from Apollo 15. NASA photo.

Ångström is a small lunar impact crater located on the border between Oceanus Procellarum to the west and Mare Imbrium to the east. To the south is a formation of mountains rising out of the mare named the Montes Harbinger. To the east are some wrinkle ridges named the Dorsum Bucher and Dorsa Argand.

This formation dates to the Eratosthenian period on the lunar geologic timescale. It is a bowl-shaped crater, with a circular rim and inner walls that slope down to the small central floor. It has a higher albedo than the surrounding maria. The crater halo is radar dark, indicating a lack of larger blocks among the fine ejecta.

This crater is named after Anders Jonas Ångström (1814-1874), a Swedish physicist and one of the pioneers of the science of spectroscopy. Its designation was formally adopted by the International Astronomical Union in 1935. The name was introduced into lunar nomenclature by J. N. Krieger and R. König in 1912.

== Satellite craters ==
By convention these features are identified on lunar maps by placing the letter on the side of the crater midpoint that is closest to Ångström.

Ångström	Latitude	Longitude	Diameter
A	30.9° N	41.1° W	6 km
B	31.7° N	44.1° W	6 km
