= Uppsala Astronomical Observatory =

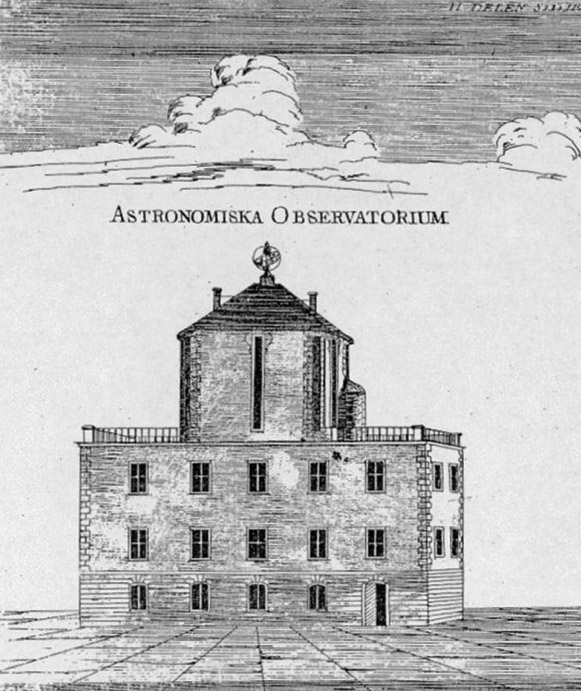
- The house of Anders Celsius with his observatory on the roof, from a contemporary engraving.
- Alternative names: Uppsala Observatory
- Organization: University of Uppsala
- Observatory code: 549
- Location: Uppsala, Sweden
- Coordinates: 59°51′35.5″N 17°38′13.1″E
- Established: 1741
- Website: www.astro.uu.se

The Uppsala Astronomical Observatory (UAO), Astronomiska observatoriet i Uppsala) is the oldest astronomical observatory in Sweden. It was founded in 1741, though there was a professorial chair of astronomy at the University of Uppsala from 1593 and the university archives include lecture notes in astronomy from the 1480s.

In the 18th century, Anders Celsius performed his research there and built the first observatory proper in 1741. Celsius got the university consistory to buy a large stone house of medieval origin in central Uppsala, where he had an observatory constructed on the rooftop. Celsius both worked and had his personal living quarters in the house. This observatory remained in use until the new observatory, now known as the "old observatory", was built in 1853. The Celsius house itself remains as one of few older buildings on a modern shopping street, but the observatory on the roof was demolished in 1857.

In the 19th century Anders Jonas Ångström was keeper of the observatory and conducted his experiments in astronomy, physics and optics there. His son, Knut Ångström, also conducted research on solar radiation at the observatory.

In 2000 the observatory merged with the Institute of Space Physics to form the Department of Astronomy and Space Physics and moved to the Ångström Laboratory. In 2008, another merger resulted in the Department of Physics and Astronomy, Astronomy and Space Physics becoming one of its divisions.

In addition to facilities in Uppsala, the observatory maintains the Kvistaberg Observatory in Sweden and the Uppsala Southern Station at the Siding Spring Observatory in Australia.

Research at the observatory over the years includes stellar parallaxes, stellar statistics, galactic structure, external galaxies, stellar atmospheres and Solar System research.
