= Optical depth =

Physics concept regarding radiation transparency and attenuation

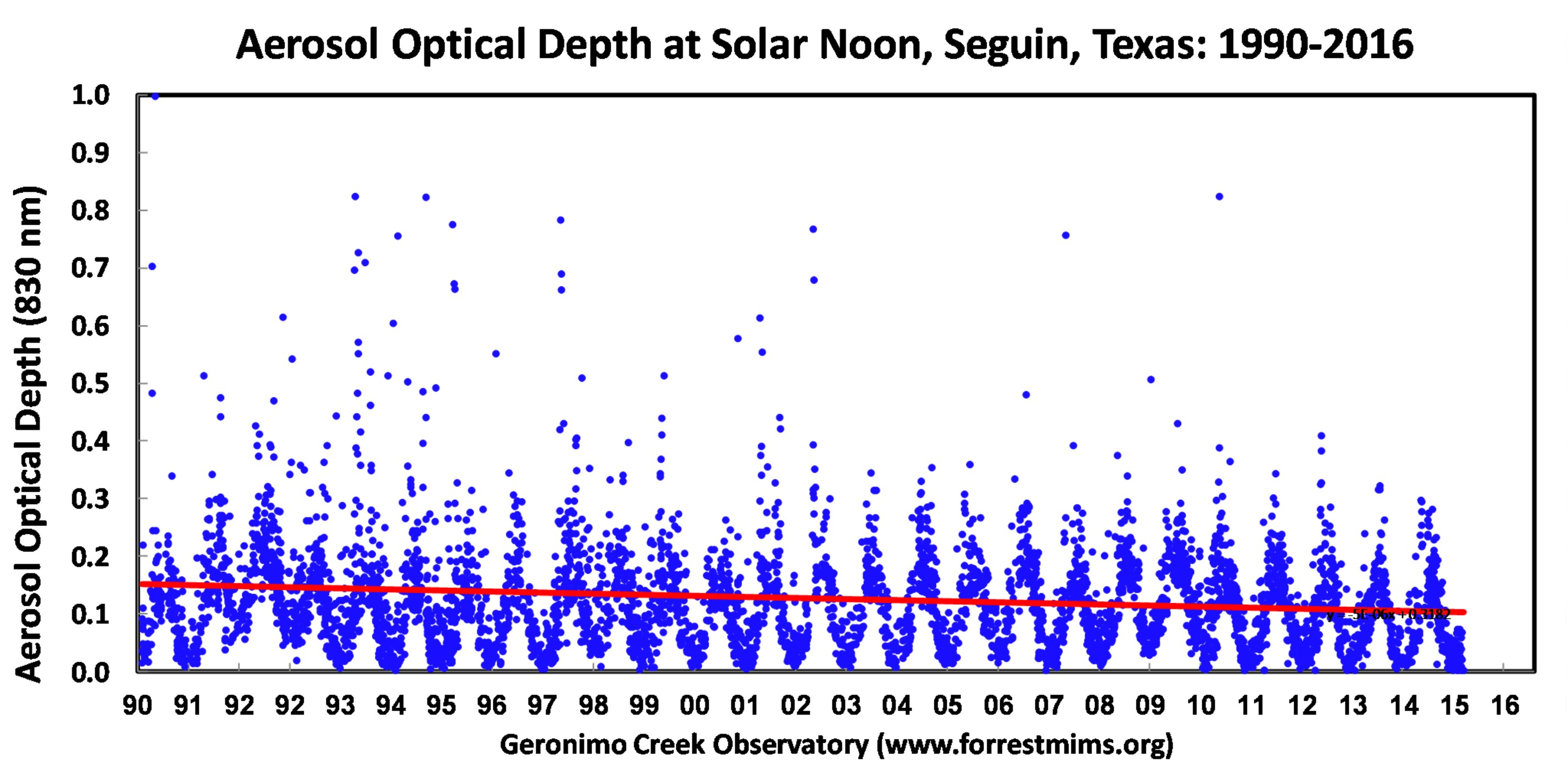
Aerosol Optical Depth (AOD) at 830 nm measured with an LED sun photometer (1990–2016) at Geronimo Creek Observatory, Texas. Measurements were recorded at or near solar noon. Peaks indicate smoke, dust, and smog events.

In physics, optical depth or optical thickness is the natural logarithm of the ratio of incident to transmitted radiant power through a material. Thus, the larger the optical depth, the smaller the fraction of transmitted radiant power through the medium. Spectral optical depth or spectral optical thickness is the natural logarithm of the ratio of incident to transmitted spectral radiant power through a material.

Optical depth is a dimensionless quantity. Although it is a monotonically increasing function of path length, it is not a physical distance itself, approaching zero as the path length vanishes. The use of the term "optical density" for optical depth is discouraged.

In chemistry, a closely related quantity called absorbance (or decadic absorbance) is used instead of optical depth. Absorbance uses the common logarithm (base 10) of the ratio of incident to transmitted radiant power. It relates to optical depth by a factor of log_{e}(10).

== Mathematical definitions ==
=== Optical depth ===
The optical depth of a material, denoted by $\tau$, is defined as:

$$\tau = \ln\!\left(\frac{\Phi_\mathrm{e}^\mathrm{i}}{\Phi_\mathrm{e}^\mathrm{t}}\right) = -\ln T$$

where

- $\Phi_\mathrm{e}^\mathrm{i}$ is the radiant flux received (incident) by that material;
- $\Phi_\mathrm{e}^\mathrm{t}$ is the radiant flux transmitted by that material;
- $T$ is the transmittance of that material.

The decadic absorbance $A$ is related to optical depth by:

$$\tau = A \ln 10 \approx 2.3026 A$$

=== Spectral optical depth ===
The spectral optical depth in frequency ($\tau_\nu$) or in wavelength ($\tau_\lambda$) is given by:

$$\tau_\nu = \ln\!\left(\frac{\Phi_{\mathrm{e},\nu}^\mathrm{i}}{\Phi_{\mathrm{e},\nu}^\mathrm{t}}\right) = -\ln T_\nu$$
$$\tau_\lambda = \ln\!\left(\frac{\Phi_{\mathrm{e},\lambda}^\mathrm{i}}{\Phi_{\mathrm{e},\lambda}^\mathrm{t}}\right) = -\ln T_\lambda$$

where

- $\Phi_{\mathrm{e},\nu}^\mathrm{i}$ and $\Phi_{\mathrm{e},\nu}^\mathrm{t}$ are the incident and transmitted spectral radiant fluxes in frequency;
- $T_\nu$ is the spectral transmittance in frequency;
- $\Phi_{\mathrm{e},\lambda}^\mathrm{i}$ and $\Phi_{\mathrm{e},\lambda}^\mathrm{t}$ are the incident and transmitted spectral radiant fluxes in wavelength;
- $T_\lambda$ is the spectral transmittance in wavelength.

Spectral absorbance relates to spectral optical depth via:

$$\tau_\nu = A_\nu \ln 10$$
$$\tau_\lambda = A_\lambda \ln 10$$

== Relationship with attenuation ==
=== Attenuation ===
Optical depth quantifies the attenuation of transmitted radiant power in a medium. Attenuation can occur via absorption, scattering, reflection, and other physical processes.

According to the Beer–Lambert law, the transmitted flux decays exponentially with optical depth:

$$T = e^{-\tau}$$

The fractional attenuation ($\text{ATT}$) is given by:

$$\text{ATT} = \frac{\Phi_\mathrm{e}^\mathrm{att}}{\Phi_\mathrm{e}^\mathrm{i}} = 1 - e^{-\tau} + E$$

where $E = \Phi_\mathrm{e}^\mathrm{e}/\Phi_\mathrm{e}^\mathrm{i}$ is the relative emittance of the medium. For optically thin media ($\tau \ll 1$) with negligible emission ($E \ll \tau$), attenuation reduces approximately to the optical depth itself:

$$\text{ATT} \approx \tau$$

=== Attenuation coefficient ===
The optical depth along a path of length $l$ is related to the local attenuation coefficient $\alpha(z)$ by:

$$\tau = \int_0^l \alpha(z)\, \mathrm{d}z$$

If $\alpha$ is uniform along the path, the relation simplifies to:

$$\tau = \alpha l$$

In terms of the attenuation cross-section $\sigma$ per particle and number density $n(z)$:

$$\tau = \int_0^l \sigma n(z)\, \mathrm{d}z = \sigma N$$

where $N = \int_0^l n(z)\,\mathrm{d}z$ is the column density along the line of sight.

== Applications ==
=== Atomic physics ===
In atomic physics, the spectral optical depth of a cloud of resonant two-level atoms can be determined from quantum-mechanical dipole transitions:

$$\tau_\nu = \frac{d^2 n \nu}{2 c \hbar \varepsilon_0 A \gamma} \mathcal{L}(\nu)$$

where

- $d$ is the transition dipole moment;
- $n$ is the total number of atoms;
- $\nu$ is the frequency of the incident radiation;
- $c$ is the speed of light;
- $\hbar$ is the reduced Planck constant;
- $\varepsilon_0$ is the vacuum permittivity;
- $A$ is the cross-sectional area of the beam;
- $\gamma$ is the natural linewidth of the atomic transition;
- $\mathcal{L}(\nu)$ is the normalized spectral line profile shape.

=== Atmospheric sciences ===
In atmospheric sciences, optical depth often refers to a vertical path extending from Earth's surface to outer space. For a slanted line of sight at zenith angle $\theta$, the slant optical depth $\tau$ relates to vertical optical depth $\tau'$ by the airmass factor $m$:

$$\tau = m \tau' \approx \tau' \sec\theta$$

yielding a total transmittance of:

$$T = e^{-\tau} = e^{-m\tau'}$$

The total atmospheric optical depth encompasses contributions from Rayleigh scattering, aerosol optical depth (AOD), and trace gas absorption, routinely measured using Sun photometers.

With altitude $z$, optical depth in an exponential atmosphere scales as:

$$\tau(z) = k_\text{a} w_1 \rho_0 H e^{-z/H}$$

giving a sea-level vertical optical depth of:

$$\tau(0) = k_\text{a} w_1 \rho_0 H$$

where:

- $k_\text{a}$ is the absorption coefficient;
- $w_1$ is the species mixing ratio;
- $\rho_0$ is the air density at sea level;
- $H$ is the atmospheric scale height;
- $z$ is the altitude above sea level.

For a uniform plane-parallel cloud layer, optical depth can be parameterized as:

$$\tau = Q_\text{e} \left[\frac{9\pi L^2 H N}{16\rho_\text{l}^2}\right]^{1/3}$$

where:

- $Q_\text{e}$ is the extinction efficiency;
- $L$ is the liquid water path;
- $H$ is the geometrical thickness of the cloud;
- $N$ is the droplet number concentration;
- $\rho_\text{l}$ is the density of liquid water.

Thus, for a constant cloud thickness and total liquid water content, optical depth scales with droplet concentration as $\tau \propto N^{1/3}$.

=== Astronomy ===
In astronomy, optical depth governs radiation escape from stellar atmospheres, planetary rings, and nebulae. In stellar physics, the photosphere is defined as the atmospheric depth where $\tau \approx 2/3$, representing the mean surface from which thermal photons escape into space.

For planetary rings, optical depth measures the fraction of light blocked by ring material during stellar occultations.

Mars global dust storm optical depth ($\tau$) evolution from May to September 2018, measured by the Mars Climate Sounder on the Mars Reconnaissance Orbiter.

== See also ==
- Air mass (astronomy)
- Absorptance
- Actinometer
- Aerosol
- Angstrom exponent
- Attenuation coefficient
- Beer–Lambert law
- Pyranometer
- Radiative transfer
- Sun photometer
- Transparency and translucency
