= Ballad of Eric =

The "Ballad of Eric" (Swedish: "Eriksvisan") is a ballad found in Latin and Swedish about the Gothic king, Eric. It was once seen as a source for Migration Period history but is now regarded as an inauthentic piece of fakelore created during the 16th century.

== Contents ==
The ballad was published for the first time in Latin by Johannes Magnus in his Historia de omnibus Gothorum Sueonumque regibus (1554). While his reliability may be called into question, Johannes Magnus claims that the original was a song widely sung in Sweden at the time. The Latin text is composed of ten Sapphic stanzas. It tells the story of King Eric, whose career bears some similarities to a later king Berig whom Magnus claimed united the Swedes and Goths 400 years after Eric. Berig is also found in the Jordanes' 6th-century work Getica. According to the text, Eric, the first king of the Goths, sent troops southwards to a country named Vetala, where no one had yet cultivated the land. In their company, there was a wise man, a law speaker, who was to uphold the law. Finally, the Gothic king Humli sent his son Dan to rule the settlers, and after Dan, Vetala was named Denmark. The first stanza says:

Primus in regnis Geticis coronam
Regiam gessi, subiique Regis
Munus, & mores colui sereno

Principe dignos.

The Swedish text is found in two different versions. One of them is found in Elaus Terserus' translation of Johannes Magnus' work, a translation that was completed by 1611 but never published. The other is found in Ericus Schroderus' translation of the same work, which was published in 1620. His version consists of ten five-line stanzas with the rhyme scheme ababC, where refrain C says "He was Vetala's first harvest." There are also several later, unfinished documents of this song. One of them is found in Olof Verelius' work, in the annotations of the Hervarar saga ok Heiðreks, and the other one in Johan Hadorph's work (1690). Both of the versions are closely similar to Schroderus' version. Hadorph relates that the Eric song was still widely sung among the peasantry of Västergötland and Dalsland in the late 17th century.

In 1825, Erik Gustaf Geijer of the Geatish Society reproduced parts of the song. A figure of immense authority in Swedish academia, Geijer regarded the ballad an ancient, traditional text. In an analysis of the song's strikingly archaic language in his 1848 Ph.D. thesis, Carl Säve believed that the use of I and u instead of e and o indicated that it was first written down with the runic script. In 1853, Gunnar Olof Hyltén-Cavallius and George Stephens followed Säve, oblivious to or dismissive of P. A. Munch's argument that the ballad was dependent on the Prosaic Chronicle and suggestion that it was composed ca 1449 or 1450.

Henrik Schück initially accepted Munch's reasoning. Later changing his mind, Schück argued in 1891 that everyone involved in the work's presentation lied about its wide currency, and that it was composed by Johannes Magnus himself. Subsequently, only Einar Nylén (1924) attempted to argue that a Swedish version existed before Johannes Magnus, and his view was rejected or ignored in subsequent scholarship.
