= Gothicism =

Swedish cultural movement

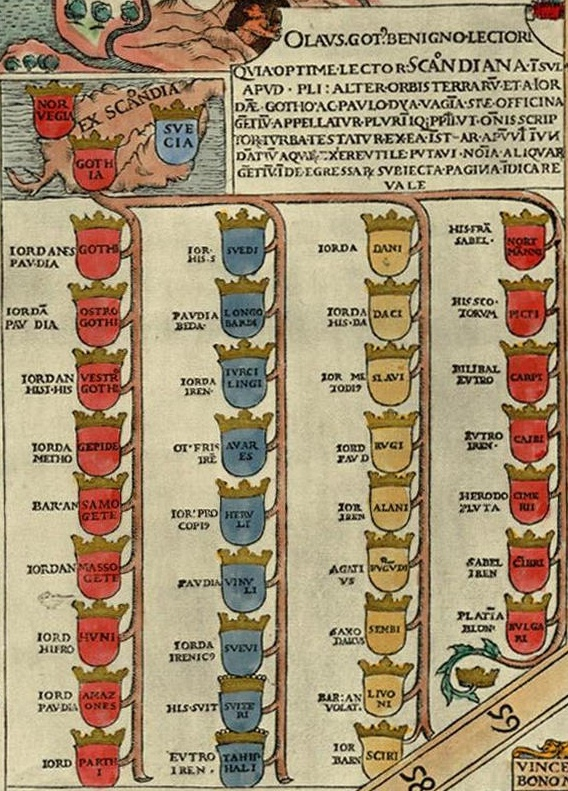
Table of tribes originating from Scandinavia according to Johannes and Olaus Magnus, with references to Jordanes, Paulus Diaconus, etc.

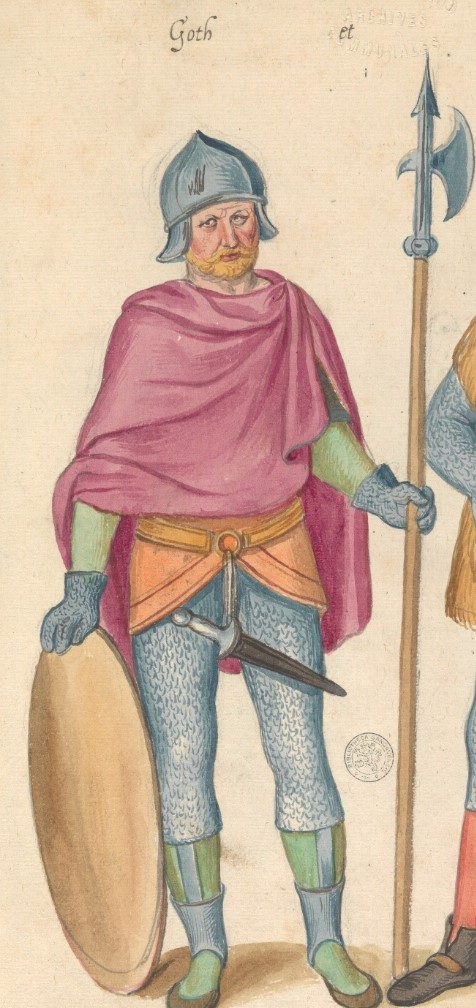
A 16th century perception of a Goth, illustrated in the manuscript "Théâtre de tous les peuples et nations de la terre avec leurs habits et ornemens divers, tant anciens que modernes, diligemment depeints au naturel". Painted by Lucas d'Heere in the 2nd half of the 16th century. Preserved in the Ghent University Library.

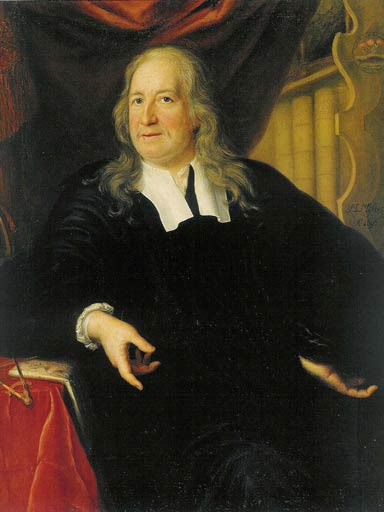
Olof Rudbeck, a 17th-century spokesman for Gothicismus.

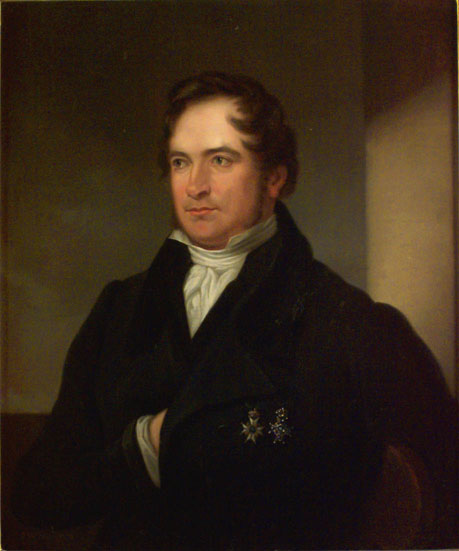
Erik Gustaf Geijer was a member of the 19th-century Gothic League (or the Geatish Society), which propagated the now-familiar image of the Viking as a heroic Norseman.

Gothicism or Gothism (Swedish: göticism Swedish pronunciation: [ˈjøːtɪsˌɪsm]; Latin: Gothicismus) was an ethno-cultural ideology and cultural movement in Sweden, which took honor in being a Swede, for being purportedly related to the Goths. This was a result of a resolute decades long effort from Swedish writers, scholars and historical revisionists alike dedicated towards proving that the Goths had originated from Götaland and wherefrom their name was etymologically derived. This premise, however, has been heavily contested and met with scepticism by a number of eminent historians such as Carlo Troya who is esteemed as a leading figure on Italian history during the early middle ages. The founders of the movement were Nicolaus Ragvaldi and the brothers Johannes and Olaus Magnus. The belief continued to hold power in the 17th century, when Sweden was a great power following the Thirty Years' War, but lost most of its sway in the 18th. It was renewed by the Viking revival and Romantic nationalism in the early 19th century, this time with the Vikings as heroic figures.

== Origins ==
The name is derived from the Gothicists' belief that the Goths had originated from Sweden, based on Jordanes' account of a Gothic urheimat in Scandinavia (Scandza). The Gothicists took pride in the Gothic tradition that the Ostrogoths and their king Theodoric the Great, who assumed power in the Roman Empire, had Scandinavian ancestry. This pride was expressed as early as the medieval chronicles, where chroniclers wrote about the Goths as the ancestors of the Scandinavians, and the idea was used by Nicolaus Ragvaldi at the Council of Basel to argue that the Swedish monarchy was the foremost in Europe. It also permeated the writings of the Swedish writer Johannes Magnus (Historia de omnibus Gothorum Sueonumque regibus) as well as those of his brother Olaus Magnus (Historia de gentibus septentrionalibus). Both had a strong influence on contemporary scholarship in Sweden.

Some scholars in Denmark attempted to identify the Goths with the Jutes; however, these ideas did not lead to the same widespread cultural movement in Danish society as it did in the Swedish. In contrast with the Swedes, the Danes of this era did not forward claims to political legitimacy based on assertions that their country was the original homeland of the Goths or that the conquest of the Roman Empire was proof of their own country's military valour and power through history.

During the 17th century, Danes and Swedes competed for the collection and publication of Icelandic manuscripts, Norse sagas, and the two Eddas. In Sweden, the Icelandic manuscripts became part of an origin myth and were seen as proof that the greatness and heroism of the ancient Geats had been passed down through the generations to the current population. This pride culminated in the publication of Olaus Rudbeck's treatise Atland eller Manheim (1679–1702), in which he claimed that Sweden was identical to Atlantis.

== Romantic nationalism ==
During the 18th century, Swedish Gothicism had sobered somewhat, but it revived during the period of Romantic nationalism from c. 1800 onwards, with Erik Gustaf Geijer and Esaias Tegnér in the Geatish Society.

In Denmark, Romantic nationalism led writers such as Johannes Ewald, N. F. S. Grundtvig (whose translation of Beowulf into Danish was the first into a modern language) and Adam Gottlob Oehlenschläger to take a renewed interest in Old Norse subjects. In other parts of Europe, interest in Norse mythology, history and language was represented by the Englishmen Thomas Gray, John Keats and William Wordsworth, and the Germans Johann Gottfried Herder and Friedrich Gottlieb Klopstock.

== Architecture ==
In Scandinavian architecture, Gothicism had its prime in the 1860s and 1870s, but it continued until c. 1900. The interest in Old Norse subjects led to the creation of a special architecture in wood inspired by stave churches, and it was in Norway that the style had its largest impact. The details that are often found in this style are dragon heads, from which it is often called dragon style, false arcades, lathed colonnades, protruding lofts and a ridged roof.

== See also ==
- Götaland theory
- Name of the Goths
- Hyperborea § Identification as Hyperboreans
- Dacianism
- Sarmatism
