= Swedish Romantic literature =

Romantic Period

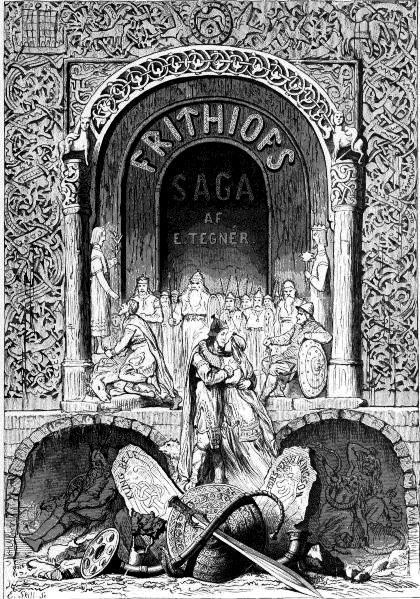
Title illustration of Esaias Tegnér's Frithiof's Saga (1876 ed.)

Swedish Romantic literature denotes Swedish literature between 1809 and 1830. In Europe, the period from circa 1805–1840 is known as Romanticism. It was also strongly featured in Sweden, based on German influences. During this relatively short period, there were so many great Swedish poets, that the era is referred to as the Golden Age of Swedish poetry. The period started around 1810 when several periodicals were published that contested the literature of the 18th century. An important society was the Gothic Society (1811), and their periodical Iduna, a romanticised retrospect to Gothicismus.

One significant reason was that several poets for the first time worked towards a common direction. Four of the main romantic poets that made significant contributions to the movements were: the professor of history Erik Gustaf Geijer, the loner Erik Johan Stagnelius, professor of Greek language Esaias Tegnér and professor of aesthetics and philosophy P.D.A. Atterbom.

Geijer (1783–1847) was one of the earliest and most prominent members of the neo-gothicist Gothic Society. As a professor he published two cultural-historical works: Svea rikes hävder and Svenska folkets historia, where he gave support to the idea of the Viking Age being a cultural height that was suppressed during the Middle Ages. Stagnelius (1793–1823) spent his short adult years living as an outsider in Stockholm. Many of his poems deal with the beauty in nature, encompassing the loneliness of the soul, and it is both for his beauty and his mysticism that Stagnelius's works were to attain recognition. The fame of Atterbom (1790–1855) comes from his flower poetry: Lycksalighetens ö ("Island of Bliss"), 1824–1827, and a collection of poetry called Blommorna.

Esaias Tegnér (1782–1846) has been described as the first modern Swedish man, in the sense that very much is known about both his life and his person, and that he left an extensive correspondence. His greatest success was Frithiof's Saga (1820–1825), a romanticized version of the Icelandic sagas but in a modern dress. The work was translated into several languages, put to music in Sweden, where it had status of a national epos until the realism of the 1880s obsoleted it.

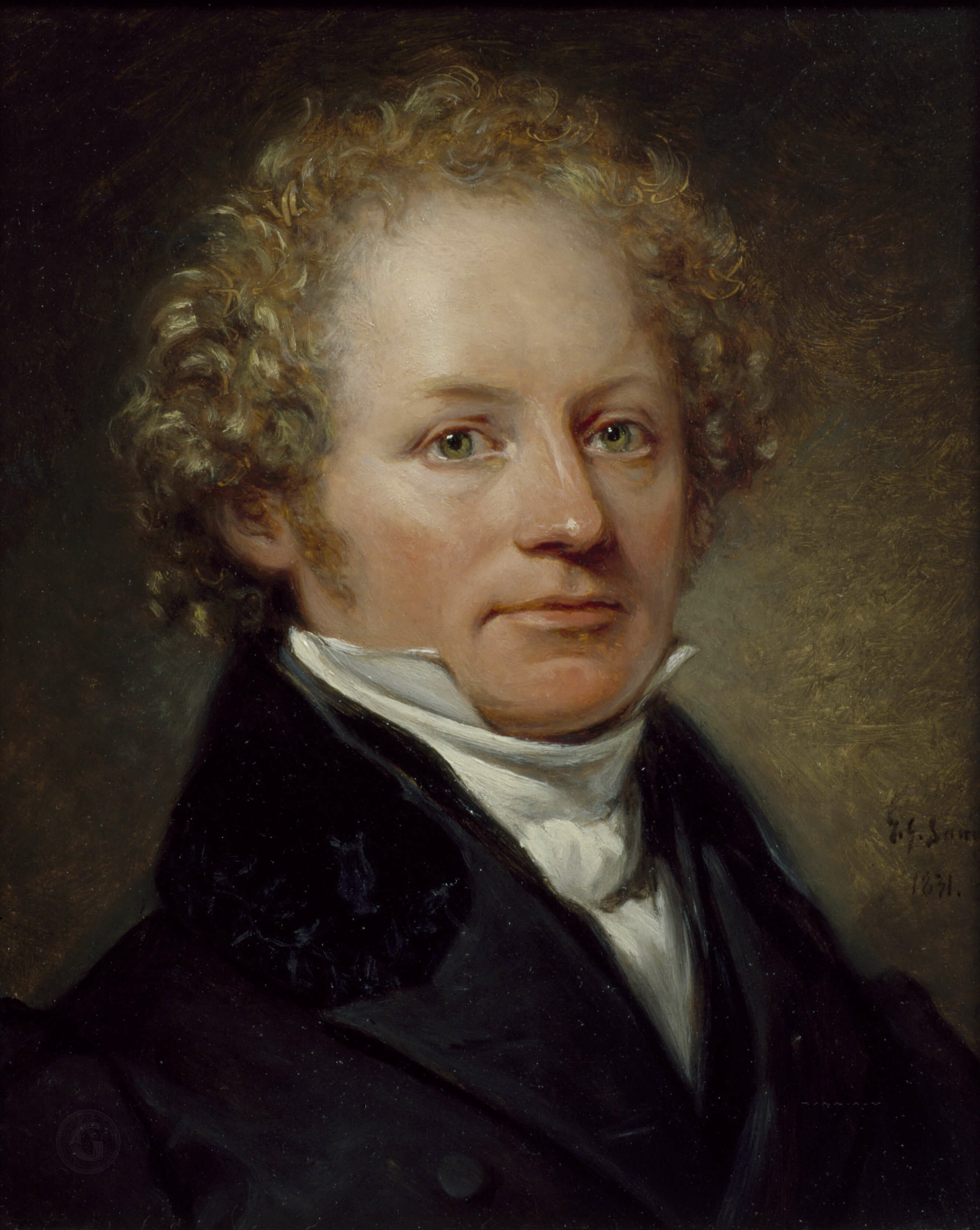
Atterbom, 1831

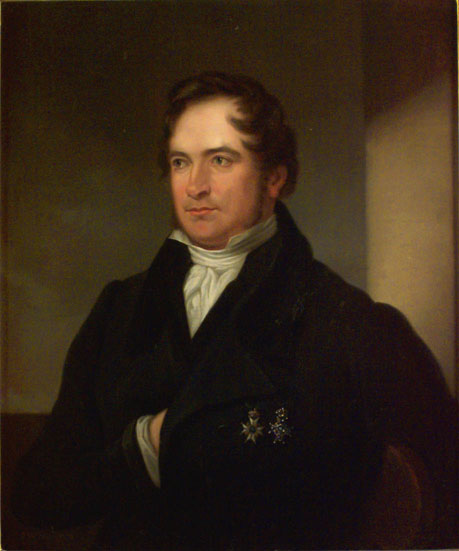
Geijer

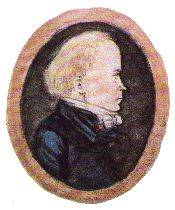
Stagnelius, posthumous medallion

== Early liberalism ==
Fredrika Bremer (1801–1865) was the first writer of the Swedish realist novel, in the spirit of Jane Austen, and her most important contribution is that she introduced the novel in Swedish on a large scale. Her most important novel was her last: Hertha, in 1856. Hertha is not so much a novel as it is a political debate of women's rights.

Viktor Rydberg (1828–1895) was a key figure in Swedish culture between 1855 and the modern breakthrough in 1879. In the spirit of Dickens, Rydberg wrote adventurous novels and stories that in reality were dealing with the poor and exposed people of society. Several works tried to define a world where Christianity became integrated with humanistic ideals of ancient Greece. Rydberg was also noted for groundbreaking historical and theological works.

When Sweden lost Finland in 1809, Finnish literature moved in its own direction. For the remainder of the 19th century however, it was still the educated Swedish speaking minority in Finland that authored most of Finland's literature. A key figure was the Swedish speaking Johan Ludvig Runeberg (1804–1877), was established himself as Finland's national poet, a distinction he has kept into modern times. His most important work was The Tales of Ensign Stål (1848–1860), an epic poem about the Finnish War (1808–1809), the first verse of which became Finland's national anthem. After Runeberg, it was Zacharius Topelius (1818–1898) who took the role of national Finnish author. Although he wrote both novels and poetry, his most important contributions were children's books with Läsning för barn (Reading for Children, 1865–1896).

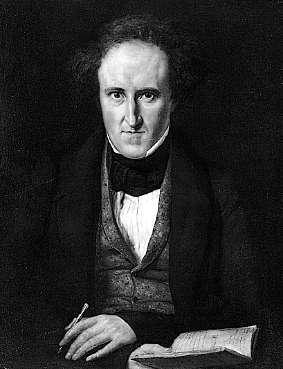
Almqvist, circa 1835

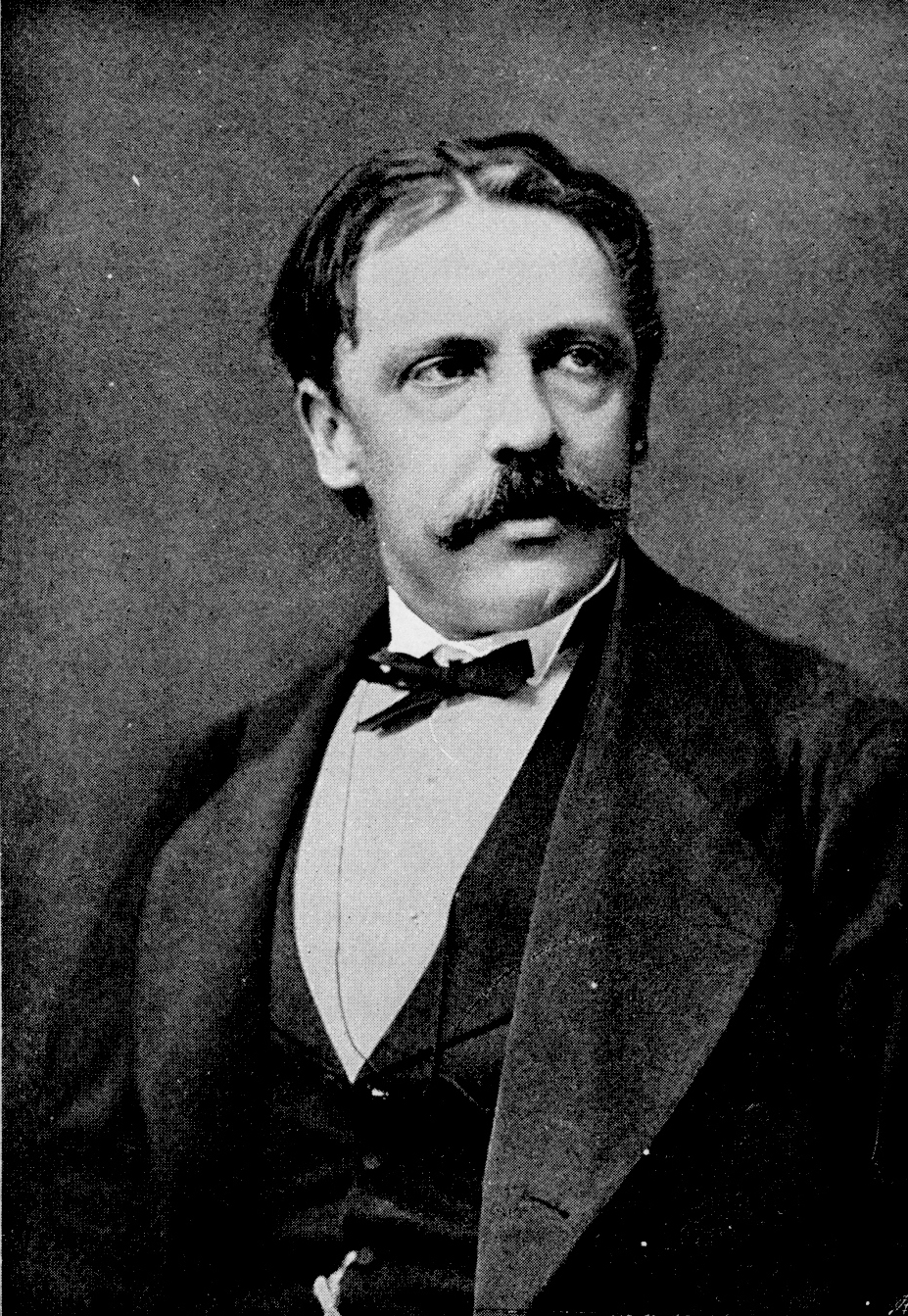
Rydberg, 1876

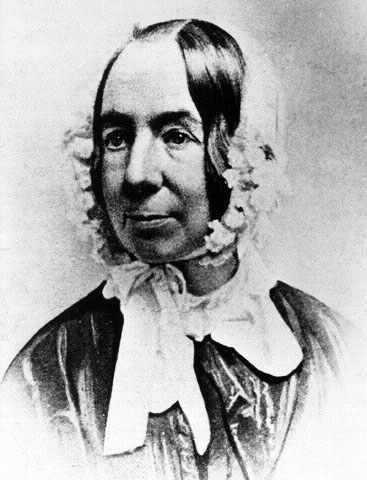
Fredrika Bremer, 1849

== Notes and references ==
- Algulin, Ingemar, A History of Swedish Literature, published by the Swedish Institute, 1989. ISBN 91-520-0239-X
- Gustafson, Alrik A History of Swedish Literature (2 volumes), 1961.
- Tigerstedt, E.N., Svensk litteraturhistoria (Tryckindustri AB, Solna, 1971)
