= Malla Silfverstolpe =

Swedish writer and salon hostess (1782–1861)

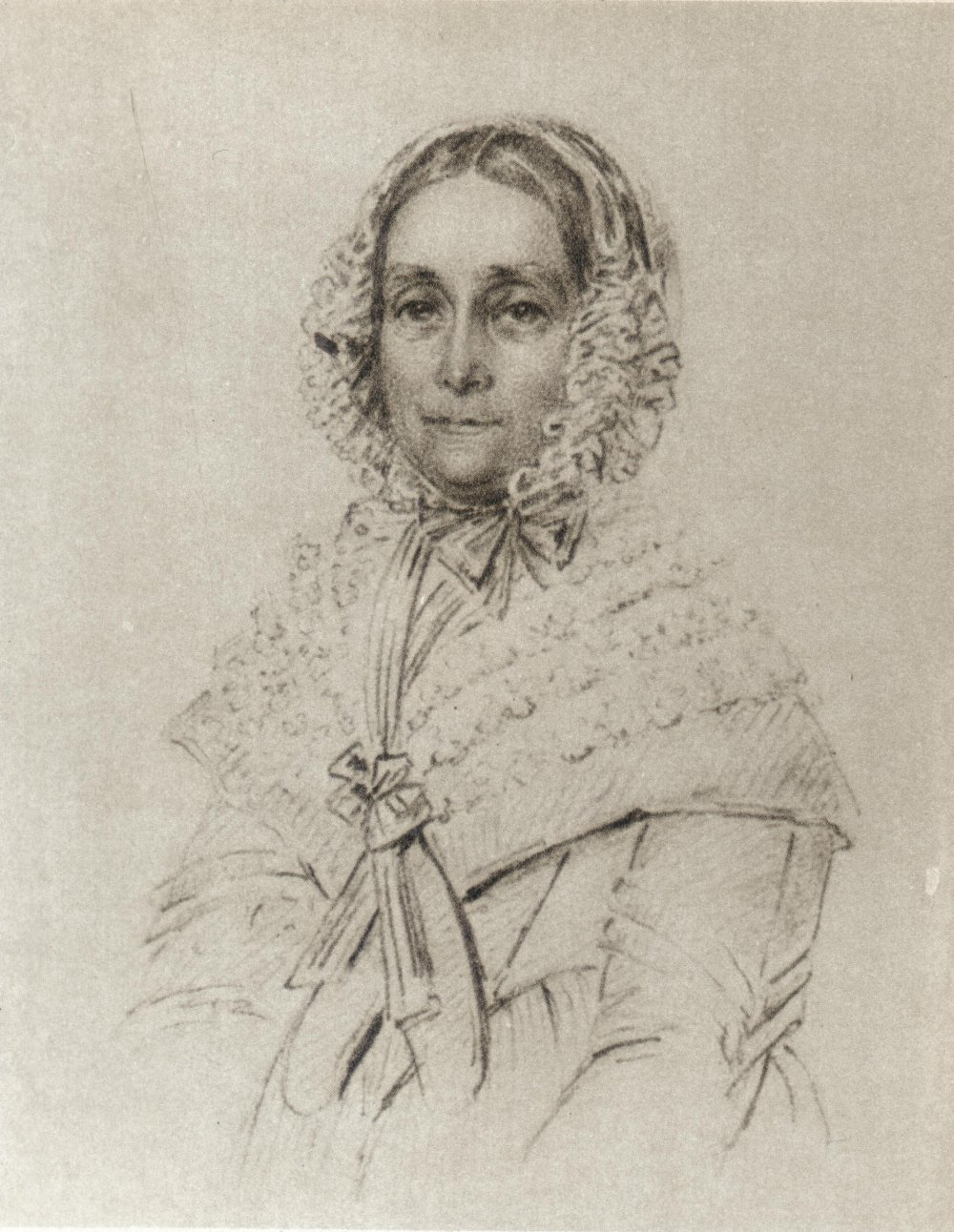
Malla Silfverstolpe by Maria Röhl in 1843.

Magdalena Sofia "Malla" Silfverstolpe (née Montgomery; 8 February 1782 – 17 January 1861) was a Swedish writer and salon hostess. Her house in Uppsala was a meeting place for many prominent writers, composers and intellectuals. Her diaries, published in four parts between 1908 and 1911, offer a unique insight into the lives of those who formed part of her circle.

== Biography ==
Silfverstolpe's father, Robert Montgomery, was commissioned into the French army in 1754 and by 1777 had achieved the rank of colonel. Serving in the County of Nyland and Tavastehus, in modern-day Finland, he married Charlotte Rudbeck in 1781. Rudbeck died in April 1782, two months after their daughter was born; Montgomery returned to Sweden with his daughter in 1783. Montgomery was held in high regard by Gustav III at the time of his return. That changed in 1789 when he was sentenced to death for his involvement in the Anjala conspiracy—the sentence was not carried out and he remained in prison until his release in 1793. Silfverstolpe was raised by her maternal grandmother in Edsberg, Sollentuna during the period of her father's imprisonment.

Silfverstolpe was married to David Gudmund Silfverstolpe, a colonel in the Swedish General Staff, in 1807; the marriage was not a happy one. Her husband suffered from repeated bouts of "mjältsjuka"—an illness that, though then associated with the spleen ("mjälte" being the Swedish word for the organ), might now be diagnosed as depression. The couple moved to Uppsala in 1812 and Silfverstolpe was widowed in 1819.

In 1820, Silfverstolpe, inspired by the prominent women of Paris, began running her Friday night salon. Silfverstolpe's salon welcomed leading figures in Swedish science, literature and high society and even hosted influential foreign visitors to the country. The salon was a powerful presence within the culture of Sweden for two decades and was the centre of the country's romantic movement. Aside from her support for romantic poets and novelists, Silfverstolpe was also a patron to a number of songwriters, including Per Ulrik Kernell and Adolf Fredrik Lindblad.

Silfverstolpe, who had kept diaries throughout her life, began writing her memoirs from 1822 following Kernell's insistent suggestion. Excerpts from these were eventually released in four parts from 1908 to 1911, a second edition was published in 1914. The memoirs are rich in personal and historical detail. Silfverstolpe described Sweden and many of her most famous contemporaries with great tact and familiarity. Her writings provide an important contemporary account of figures such as Carl Jonas Love Almqvist, Per Daniel Amadeus Atterbom, Erik Gustaf Geijer, Lindblad, Anders Fredrik Skjöldebrand, Esaias Tegnér, Adolf Törneros and Johan Olof Wallin.

Numerous contemporaries of Silfverstolpe dedicated poetry to her; these include Atterbom, Geijer and Wallin. There is also a road named after her in Sollentuna Municipality—Malla Silfverstolpes väg—upon which is Rudbeckskolan (a school named after her maternal family).

== See also ==
- Fredrika Limnell

== Sources ==
- Nordisk familjebok, Silfverstolpe, 1904–1926.
- Gabriel Anrep, Svenska adelns Ättar-taflor
- Österberg, Carin et al., Svenska kvinnor: föregångare, nyskapare. Lund: Signum 1990. (ISBN 91-87896-03-6)
- Riksarkivet SBL Magdalena (Malla) S Montgomery
