= Historia de omnibus Gothorum Sueonumque regibus =

1554 book by Johannes Magnus

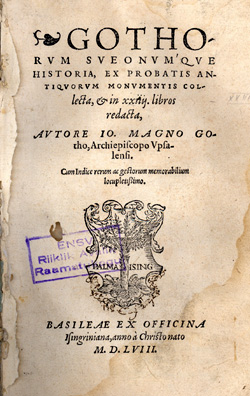
Frontispiece of the 1558 edition of the Historia, published in Basel.

The Historia de omnibus Gothorum Sueonumque regibus ("History of all the kings of the Geats and the Swedes") is a posthumously published, partly pseudo-historical work by Johannes Magnus, Sweden's last Catholic archbishop. In 1554 (ten years after his death), it was published in Latin by his brother Olaus Magnus.

The Historia was implicitly critical of King Gustav Vasa, who had introduced the Protestant Reformation in 1527 and caused the exile of Johannes Magnus. It was nevertheless used widely by Gustav Vasa's sons and successors, to whom it had been dedicated, since it extolled the glorious past of the Swedish kingdom. In particular, the sons used the (fictitious) king-list which began with Magog, grandson of Noah. As a consequence, Eric XIV and Charles IX adopted much higher regnal numbers than warranted by the historical sources. A Swedish translation was published by Ericus Benedicti Schroderus in 1620. A modern Swedish version, translated by Kurt Johannesson and with comments by Johannesson and Hans Helander, was published in 2018 by Michaelisgillet and the Royal Swedish Academy of Letters, History and Antiquities.

== Content ==
=== Book One ===
The book opens up with the creation of the world, around 3960 years before the birth of Christ. Noah sets up his three sons Shem, Ham, and Japheth to govern Asia, Africa, and Europe, respectively. Citing Flavius Josephus, Johannes says that a son of Japheth, Magog, is the father of the Scythian peoples (which Johannes identifies as the Goths and in turn the Geats), and at first rules over “that part of European Scythia now called Finland”. Eighty-eight years after the Deluge, however, Magog and a great number of people cross the Baltic Sea and reach Götaland on the Scandinavian Peninsula, which Magog settles and makes his new seat of power, thus becoming the first King of Sweden. This assertion, Johannes explains, is supported by “our fatherland's most reliable chronicles”.

Of Magog's five sons, Suenno and Gethar are set up to rule over (and give their names to) the Swedes and Geats, respectively, while the younger brothers Thor, German, and Ubbo help administer their brother's domains. When Suenno dies around 246 years after the flood, Ubbo becomes ruler of the Swedes, and he builds the city of Uppsala to be his seat of power, its etymology being the Halls of Ubbo. Ubbo is succeeded by Siggo I, who builds the city of Sigtuna by Lake Mälaren as a fortress against the Estonians, Finns, and “other peoples in the East”. Already by this point, the runic alphabet has been invented, which Johannes claims are older than both the Greek and Latin alphabets.

While Siggo rules over the Swedes, a man named Eric has been elected King of the Geats. Johannes describes Eric as a man who became renowned for his "good customs" and his "love for the Fatherland", and reproduces a song about the King which he claims dates back from the oldest of times, though latter-day scholars believe it more likely to be a composition of Johannes himself. Already by this point, the Geatish population has grown to such an extent that the Scandinavian Peninsula can no longer support them, and to solve this problem, Eric expels all rebels in his realm to isles in the west, where they become the Danes.

After Eric's death in around 425 years after the Deluge, the Golden Age quickly comes to an end, and the Scandinavian peoples soon are converted to paganism. The temple at Uppsala is constructed, “built in such grandeur that all in its walls, roofs, and pillars seemed to be shining of purest gold”. Drawing on Saxo Grammaticus, Johannes gives a brief description of the gods in Norse mythology, which he says are related to the gods of the Roman religion. Over the next four hundred years, the amicable relations between Swedes and Geats deteriorate, and Johannes mentions the kings Uddo, Alo, Odin, Charles, Björn, and Gethar as rulers, of whom he writes that no knowledge has survived, save their names.

Identifying as he does the Geats with the Goths, the author now starts drawing on the Getica of Jordanes, and declares that in around 836 years after the Deluge, Berig, a mythical king of the Goths from the aforementioned work, is unanimously elected king by both the Swedes and the Geats, reuniting the two peoples. Concerned about how Finns, Curonians, and Ulmerugians have been raiding Sweden, Berig rallies the people for a war of conquest against the tribes across the Baltic Sea to seek vengeance and to regain the national honour. Appointing his eldest son Humulphus to rule in his absence, Berig assembles a mighty fleet and sails to the isle called Gothiscandza by Jordanes, which Johannes identifies as Gotland. From thence, they proceed to invade the land of the Ulmerugians, which Johannes identifies as the territory which would later become Prussia. Though the Ulmerguians put up a brave fight, they eventually realize that their forces are inferior to those of the Geats, and so burn their homes and fields and flee into "inner Vandalia". Though the land now is desolate, the Geats nonetheless colonizes it, as well as the neighbouring provinces of Pomerania, Poland, and Mecklenburg.

Johannes goes on to invent a list of rulers with six Erics before Eric the Victorious and six Charles before Charles VII. In that way the 16th-century monarchs Eric XIV and Charles IX could boast with ordinal numbers on par with the popes. These fictitious rulers were usually described in positive terms, but the invented King Gostagus (Ostanus, Östen III, number 90 in the list) is referred to as a tyrant: "There was hardly a night throughout the year with him abstaining from fornication, rape, incest and the filthiest sexual intercourse". The account of Gostagus contains hateful hints about Gustav Vasa. The strongly patriotic work also displays strong antipathy towards Denmark.

== List of Swedish monarchs appearing in the Historia ==
Woodcut by Petter Lorens Hoffbro from ca. 1750 illustrating many of the monarchs appearing in the Historia, as well as all subsequent monarchs from Gustav I up to Gustav III.

The list includes various rulers from the Hervarar and Ynglinga saga as well as several legendary Nordic and Gothic heroes, albeit in different chronological order. All pre-12th century dates there are approximates, as stated throughout the book.

No.	King	Swedish name	Accession
1	Magog	Magog	2216 BC
2	Suenno	Sven	
3	Gethar	Getar I	
4	Ubbo	Ubbe	2058 BC
5	Siggo	Sigge	
6	Ericus	Erik I	1947 BC
7	Uddo	Udde	1879 BC
8	Alo	Ale	
9	Othen	Odin	
10	Carolus	Karl I	
11	Biorno	Björn I	
12	Gethar	Getar II	
13	Gertho	Gert	
14	Berico	Berik	1468 BC
15	Humulphus	Humulf	
16	Humelus	Humel	
17	Gothilas	Gottila	
18	Sigthunius	Sigtun	
19	Scarinus	Skarin	
20	Sibdagerus	Sibdager	
21	Asmundus	Asmund	
22	Uffo	Uffe	
23	Hunigus	Hunding	
24	Regnerus	Regnar	
25	Hothebrotus	Hotbrot	
26	Attilus	Adils I	
27	Hotherus	Höder	
28	Rodericus	Rörik	
29	Attilus	Adils II	
30	Botuildus	Botvild	
31	Carolus	Karl II	
32	Grimerus	Grimmer	
33	Tordo	Tord I	
34	Gotharus	Gotar I	
35	Adulphus	Adolf	
36	Algothus	Algot I	
37	Ericus	Erik II	
38	Lindormus	Lindorm	
39	Gefsillus	Gestill	
40	Ericus "Diserti"	Erik III the Eloquent	34 BC
41	Getricus	Götrik	4 AD
42	Haldanus	Haldan I	
43	Vilmerus	Vilmer	
44	Nordianus	Nordian	
45	Sivardus	Sivard I	
46	Carolus	Karl III	
47	Ericus	Erik IV	
48	Haldanus	Haldan II	
49	Euginus	Evgin	
50	Ragnaldus	Ragnald	
51	Amunudus	Amund I	
52	Hacho	Hake	
53	Sivardus	Sivard II	
54	Ingo	Inge I	
55	Nearchus	Neark	
56	Frotho	Frode	
57	Urbarus	Urbar	
58	Ostenus	Östen I	
59	Fliolmus	Fliolm (Fjölner)	
60	Svercherus	Sverker I	
61	Valander	Valand	
62	Visbur	Visbur	
63	Domalde	Domald	
64	Domarus	Domar	
65	Attilus	Adils III	
66	Dignerus	Digner	
67	Dagerus	Dager	
68	Alaricus "Alverum"	Alarik, Alver	
69	Ingemarus "Ingo"	Ingemar I	
70	Ingellus	Ingel	
71	Germundus	Germund	
72	Haquinus Ringo	Håkan I Ring	
73	Egillus	Egil "Vendelkråka"	
74	Gotharus	Gotar II	
75	Fatho	Faste	
76	Gudmudus	Gudmund	
77	Adelus	Adel	
78	Ostanus	Östen II	
79	Ingemarus "Canutus"	Ingemar II, Knut	
80	Holstanus	Holsten	
81	Biorno	Björn II	
82	Raualdus	Ravald	464 AD
83	Suartmanus	Svartman	481 AD
84	Tordo	Tord II	509 AD
85	Rodulphus	Rodulf	
86	Hathinus	Hatin	
87	Attilus	Adils IV	
88	Tordo	Tord III	
89	Algothus	Algot II	
90	Oftanus "Gostagus"	Östen III (Gostag)	
91	Arthus	Artus	630 AD
92	Haquinus	Håkan II	
93	Carolus	Karl IV	
94	Carolus	Karl V	
95	Birgerus	Birger I	
96	Ericus	Erik V	
97	Torillus	Torill	
98	Biornus	Björn III	764 AD
99	Alaricus	Alrik	
100	Biornus	Björn IV	800 AD
101	Bratemundus	Bratemund	
102	Sivardus	Sivard III	
103	Herotus	Herod	
104	Carolus	Karl VI	
105	Biornus	Björn V	
106	Ingevallus "Ingellus"	Ingevald	
107	Olaus	Olof Trätälja	
108	Ingo	Inge II	
109	Ericus "a Ventoso"	Erik VI Väderhatt; Eric Weatherhat	
110	Ericus "Victoriosus"	Erik VII Segersäll; Eric the Victorious	
111	Ericus Aorfel "Stenchillus"	Erik Årsäll / Stenkil	
112	Olaus Schotkonung	Olof Skötkonung	~970 AD
113	Amundus	Anund Jacob	1018 AD
114	Amundus	Emund the Old	
115	Haquinus	Håkan Röde	13 years
116	Stenchillus	Stenkil	
117	Ingo	Inge III	
118	Halstanus	Halsten	
119	Philippus	Philip	1080 AD
120	Ingo	Inge IV	
121	Ragualdus	Ragnvald II	1139 AD
122	Magnus	Magnus I	
123	Suercherus	Sverker II	
124	Ericus "Sancti"	Erik IX den helige Eric the Saint	1150 AD
	Magnus	Magnus II Henriksson	1160 AD
125	Carolus	Karl VII Sverkersson	1160 AD
126	Canutus	Knut Eriksson	1168 AD
127	Suercherus	Sverker III	1192 AD
128	Ericus	Erik X Knutsson	1210 AD
129	Ioannes	Johan I	1216 AD
130	Ericus "Blesus Balbus"	Erik XI läspe & halte Eric the Lame and Lisp	1220 AD
	Canutus	Knut II	1229 AD
131	Valdemarus	Valdemar	1250 AD
132	Magnus Ladalos	Magnus III Ladulås	1277 AD
133	Birgerus	Birger Magnusson	1290 AD
134	Magnus	Magnus IV Eriksson	1319 AD
	Ericus	Erik XII Magnusson	
	Haquinus	Håkon (VI of Norway)	
135	Albertus	Albrekt	1363 AD
136	Margareta	Margrethe I	1395 AD
137	Ericus Pomeranus	Erik XIII av Pommer	1412 AD
138	Christophorus	Christopher	1442 AD
139	Carolus Canuti	Karl VIII Knutsson	1448 AD
140	Steno Sture senior	Sten Sture the Elder	1470 AD
141	Svanto	Svante Nilsson	1504 AD
142	Steno Sture junior	Sten Sture the Younger	1512 AD
143	Gostavus	Gustav Vasa	1520 AD
