= Carta marina =

Map of the Nordic countries

Carta marina et descriptio septentrionalium terrarium (Latin) English: Marine map and description of the Northern lands
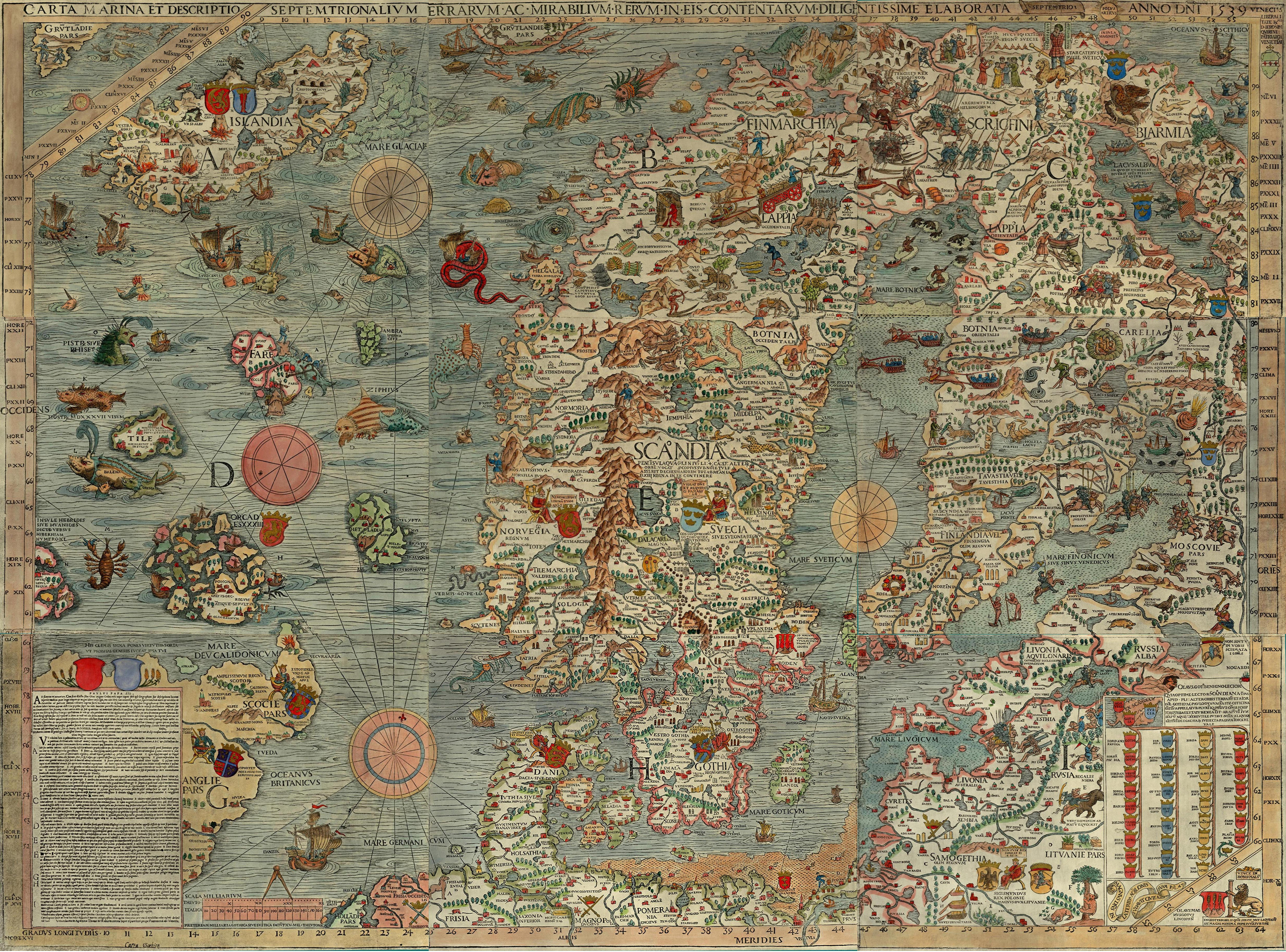
- Composite from 1949 facsimile

Carta marina et descriptio septentrionalium terrarum (Latin for Marine map and description of the Northern lands; commonly abbreviated Carta marina) is the first map of the Nordic countries to give details and place names. It was created by the Swedish ecclesiastic Olaus Magnus and initially published in 1539. Only two earlier maps of the Nordic countries are known, those of Jacob Ziegler (Strasbourg, 1532) and Claudius Clavus (15th century).

The map is centred on Scandia, which is shown in the largest size text on the map and placed in the middle of Sweden. The map covers the Nordic lands of "Svecia" (Svealand) and "Gothia" (Götaland) (both areas in Sweden), "Norvegia" (Norway), Dania (Denmark), "Fare" (Faroe Islands), Islandia (Iceland), Finlandia (Finland), Lituania (Lithuania), Livonia (Estonia and Latvia), and "pars" (parts of) "Scotie" (Scotland; including Orkney and Shetland) and "Anglie" (England). The map is framed with longitudes and latitudes running from 55°N to the Arctic Circle. The sea is filled with numerous animals, many recognisable, including various whales and walrus.

The map is 1.70 m wide by 1.25 m tall and was printed in black and white from nine 55 × 40 cm woodcut blocks sequenced from west to east and north to south, and identified in the centre with the letters A to I.

== History ==
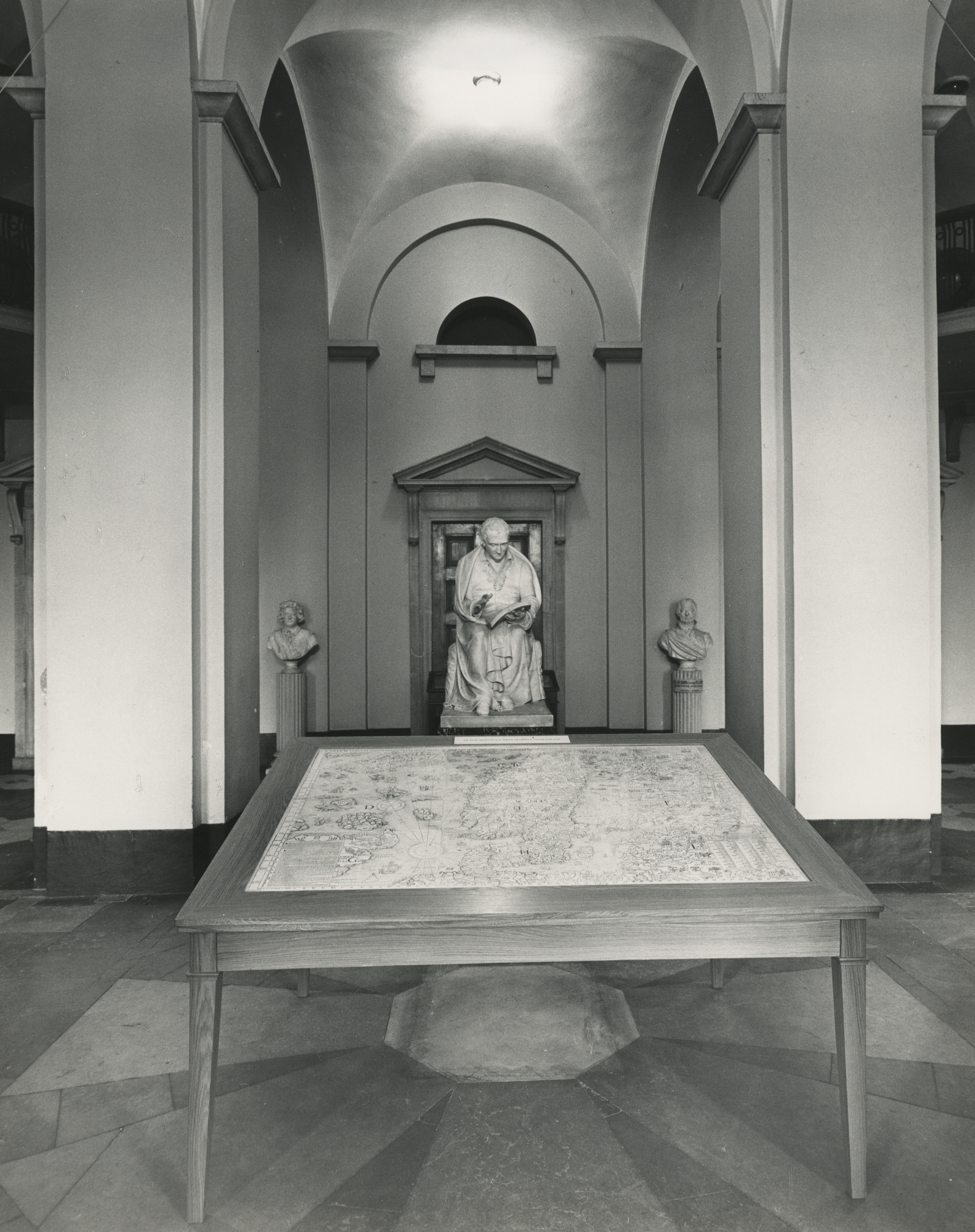
Carta Marina on display at Carolina Rediviva.

The map was created in Rome from 1527 to 1539 by Olaus Magnus (1490–1557), who arrived on a diplomatic visit for the Swedish government and stayed on, likely because his brother Johannes Magnus became involved in a religious feud with King Gustav I of Sweden.

To construct the map, Magnus drew from a variety of ancient sources including Ptolemy's map in Geographia, and contemporary sources such as the work of Astronomer Jacob Ziegler. In addition to cartographic sources, Magnus also relied on the descriptions of sailors and his own observations.

The map took 12 years to make, and its first copies were printed in 1539 in Venice.

Olaus complemented the map with Historia de gentibus septentrionalibus ("A description of the Northern peoples") printed in Rome, 1555. The Latin notes were translated by Olaus into Italian (1565) and German (1567).

== Surviving copies ==
Carta Marina greyscale original in Uppsala

All of the original copies of the map passed out of public knowledge after 1574, and the map was largely forgotten, perhaps because few copies were printed, and Pope Paul III asserted a 10-year "copyright". It was later widely questioned whether the map had ever existed.

In 1886, Oscar Brenner found a copy at the Hof- und Staatsbibliothek in Munich, where it currently resides. In 1961, another copy was found in Switzerland, brought to Sweden the following year by the Uppsala University Library; as of 2007, it is stored there at the Carolina Rediviva library. The copies differ slightly from each other.

== Adaptations ==
A scaled-down adaptation of the Uppsala or a similar copy was printed in Rome by Antoine Lafréry in 1572.

== See also ==
- Anders Bure, founder of Swedish cartography
- Martin Waldseemüller, who had created a similar map of the world in 1516 with the same title
- Sea Swine, a mythical creature featured in the Carta marina
