= Sea pig =

Sea pig or seapig may refer to:

== Animals ==
- Scotoplanes, a genus of deep-sea holothurians (sea cucumbers) commonly called sea pigs
- An obsolete name for the Eastern smooth boxfish
- Sea Swine (a.k.a. Porcus Marinus), a historical name for porpoise and mythical creatures
- A local name for the dugong
- The name of guinea pigs in some countries
- Hawaiian flagtail, sometimes called puaʻa kai (sea pig)

== Other uses ==
- "The Sea Pig", an episode from the PBS series Songs For Unusual Creatures by Michael Hearst
