= Adolf Fredrik Lindblad =

Swedish composer (1801–1878)

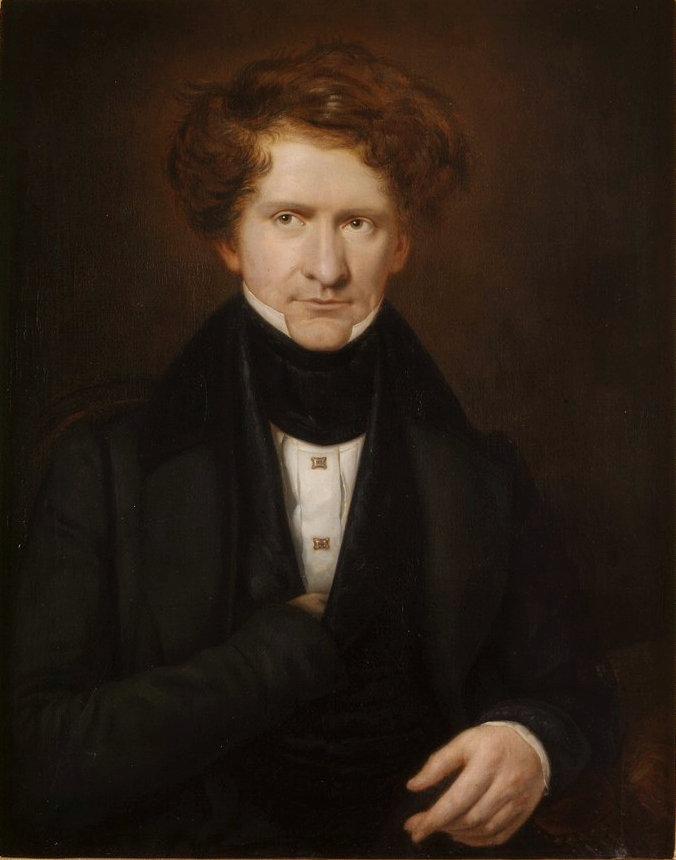
Adolf Fredrik Lindblad; by Carl Peter Mazer (1835)

Adolf Fredrik Lindblad (1 February 1801 – 23 August 1878) was a Swedish composer from the Romantic era. He is mostly known for his compositions of Swedish song or lieder, of which he produced over 200. His other well-known compositions include his Symphony No. 1 in C major, Symphony No. 2 in D major, and an opera titled Frondörerna (The Rebels). He was a well-respected friend of Felix Mendelssohn, and had a collaborative relationship with the famous Swedish soprano, Jenny Lind.

== Biography ==
Born of an “unknown father” in the town of Skänninge on February 1, 1801, he spent most of his early life with his mother and foster-father in the Östergötland province. He started his studies in music at a fairly young age, and primarily studied piano and flute. At the age of fifteen, he gained recognition for composing a flute concerto that was performed in the nearby city of Norrköping in 1816. After achieving his first compositional success, Lindblad was sent by his foster-father to work in a shipping office in Hamburg to learn a trade, at the age of seventeen, but he stayed only a year.

A year after his return to Sweden in 1823, Lindblad enrolled in the music school at Uppsala University. While at Uppsala, he studied harmony with J. C. F Haeffener, and he was encouraged by Malla Silfverstolpe, a Swedish writer and salon hostess, to study music in Berlin for a year under Carl Friedrich Zelter. There he met and studied alongside the seventeen-year-old Felix Mendelssohn. The two became friends and would frequently write to each other after Lindblad returned to Sweden in 1827. In 1826, during his time in Berlin, Lindblad published Der Nordensaal, a collection of 12 folksong arrangements.

Returning to Sweden, he became more determined exclusively on music. Apart from opening a piano school, which he ran until 1861, Lindblad was contracted to become the Swedish Royal family's music instructor. He became the music teacher of the Crown Prince, Oscar I and of the King's children, Prince Gustavus and Princess Eugenie.

With his royal position providing a reliable income, Lindblad also could devote himself to composition, especially Swedish song or lieder of which he composed over 200, earning him the nicknames of “the Swedish Schubert” and “the father of Swedish song.” His first publication, a collection of songs composed by him and by his professor Erik Gustaf Geijer, came after Lindblad's first year at Uppsala. His songs are described as genuinely Swedish without resorting to folk tunes already in existence.

The success of his Swedish songs is due in part to the assistance of his star pupil, the renowned soprano, Jenny Lind, also known as “the Swedish Nightingale.” She often assisted in Lindblad's vocal compositions, and would perform them regularly in salons and drawing rooms and as encores.

Lindblad's collaborative relationship with Jenny Lind brought many triumphs. For instance, Lindblad brought Jenny Lind to meet the famous opera composer, Giacomo Meyerbeer, while she was studying voice in Paris, precipitating her rise in popularity in Germany and Britain. Lindblad also introduced Lind to Mendelssohn. The fondness of Lindblad and Lind for each other gradually became romantic; and eventually Lindblad's wife Sophie offered to leave him so that he could marry Lind. He rejected this offer. His romantic relationship with Lind ceased.

Although Lindblad was mostly known for his vast Swedish song repertoire, he also composed larger works. In 1831, he completed his Symphony No. 1 in C major. The first movement of the work would be performed that year at the Riddarhuset in Stockholm. The first full performance of the work occurred on March 25, 1832. However, it did not achieve critical acclaim until after it was performed by the Gewandhaus Orchestra in Leipzig under the direction of Mendelssohn in 1839, a performance that received a positive review by Robert Schumann in the German music journal, Neue Zeitschrift für Musik. Lindblad continued to compose larger works including the Symphony No. 2 in D major, two string quintets, three violin sonatas, seven string quartets, and an opera, Frondörerna (The Rebels).

Lindblad strived to bring legitimacy to Swedish music and succeeded in doing so, even though his music was often criticized by the Swedish press for being too harmonically bold. It was not until Ludwig Spohr of Kassel praised Lindblad that the Swedish critics started to appreciate Lindblad. Towards the end of his life, he abstained from composing large works, and spent much of his time composing for friends and fellow musicians who shared a “contemporary Swedish taste.” He died at the age of 77 in Linköping on August 23, 1878.

== Style and influences ==
Lindblad's studies under Zelter for a year in Berlin may have been his biggest musical influence. Lindblad also appears to have been influenced by composers of Viennese Classicism such as Mozart, Ludwig van Beethoven, and Haydn. Lindblad's style as a result sounds very late Classical to early Romantic, which is particularly apparent in his Symphony No. 1 in C major and Symphony No. 2 in D major.

Many elements of the First Symphony are reminiscent of Beethoven's Eroica and Weber's First Symphony. The resemblance is heard especially in the opening horn fanfare in the first movement. The particular use of the horn in the "Scherzo" is also comparable to Haydn's Hornsignal Symphony. The third movement, “Adagio e molto,” is described as bearing resemblance to late works of Mozart. In the final movement, Lindblad explores various styles, opening with a fugue and abruptly changing to a lyrical melody played by flutes. A motif is also very similar to the “terrace” motif in Beethoven's Ninth.

In Symphony No. 2 in D major, many of the same influences can be found despite its being composed nearly 25 years after his First. Lindblad employs many stylistic qualities found in late Mozart, Haydn, and Beethoven. When listening to the work, one can hear a short use of a motif similar to the four-note motif of Beethoven's Fifth Symphony. The second movement brings a dance-like quality that could have been influenced by Haydn's “walking” themes with a hint of Romanticism. The "Scherzo" can be argued to be evoking Schumann. In the final movement of Symphony No. 2, Lindblad expresses an appreciation for Mozart by quoting Cherubino's aria from Le nozze di Figaro.

Lindblad's style of orchestration has been praised as excellent, despite Lindblad's not being known to have seriously studied proper orchestration technique.

Lindblad's song style can be compared to the lieder styles of Schubert, Schumann, and Brahms in that many of Lindblad's songs are “strophic or built on a pattern of two contrasting stanzas which return more or less varied.” However, Lindblad composed in a way that made the music stand apart from those other lieder traditions. Without resorting to traditional Swedish folk tunes as a basis for his songs, he was able to color them in a way that is described as genuinely Swedish. Lindblad is credited with being the innovator of the “Swedish style” of song. Performing Swedish lieder in a manner that sounds true to the style demands a certain amount of attention to the nuances of the language and the interpretation.

== List of works ==
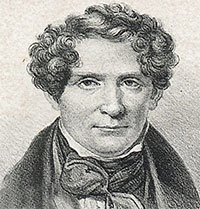
Adolf Fredrik Lindblad. Lithography, 1847

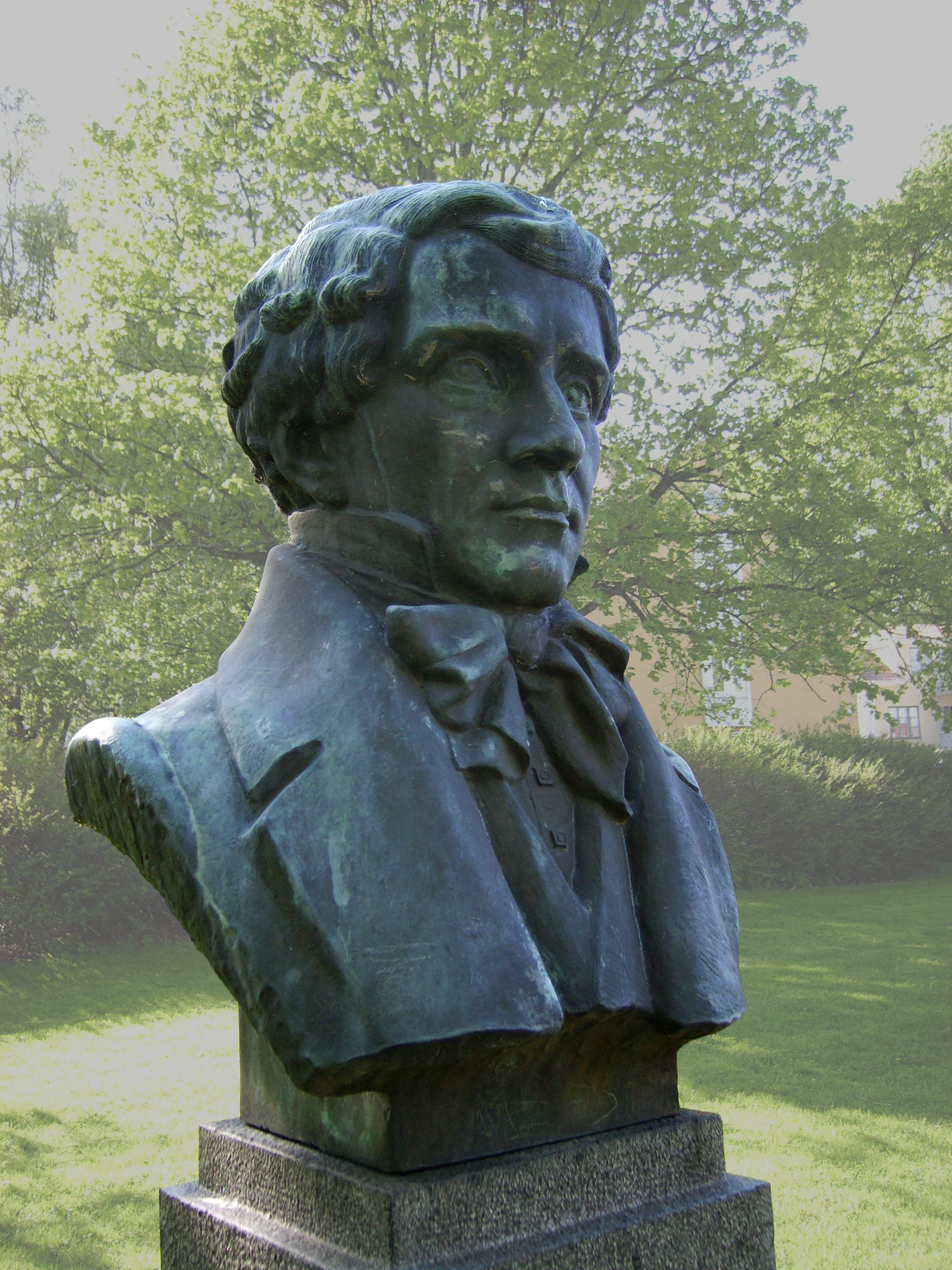
Statue of Adolf Fredrik Lindblad in Skänninge

=== Vocal works ===
==== Solo songs ====
- Erster Verlust (First Loss) (Johann Wolfgang von Goethe), 1824
- Bröllopsfärden (Wedding Trip) (A.F. Lindblad), 1836
- Nära (Nigh) (A.F. Lindblad)
- Jungfrun i lunden (Virgin in the Grove)
- Apelgården (Apple Garden)
- Sorg (Grief)
- På berget (On the mountain)
- I dalen (In the valley)
- Aftonen (Evening) (Erik Johan Stagnelius)
- Mån tro? Jo, jo! (Perhaps? Yes, yes!) (A.F. Lindblad)
- Buch der Lieder (Heinrich Heine), 1860s
  - 1. Sie haben heut' abend Gesellschaft (You have this evening Society)
  - 2. Wie kannst du ruhig schlafen (As you can sleep quietly)
  - 3. So hast du ganz und gar vergessen (So you have quite forgotten)
  - 4. Ja, du bist elend und ich grolle nicht (Yes, you are miserable and I do not complain)
  - 5. Wir haben viel für einander gefühlt (We have felt much for each other)
  - 6. Lieb Liebchen, leg's Händchen aufs Herze (Sweetheart, her little hands on my heart)
  - 7. Morgens steh' ich auf und frage (In the morning I rise and ask)
  - 8. Still ist die Nacht, es ruhen die Gassen (Still is the night, there lie the streets)
  - 9. Der Asra (The Asra)
- En sommarmorgon (One summer morning)
- En sommardag (One summer day)
- En sommarafton (One summer evening)
- Höstkvällen (Autumn Evening), (Johan Ludvig Runeberg), 1847
- Svanvits sång (The Swan Song), (Per Daniel Amadeus Atterbom), 1822
- Nattviolen (Night Violet), (Urban von Feilitzen)
- Nattväktarsång (Night watchdog's song)
- Den skeppsbrutne (The shipwrecked)
- Sotargossen (Chimney-sweep boy), 1836
- Gubben vid vägen (The old man by the road), 1838
- Krigsinvaliden (War invalid)
- Skjutsgossen på hemvägen (Pushed the boy on his way home), 1838
- En dagakarls visa (One man's view of a day), 1844
- Slåttervisa (Cutting display), 1844
- En ung flickas morgonbetraktelse (A young girl's morning reflection)
- Hon skriver (She writes), 1845
- Stryknings-visa (An ironing show), (Thekla Knös), 1856
- Den flitiga handen (The diligent hand), (Thekla Knös), 1856
- Am Aarensee (At Aarensee)
- Der schlummernde Amor (The slumbering love)
- A une femme (A woman)
- Saknad (Missing)
- Illusion (Illusion)
- Nio smärre sånger (Nine minor songs), 1851
  - I höet (In the hay)
  - Bedragen väntan (Betrayed waiting)
- Sånger (Songs), 1844
  - Föresats (Purpose)
  - Hjärtats vaggsång (Lullaby of the heart)
  - Mitt liv (My life) (Johan Ludvig Runeberg)
  - Som mörka bäcken rinner (As dark streams flow) (Per Daniel Amadeus Atterbom)
  - Vårbetraktelser under sjukdom (During illness) (Jacob Frese)
  - Till Sophie (For Sophie)
  - Fåfäng varning (Vain warning)

==== Quartets, trios and duets ====
- Drömmarne (Dream), song cycle for mixed choir and piano (text: AF Lindblad after Thekla Knös), 1851
  - De till dalens hyddor smyga (The valley's huts to sneak)
  - Lärkan i skyn (Lark in the sky)
  - Med en barnbön på sin mun (With a children's prayer in her mouth)
  - Och drömmar nu gå (And dreams now go)
  - Stilla på himlen molnen de segla (Still in the sky the clouds the sail)
  - Till den gamles bädd de gå (To the old man's bed they go)
  - Ännu en dröm (Still a dream)
- Om winterqväll (Winter evening), song cycle for mixed choir and piano (text: AF Lindblad), first performed 1845
  - Väl sommar'n flytt (Well The summer transfer)
  - En vårdag: Giv akt! Nu kommer vår'n (A spring day: Attention!)
  - En vårdag: Fast isen täckt floder och sjöar (A spring day: Solid ice covered rivers and lakes)
  - En vårdag: En fiskare jag ser... (A spring day: A fisherman I see ...)
  - En Sommarmorgon (A summer morning)
  - En sommarafton: Över skogen, över sjön (One summer evening: over the forest, the lake)
  - En sommarafton: Men solen länge re'n (One summer evening: But the sun long)
  - En sommarafton: Det rinner strömmar många (A Summer Evening: The flowing streams many)
  - En sommarafton: Och nu, god natt! (One summer evening: And now, good night!)
  - Herden leder hemåt hjordens... (The shepherd leads the flock back home ...)

=== Instrumental works ===
==== Orchestral ====
- Symphony No. 1 in C major
- Symphony No. 2 in D major

==== Chamber music ====
- Violin Sonata No. 1 in G major, Op. 9
- Violin Sonata No. 2 in D major, Op. 11
- Violin Sonata No. 3 in E flat major
- Trio in G minor for piano, violin and viola, op. 10
- String Quartet No. 1 in G major
- String Quartet No. 2 in B major
- String Quartet No. 3 in C major
- String Quartet No. 4 in B minor
- String Quartet No. 5 in F major
- String Quartet No. 6 in A flat major.
- String Quartet No. 7 in A major (final lost)
- String Quartet No. 8 in F major (only the first movement is preserved)
- String Quartet No. 9 in G major
- String Quartet No. 10 in C major
- String Quintet No. 1 in A major, (performed 1829)
- String Quintet No. 2 in F major (performed 1885)

=== Opera ===
- Frondörerna (The Rebels)
