= Nicolaus Ragvaldi =

Archbishop of Uppsala from 1438 to 1448

Nils Ragvaldsson
- Archbishop of Uppsala; Primate of Sweden
- Church: Roman Catholic
- Archdiocese: Uppsala
- Appointed: 1438
- In office: 1438–1448
- Predecessor: Olaus Laurentii
- Successor: Jöns Bengtsson Oxenstierna
- Previous post: Bishop of Växjö (1426–1438)

Orders
- Rank: Metropolitan Archbishop

Personal details
- Born: 1380s Floda, Södermanland, Sweden
- Died: 17 February 1448

Nicolaus Ragvaldi (Swedish: Nils Ragvaldsson; early 1380s – 17 February 1448) was the bishop of Växjö and the archbishop of Uppsala in Sweden from 1438 to 1448. He is known as an early representative of the Gothicist tradition.

On 12 November 1434 he held a speech at the council of Basel, where he argued that the Swedish monarch, Eric of Pomerania, was a successor to the Gothic kings, and that the Swedish delegation deserved senior rank. The Spanish delegation responded with a claim of seniority because of the Visigoths. Notes of these speeches were written down and preserved, and included by Johannes Magnus when he wrote the influential History of the Nordic People about 150 years later. His research results resulted in Gustav Vasa's son styling himself as Eric XIV, although his father disapproved.

== See also ==
- List of archbishops of Uppsala
