= Geijersgården =

Historic Swedish farm in Uppsala

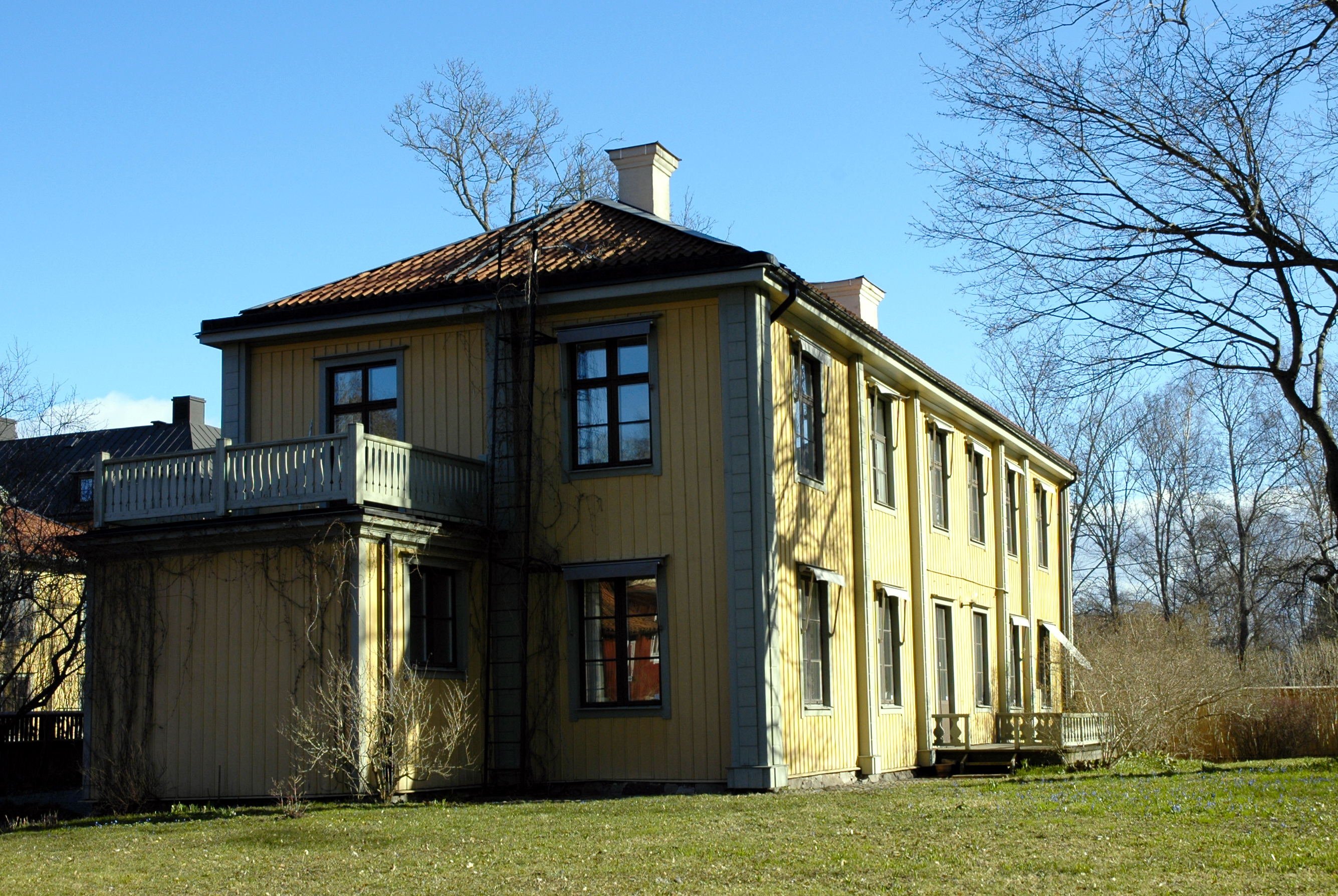
- Geijersgården in April 2007
- Location: Uppsala, Sweden
- Coordinates: 59°51′21″N 17°37′51″E

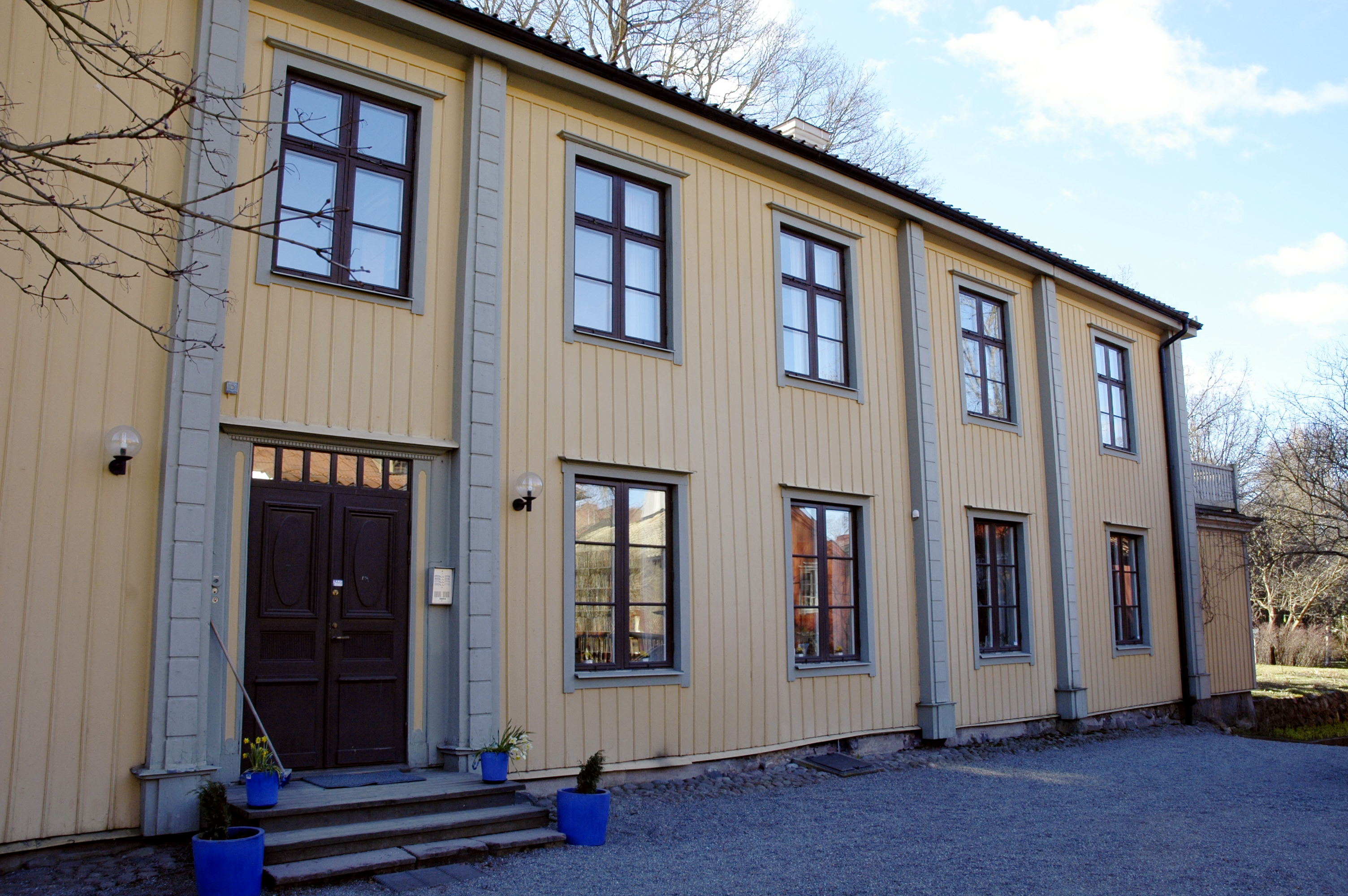
Geijersgården in early April 2007

Geijersgården (The Geijer Farm) is located in Uppsala, Sweden, north of Carolina Rediviva, the main building of Uppsala University Library.

The name of the farm comes from Erik Gustaf Geijer who lived here 1837–1846. The main building was built 1737–38 by governor Johan Brauner, whose son-in-law Johan Ihre lived there from 1739.

In 1837, Uppsala University wanted the farm buildings to be demolished in order to create a park by Carolina Rediviva. Then Geijer sold the southern part of the farm which contained a few small buildings, and had the remaining buildings renovated. The farm has its present appearance since 1850, when it was painted yellow; since 1850 it hasn't been changed.

In 1934 Uppsala University bought the farm.

In 1982 the west part of the main building burnt and the reparations were finished in 1983.
