= Swedish Chronicle =

15th century chronicle on Sweden

The Swedish Chronicle (Vetus chronicon sveciae prosaicum or Prosaiska krönikan) is a mid-15th century chronicle on a nation called Getae (gethe), Goths (gotha), Geats (götha) and eventually Swedes (swenske). It says that it is compiled from ancient chronicles.

It includes a line of kings from the House of Yngling which appears to be based on the Norwegian Historia Norwegiæ and the Danish Chronicon Lethrense, but the compiler seems to have corrected the information.

== Line of kings ==
The first part of its line of Swedish kings:

- Inge (Yngvi, here the son of Filimer)
- Neorch and Froe (Njord and Freyr)
- Urbar (made his son Dan king of Denmark and his son Nore the king of Norway)
- Östen
- Solen (was drowned in a vat of mead like Fjölnir)
- Swerker
- Valand
- Wisbur
- Domalde (was sacrificed to a troll named Ceres)
- Domar
- Attila (made the Danes accept the dog king as their king)
- Dyguer
- Dager
- Alrik (was killed by his brother Erik with a rein)
- Ingemar (was hanged by his wife in Agnafit)
- Ingeller (was killed by his own brother)
- Järunder
- Hakon (killed Harald Wartooth at the Battle of Brávellir and became so old that he had to feed by suckling a horn)
- Eghil
- Oktar (killed by his brother Faste)
- Adhel (died when he fell off his horse during the sacrifices)
- Östen (was arsoned to death)
- Ingemar
- Bräntemundher (was killed by his own brother Sigurd in Närke)
- Ingeller (was so afraid of Ivar the far-travelled that he arsoned himself to death)
- Olaffver trätelge
- Inge (died in battle)
- Erik Weatherhat
- Eric the Victorious
- Stenkil of Good Harvests (the first Christian king)
- Olof Skötkonung

== Sources and external links ==
- The Swedish Chronicle, in the original language (rtf).
- Anderson, Carl Edlund. Formation and Resolution of Ideological Contrast in the Early History of Scandinavia. Ph.D. thesis, University of Cambridge, Department of Anglo-Saxon, Norse & Celtic (Faculty of English)
