= Johannes Magnus =

Swedish Catholic prelate and historian (1488–1544)

The Most Reverend Johannes Magnus
- Archbishop of Uppsala; Primate of Sweden
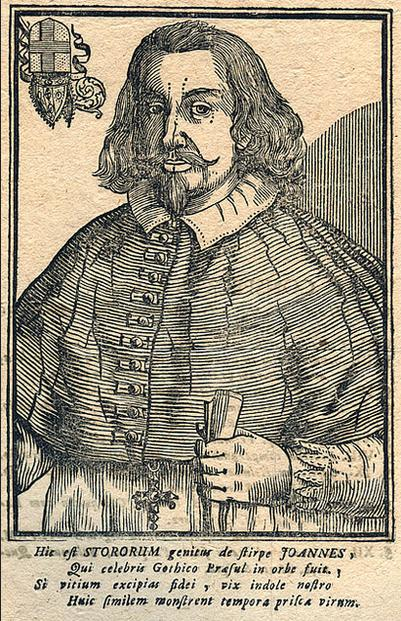
- Church: Catholic Church
- Diocese: Uppsala
- Installed: 1524
- Term ended: 1531
- Predecessor: Gustav Trolle
- Successor: Olaus Magnus

Personal details
- Born: Johan Månsson; 19 March 1488 Linköping, Sweden
- Died: 22 March 1544 (aged 56) Rome, Papal States
- Denomination: Roman Catholic
- Parents: Måns Pedersson (father); Kristina Kruse (mother)
- Occupation: Historian, genealogist

Johannes Magnus (a modified form of Ioannes Magnus, a Latin translation of his birth name Johan Månsson; 19 March 1488 – 22 March 1544) was the last functioning Catholic Archbishop in Sweden, and also a theologian, genealogist, and historian.

== Life ==
Johannes Magnus was born in Linköping, son of the burgess Måns Pedersson and his wife Kristina Kruse. (His own later claims to be descended from a noble family named Store are unverified.) Magnus was selected by Gustav I Vasa to become Archbishop, in 1523. As he was about to travel to Rome to be ordained, a papal bull from Pope Clement VII was received, stating that the previous Archbishop Gustav Trolle, who was at the time in exile abroad, should be reinstated. The papal bull declared the deposition of Trolle unlawful.

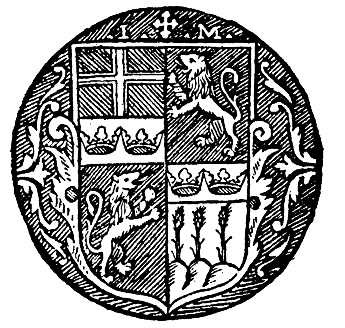
Seal of Johannes Magnus

However, Gustav Vasa refused to reinstate Trolle. Instead he ignored the papal bull and took it upon himself to install Magnus without papal acceptance. Before long, however, Johannes Magnus rebelled by declaring his discontent with the Lutheran teachings spread by the brothers Olaus and Laurentius Petri, under the supervision of King Gustav Vasa. The King then sent him off to Russia as a diplomat in 1526. Johannes Magnus was careful not to return home during that time, realizing that he was unwanted. Gustav Vasa appointed a new archbishop, Laurentius Petri, in 1531, and Johannes realized that his time as archbishop was over.

His brother, Olaus Magnus, had meanwhile travelled to Rome to explain the matter of Gustav Trolle to the Pope. In 1533 the Pope finished investigating the Trolle matter and decided that Magnus was the most appropriate successor, and Magnus travelled to Rome to be ordained. However, as Sweden now no longer took direction from the Vatican, both brothers remained in Italy for the remainder of their lives.

Magnus spent his time in Venice and Rome, where he wrote two historical works about Sweden: Historia de omnibus Gothorum Sueonumque regibus and Historia metropolitanæ ecclesiæ Upsaliensis, which are important for their historical information, but are also filled with tales that have no reliable foundation. After the death of Johannes in 1544, the line of Swedish archbishops consecrated by the Pope ended. He died in Rome.

== Works ==
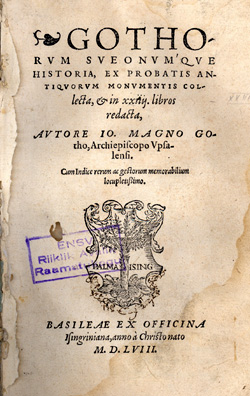
Gothorum Sveonumque Historia (1558)

The Historia de omnibus Gothorum Sueonumque regibus ("History of all Kings of Goths and Swedes") is a work on Swedish history, which was printed posthumously in Rome in 1554 by Johannes' brother Olaus Magnus. Olaus sent it to Sweden with a dedication to the dukes Eric, John, Magnus and Charles, Gustav's sons. It was subsequently republished several times. It appeared in a Swedish translation by Er. Schroderus for the first time in 1620. It is a very unreliable source for early Swedish history.

Johannes Magnus made creative use of Jordanes' Getica and of Saxo Grammaticus to depict a history of the Swedish people, of their kings, and of the "Goths abroad". He states that Magog, son of Japheth, was Sweden's first king. The first 16 volumes are taken up by the period before AD 1000 in a strange mixture of tales from earlier writers and his own fiction, allegedly derived from runic records at Uppsala in the Younger Futhark, which he claimed had served the Goths as an alphabet for some two millennia before Christ. Johannes Magnus invented a list of kings of Sweden with six Erics before Eric the Victorious, where he started counting from Jordanes' Berig as Eric I. He also invented six kings of the name Charles before Charles Sverkersson. This is how Gustav I Vasa's sons could style themselves as Eric (XIV) and Charles (IX). While the work describes these fictional Erics and Charles in generally positive terms, it also includes a few invented tyrants with names similar to Gustav.

The work is exceedingly patriotic and suggests that Denmark was populated by convicts exiled from Sweden, a charge drawing a sharp rebuttal from the Danish court.

A milestone in Swedish and European Gothicism, Johannes’ work proved fundamental in the birth of various declensions of Nordicism, arguing that humankind stemmed from the North and imbuing this cardinal point with powerful political and prophetical meanings.

== See also ==
- Ballad of Eric
- List of archbishops of Uppsala

== Sources ==
- F.F.V. Söderberg (1910), "Johannes Magnus", Nordisk familjebok (in Swedish)
- Herman Hofberg; Frithiof Heurlin; Viktor Millqvist; Olof Rubenson (1906), "Magnus, Johannes", Svenskt biografiskt handlexikon (in Swedish), vol. II, p. 115

Religious titles
| Preceded by Gustav Trolle | Archbishop of Uppsala; 1523–1531 | Succeeded by Olaus Magnus |
