= Carl Säve =

Swedish linguist (1812-1876)

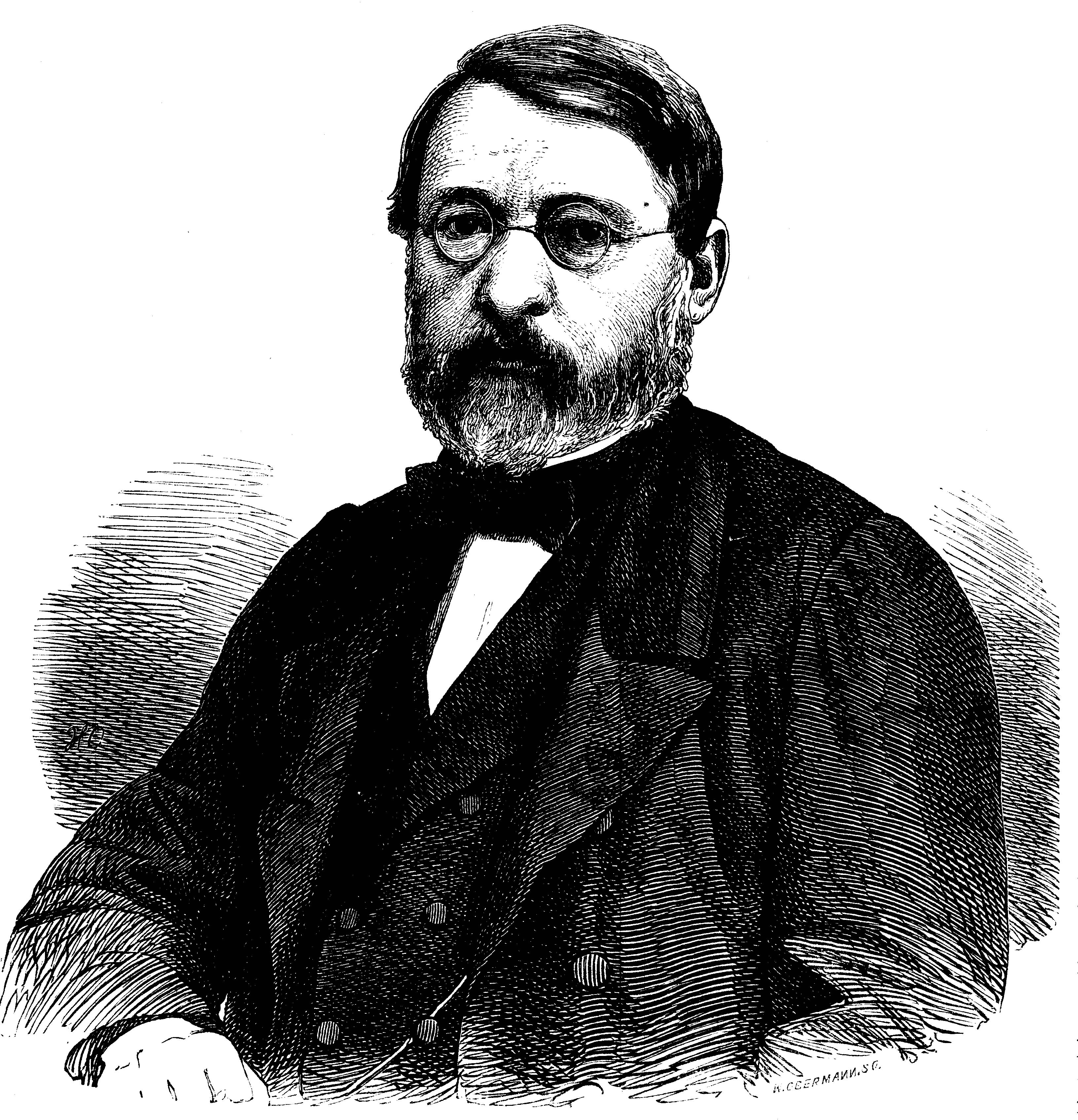

Carl Fredrik Säve (22 October 1812 – 27 March 1876) was a Swedish linguist who studied Dalecarlian, Gutnish, Old Norse and runestones.

He passed through the academic ranks at Uppsala University, eventually becoming a professor in Nordic languages in 1859, a position he held his entire life. He is credited with popularizing dialectology in Sweden.

He was the brother of Pehr Arvid Säve. In 1866, he married Ottilia Rosina Johanna Schenson.
