= Berig =

Legendary king of the Goths

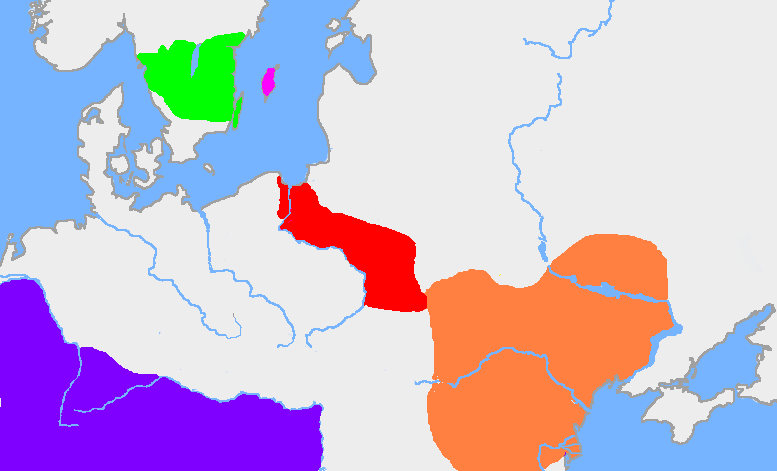
Land of the Geats (Götaland) Gotland (the island) Wielbark culture in the early 3rd century (Vistula Basin) Chernyakhov culture in the early 4th century (ruled by Goths) Roman Empire

Berig is a legendary king of the Goths appearing in the Getica by Jordanes. According to Jordanes, Berig led his people on three ships from Scandza (Scandinavia) to Gothiscandza (the Vistula Basin). They settled and then attacked the Rugians who lived on the shore and drove them away from their homes, subsequently winning a battle against the Vandals.

Arne Søby, a Danish historian, has nonetheless proposed that Cassiodorus, who wrote the original text on which Jordanes's work is based, invented Berig, with inspiration from the name of Βέρικος (Berikos or Verica). Some archaeological research indicates, however, that the transition of the Oksywie culture into the Wielbark culture was peaceful and its timing coincides with the appearance of a new population of Scandinavian origins in the previously uninhabited area ("no man's land") between the Oksywie and Przeworsk culture areas.

The 16th-century Swedish archbishop of Uppsala Johannes Magnus, in his history of the Swedes and Goths, was the first to publish a song known as the "Ballad of Eric", about an early Gothic king called Eric, who bears some similarities to Berig. It was once thought to contain authentic folk tradition about the king, but it is now regarded as inaccurate. However, Magnus discusses King Berig separately as having united the Swedes and Goths some 400 years after Eric's death.

== In popular culture ==
In popular culture, Berig is referenced (as Berik) in the song "Three Ships of Berik, Pts. 1 and 2" by Swedish symphonic metal band Therion.
