= Eric Weatherhat =

Legendary king of Sweden

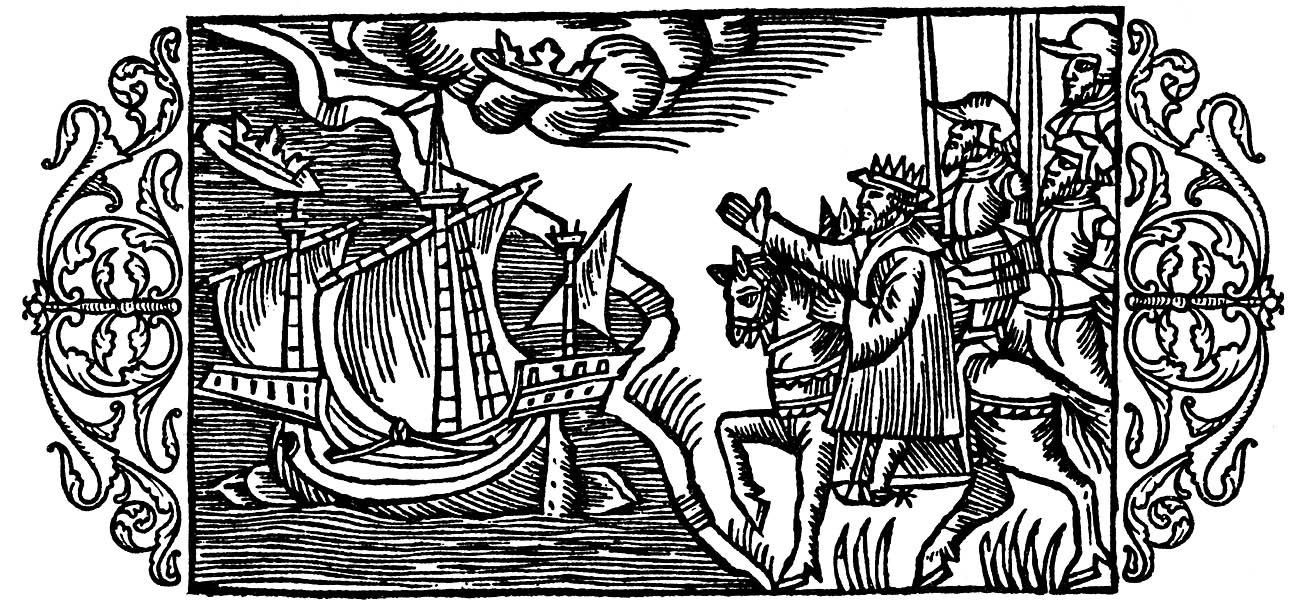
Eric Weatherhat leading the army to the right. He controls the winds so that the ship turns in his direction.

Eric Weatherhat (Swedish: Erik Väderhatt) was a legendary king of Sweden.

According to the Swedish Chronicle, the cognomen Weatherhat refers to the accommodating wind he enjoyed whilst pillaging in the Baltic Sea region.

His place in the Swedish line of kings is mysterious, and so he is either considered to be the same as Eric Anundsson or, according to Gesta Danorum, one of Ragnar Lodbrok's sons.

== See also ==
- Saxo's kings of Sweden
