= Sea Swine =

Mythological fish

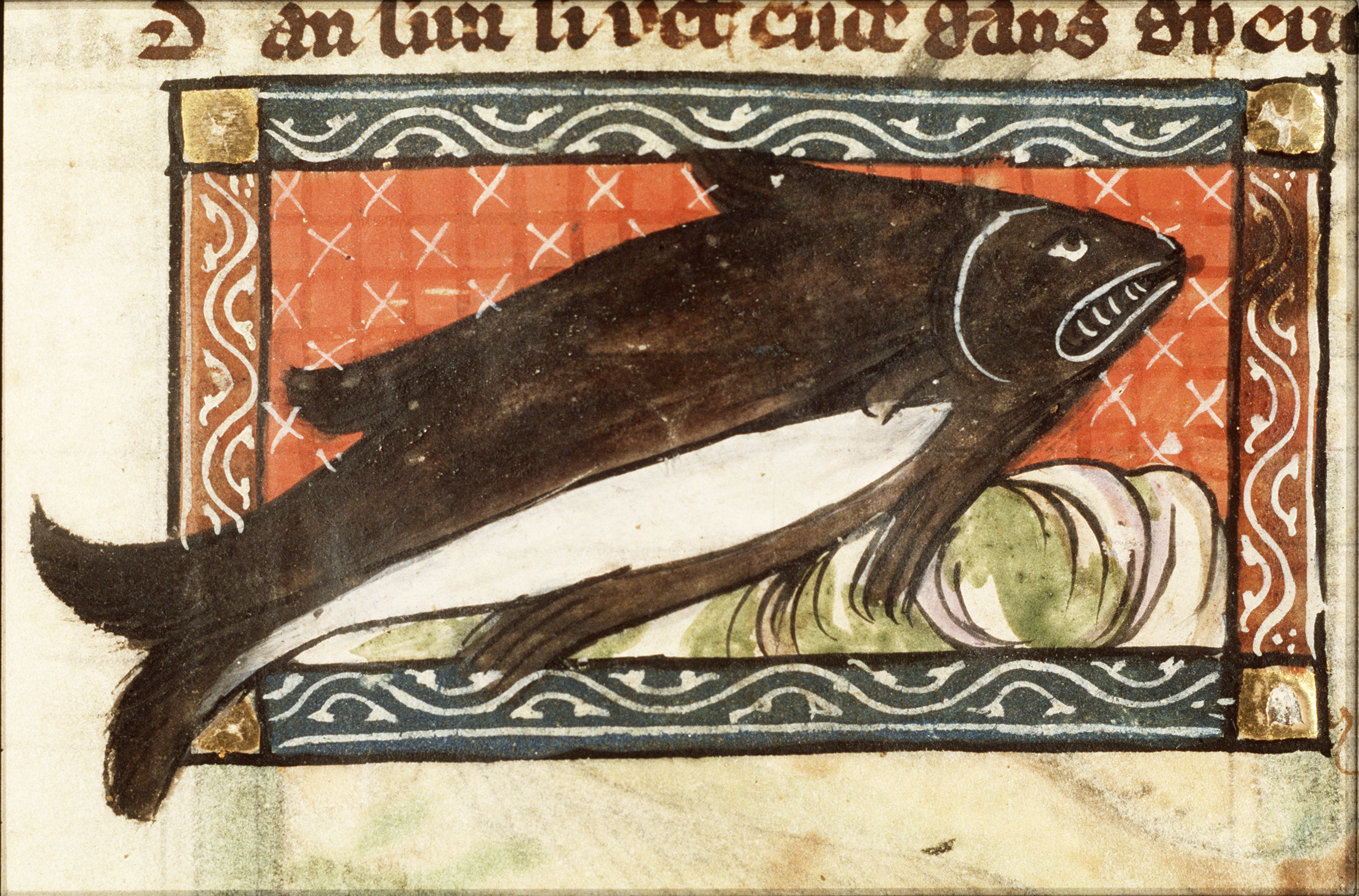
- Porcus marinus (sea-hog) - miniature by Jacob van Maerlant

Creature information
- Other name: Porcus Marinus
- Similar entities: Pigs; Porpoise
- Folklore: Myth

The Sea Swine (a.k.a. Porcus Marinus) was the name given to a variety of sea-dwelling or mythological creatures throughout history. The earliest mention of a 'sea swine' can be traced to ancient Greece. In this context, the name has been interpreted to mean 'porpoise', as a porpoise and pig have similar round body shapes. However, this is disputed by some classical scholars who believe that the 'porcus' section of the name referred instead to grunts emitted from fish in question, not any physical similarities to the pig.

The creatures appeared in the Carta marina, and were depicted in accompanying wood carvings, as fantastical beasts with four dragon's feet and a single eye at the navel. The map placed the creatures as living in the waters south of Iceland.

Additional accounts from the 16th and 17th century delineated the sea swine from more mundane sea creatures. The animals were described as "headed like a Hog, toothed, and tusked like a Boar". The Sea Hogs were reported as travelling in packs with hundreds of individuals. However, contemporary naturalist John Ray was explicit in stating that the sea swine and porpoise were one and the same.
