= Ericus Schroderus =

Finnish philologist and historian

Ericus Johannis Schroderus (c. 1608 – 1639, Upsaliensis) was a Swedish philologist and historian, living in Uppsala.

He compiled the first dictionary which included Finnish as an entry language. Lexicon Latino-Sondicum ("Latin-Scandinavian Dictionary") was published in 1637. Its other entries are in Latin, Swedish and German.

He was a brother of Johan Skytte.
