= Olaus Magnus =

Swedish writer, cartographer, and prelate (1490–1557)

The Most Reverend Olaus Magnus
- Archbishop of Uppsala; Primate of Sweden
- Church: Roman Catholic
- Archdiocese: Uppsala
- Appointed: 4 June 1544
- Term ended: 1 August 1557
- Predecessor: Johannes Magnus
- Successor: Laurentius Petri

Personal details
- Born: Olof Månsson; October 1490 Skänninge, Sweden
- Died: 1 August 1557 (aged 66) Rome, Papal States
- Buried: Santa Maria dell'Anima, Rome

Olaus Magnus (born Olof Månsson; October 1490 – 1 August 1557) was a Swedish writer, cartographer, and Catholic clergyman.

== Biography ==
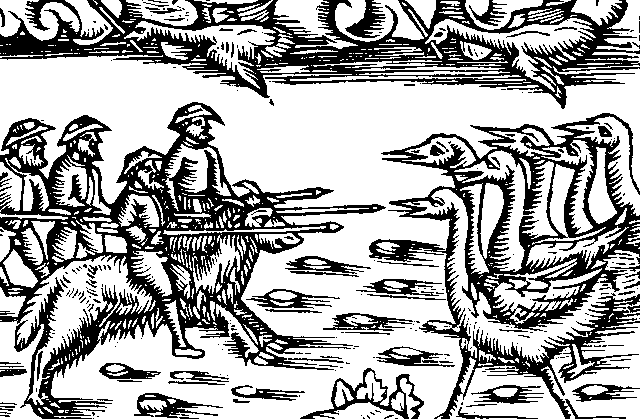
Dwarfs fighting cranes in Greenland

Olaus Magnus (a Latin translation of his Swedish birth name Olof Månsson) was born in Linköping in October 1490. Like his elder brother, Sweden's last Catholic archbishop Johannes Magnus, he obtained several ecclesiastical preferments, among them a canonry at Uppsala and Linköping, and the archdeaconry of Strängnäs. He was furthermore employed on various diplomatic services after his mission to Rome in 1524, on behalf of Gustav I of Sweden (Vasa), to procure the appointment of Olaus Magnus' brother Johannes Magnus as archbishop of Uppsala. He remained abroad dealing with foreign affairs and is known to have sent home a document that contained trade agreements with the Netherlands. With the success of the Reformation in Sweden, his attachment to the Catholic church led him to stay abroad in Poland for good, along with his brother. They were both exiled and Magnus' Swedish belongings were confiscated in 1530.

Settling in Rome in 1537, he acted as his brother's secretary. At the death of his brother Johannes in 1544, Pope Paul III issued him as Johannes's successor as Archbishop of Uppsala; admittedly nothing more than a title, as Sweden was not Catholic anymore and Olaus was banished. In 1545, Pope Paul III sent him to the Council of Trent where he attended meetings until 1549. Later, he became canon of St. Lambert's Cathedral in Liège. King Sigismund I of Poland offered him a canonry at Poznań and he spent the remainder of his life with the monastery of St. Brigitta in Rome, where he subsisted on a pension assigned him by the Pope. He died on 1 August 1557 at the age of about 67.

== Name ==
His original Swedish name was Olof Månsson (his last name meaning "son of Måns"; Magnus is a Latinized version of his patronymic second name, and not the literal personal epithet meaning "great").

== Works ==
He is best remembered as the author of the famous Historia de Gentibus Septentrionalibus (A Description of the Northern Peoples), printed in Rome in 1555, a patriotic work of folklore and history which long remained for the rest of Europe the authority on Swedish matters. This text on dark winters, violent currents and beasts of the sea amazed the rest of Europe. It was translated into Italian (1565), German (1567), English (1658) and Dutch (1665), and not until 1909 into Swedish. Abridgments of the work appeared also at Antwerp (1558 and 1562), Paris (1561), Amsterdam (1586), Frankfort (1618) and Leiden (1652). It is still today a valuable repertory of much curious information in regard to Scandinavian customs and folklore. A translation of the Latin title page goes: "Olaus Magnus Gothus', the Uppsala Archbishop's, history of the Nordic people's different manners and camps, also about the wonderful differences in customs, holy practices, superstitions, bodily exercises, government and food keeping; further on war, buildings and wonderful aids; further on metals and different kinds of animals, that live in these neighbourhoods (...)".

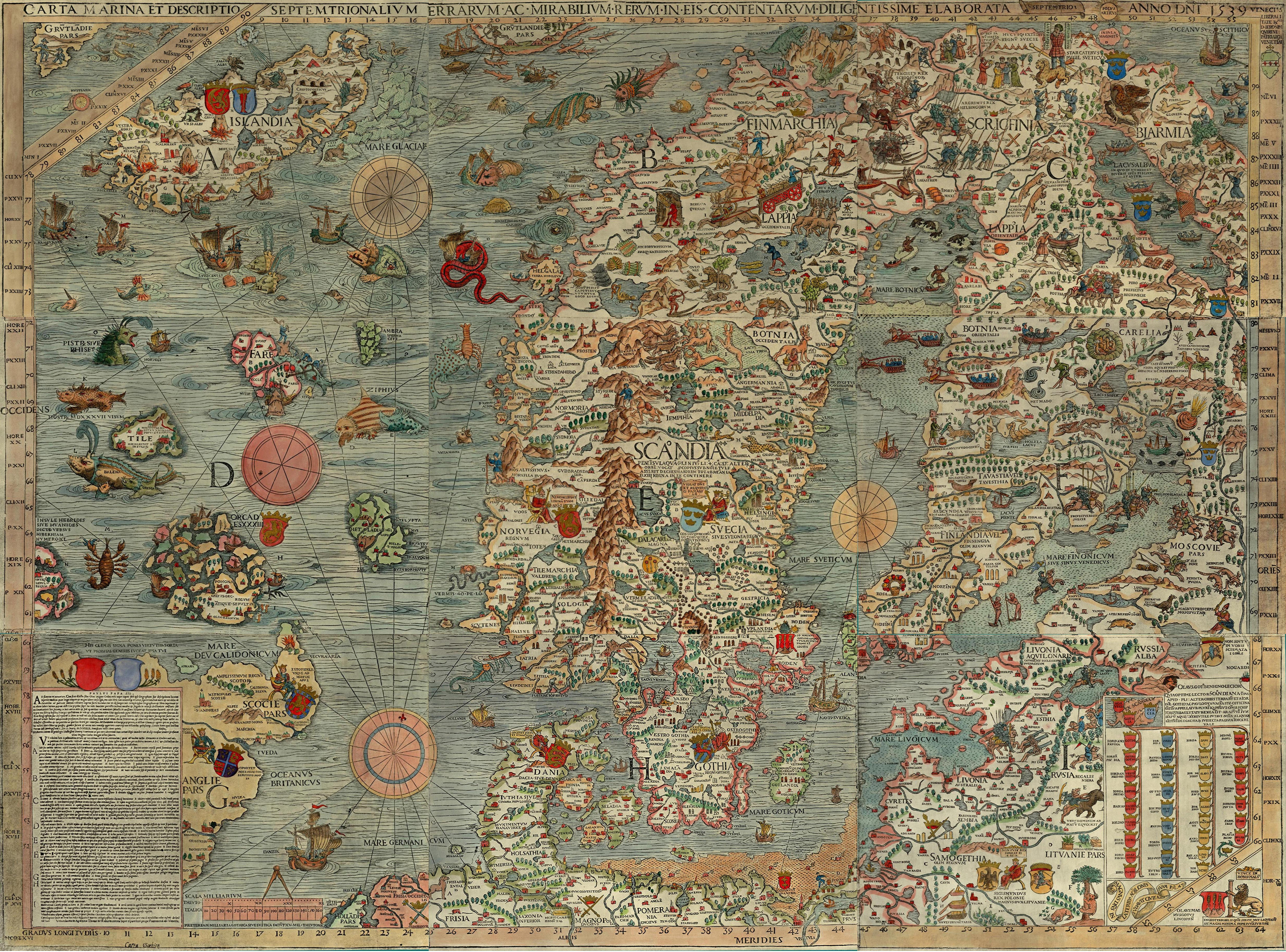
Carta marina

Olaus had already earlier written Carta marina et Descriptio septemtrionalium terrarum ac mirabilium rerum in eis contentarum, diligentissime elaborata Anno Domini 1539 Veneciis liberalitate Reverendissimi Domini Ieronimi Quirini, which translates as "A Marine map and Description of the Northern Lands and of their Marvels, most carefully drawn up at Venice in the year 1539 through the generous assistance of the Most Honourable Lord and Patriarch Hieronymo Quirino". The Italian title translates to "A little book, that more closely explains a map of the Nordic cold, beyond the Germanic sea located country, which presents its extremely peculiar, previously known neither to Greeks or Latins, wonders of nature." It included a map of Northern Europe with a map of Scandinavia, which was rediscovered by Oscar Brenner in 1886 in the München state library and shown to be the most accurate depiction of its time. The map is referred to as "carta marina", and consists of 9 parts, and is remarkably large: 125 cm tall and 170 cm wide.

Following the death of his brother, he also saw to the publication of historical works that his brother had written.

Present day oceanographers rediscovered Olaus Magnus' eye for detail (disregarding elements like the sea monsters) and a series of scientific publications followed on Olaus' truthful depiction of currents between Iceland and the Faroe Islands.

== See also ==
- List of archbishops of Uppsala
