= A Description of the Northern Peoples =

Renaissance era book

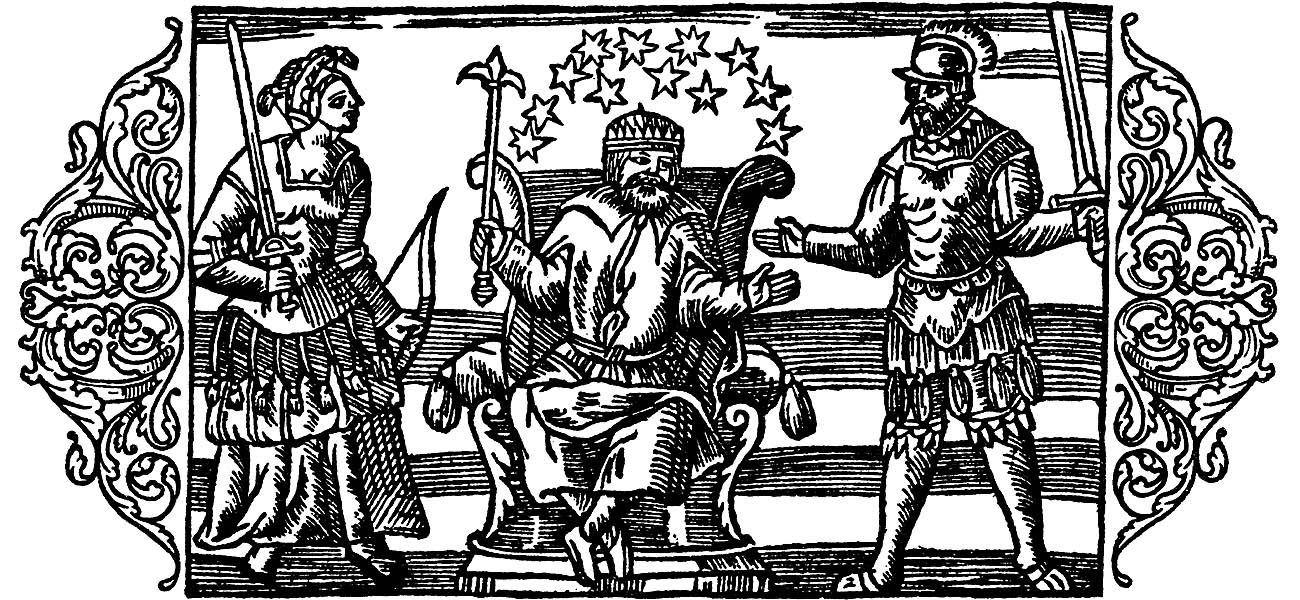
"On the three Main Gods of the Geats." From left to right; Frigg, Thor and Odin.

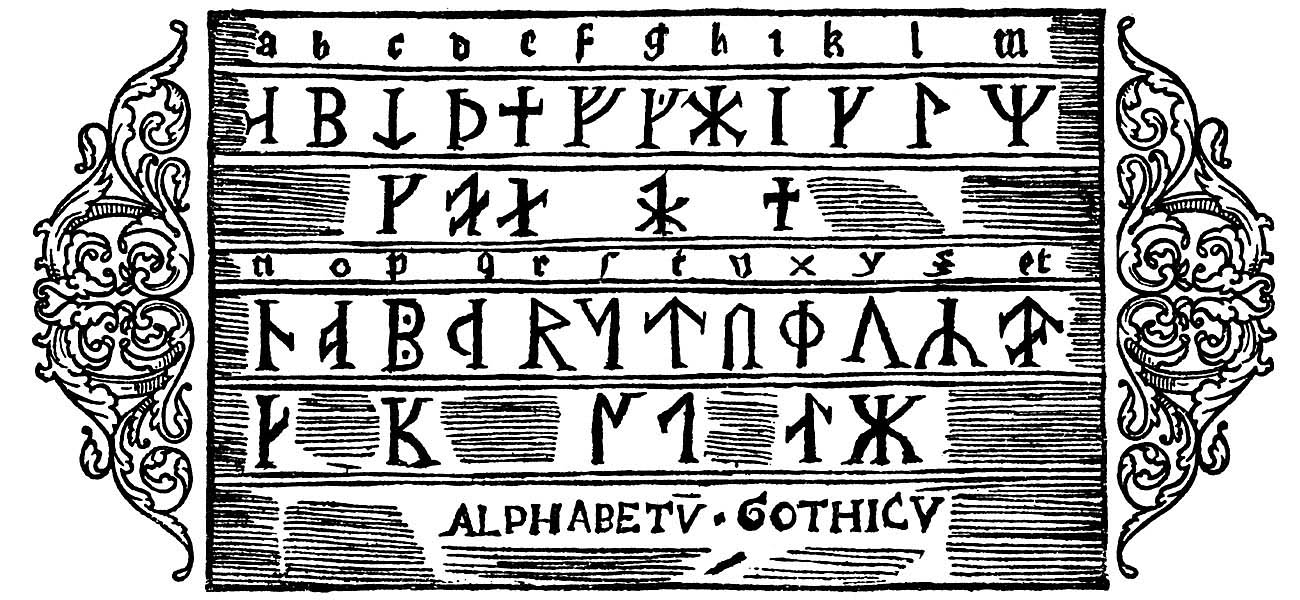
"The Alphabet of the Geats", showing the runic alphabet used by the Geats.

Historia de Gentibus Septentrionalibus is a work by Olaus Magnus on the Nordic countries, printed in Rome in 1555. It long remained for the rest of Europe the authority on Swedish matters. Its popularity was increased by the numerous woodcuts of people and their customs. It is still today a valuable repertory of much historical information in regard to Scandinavian customs and folklore.

It was translated into Dutch (1562), Italian (1565), German (1567), English (1658) and Swedish (1909). Abridgments appeared also at Antwerp (1558 and 1562), Paris (1561), Basel (1567), Amsterdam (1586), Frankfurt (1618) and Leiden (1652).

An exemplar was given to William Cecil during the Swedish king's wooing of queen Elizabeth I of England, and in 1822 it would be referred to by Sir Walter Scott.
