= Erik Gustaf Geijer =

Swedish writer, historian, poet, philosopher, and composer

- Portrait by Carl Wilhelm Nordgren
- Born: 12 January 1783; Ransäter, Värmland
- Died: 23 April 1847 (aged 64); Stockholm

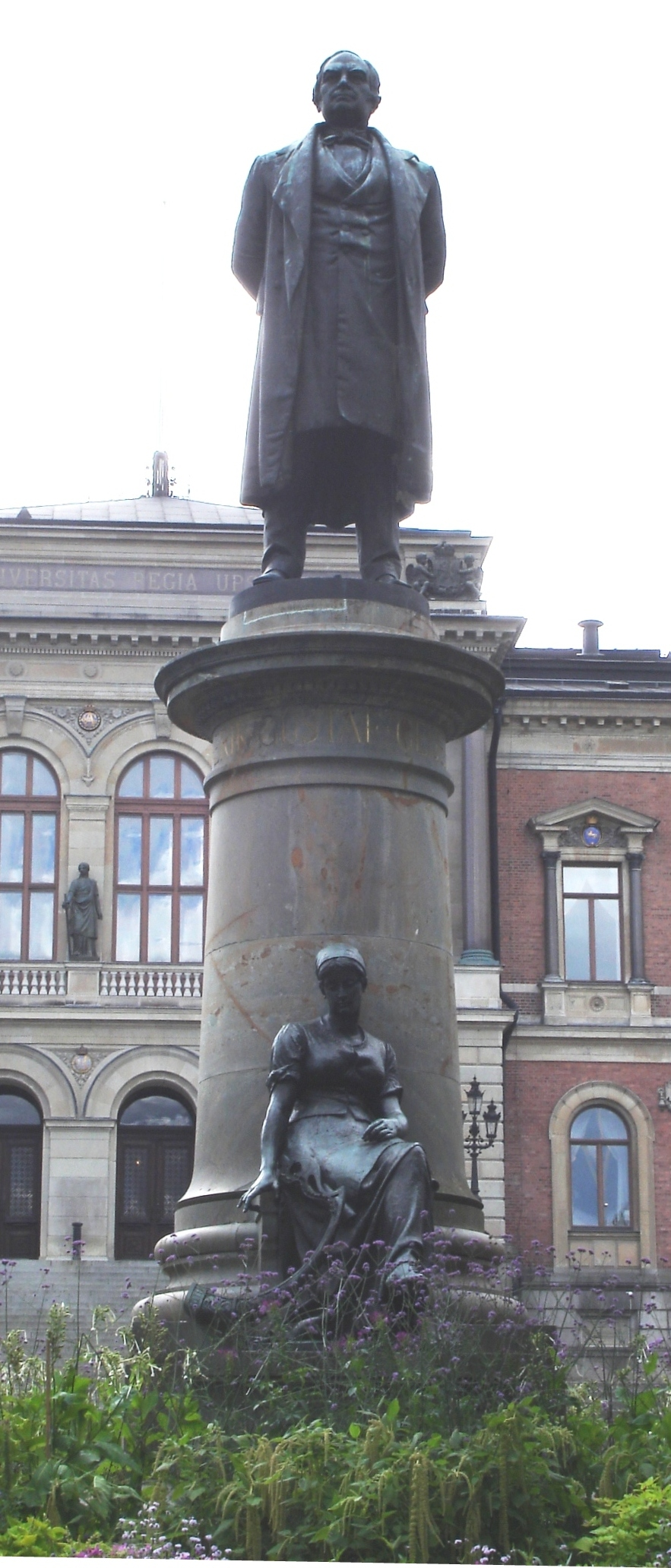
Statue of Geijer at Universitetsparken in Uppsala

Erik Gustaf Geijer (12 January 1783 – 23 April 1847) was a Swedish writer, historian, poet, romantic critic of political economy, philosopher, and composer. His writings served to promote Swedish National Romanticism. He was an influential advocate of conservatism, but switched to liberalism later in life.

== Biography ==
Geijer was born at Geijersgården, his family's estate in Ransäter, Värmland. He was educated at the gymnasium of Karlstad and then attended the University of Uppsala, where he earned his master's degree in 1806. In 1803 he had competed successfully for an historical prize offered by the Academy of Sciences at Stockholm. In 1809, he traveled in England. The year following, he became a lecturer in history at Uppsala, and in 1815 assistant to Eric Michael Fant. Succeeding Fant, Geijer was a professor of history from 1817 at Uppsala University where a statue now commemorates him. He was rector of Uppsala University during the years 1822, 1830, 1836 and 1843–1844. As a representative of the university, he was a member of the Church of Sweden clergy in the Riksdag of the Estates in 1828–1830 and 1840–1841. He was a member of the Swedish Academy (on seat 14) from 1824. He was a member of the education committee from 1825 to 1828. In 1830 he joined Pro Fide et Christianismo, a Christian education society. In 1835, he became a member of the Royal Swedish Academy of Sciences.

Geijer was also a founding member of the Geatish Society (Swedish: Götiska förbundet). In the first issue of its periodical, Iduna, appeared Geijer's most famous poem The Viking, which described the Vikings as the heroic Norsemen that people might imagine today, and was a turning-point in the rehabilitation of Norse culture among the Swedish people. Geijer collaborated with Arvid August Afzelius, in the three volume collection of Swedish folk-songs, Svenska folk-visor från forntiden (Stockholm, 1814–1816).

Geijer was a noted historian, although he did not complete any one of the vast undertakings which he planned. Of the Records of Sweden (Swedish: Svea Rikes häfder), which were to have embraced the history of his native country from mythical ages to his own times, he finished only the introductory volume. His Svenska folkets historia (3 vols., 1832–36), which was intended to form one of the series of European histories edited by Leo and Ukert, was not carried beyond the abdication of Queen Christina (1654), the reason probably being the author's conversion to liberalism in history and politics. It has been suggested, however, that Geijer's declaring for liberalism was perhaps as much coming-out-of-the-closet as it was a true conversion. Incomplete as they are, these works are highly regarded contributions to Swedish history. His History of the Swedes down to Charles X was translated into English by Turner, with biographical introduction (London, 1845).

Geijer was entrusted the task of examining and editing the papers which Gustavus III had bequeathed to the University of Uppsala, with the stipulation that they were not to be opened for fifty years after his death. In fulfillment of his charge, Geijer arranged these papers in a work which appeared in 1843–45 under the title of Gusstaf III's efterlemnade papper, but they contained little or nothing of value.

Although he rose to fame as a nationalist author, Geijer's views changed during his lifetime. During the last ten years of his life, he took an active part in politics, and began to advocate social reform and Liberalism. Although his political writings possess great merit, the very versatility of his powers diverted him from applying them methodically to the complete elaboration of any one subject.

In 1846 increasing ill health forced him to resign his position as professor at Uppsala. He died in Stockholm. He left some personal memoirs, Minnen (Upsala, 1834). His collected works, Samlade Skrifter, with a bibliographic treatise by Teodblad (8 vols.), appeared at Stockholm (1873–75).

== Geijersgården ==
Geijersgården is a historic mansion in the centre of Uppsala, north of the University library. Geijersgården is named after Erik Gustaf Geijer, who lived there from 1837 to 1846. The main building was built between 1737 and 1738. The estate gained its present appearance around 1850.

In 1934, the estate was taken over by Uppsala University and since 1965 has housed the Dag Hammarskjöld Foundation (Hammarskjöldfonden). The building was restored in the 1983 after a fire in which the building's western parts were badly damaged. The buildings are classified as historic properties under the Swedish Cultural Monuments Act (Kulturminneslagen).

== Ancestors ==
Erik Gustaf Geijer was the grandfather of Hugo E. G. Hamilton, who was the grandfather of the prominent Swedish cultural person and author Olof Lagercrantz and the great-grandfather of the author and journalist David Lagercrantz and his sister, actress Marika Lagercrantz. Geijer's granddaughter, Hugo Hamilton's sister Eva, was the mother of the Swedish author Agnes von Krusenstjerna.

== Selected works ==
- Om falsk och sann upplysning med avseende på religionen (1811)
- Thorild: Tillika en filosofisk eller ofilosofisk bekännelse (1820)
- Svea rikes häfder (1825)
- Svenska folkets historia, I-III, 1832–36
- Minnen (1834)
- Freedom in Sweden: Selected works of Erik Gustaf Geijer (2017)

== Musical works ==
=== Chamber music ===
- Violin Sonata in G minor, 1819
- Violin Sonata in D minor
- Violin Sonata in F
- Violin Sonata in A♭
- Sonatine for cello and piano, 1838?
- Piano trio in A♭
- Piano Quartet in E minor, 1825, published 1865
- Piano Quintet in F minor, 1823
- String Quartet in F, 1830s
- String Quartet in B, 1846–47

=== Piano ===
- Piano sonata in G minor, 1810
- Fantasi in F minor, 1810
- Divertimento, 1824
- Midnattsfantasi, 1833
- Scherzo, 1838
- Aftonstunder for piano, 1840
- Double sonata E♭ for four-hands, one piano, 1819
- Double sonata F minor for four-hands, one piano, published 1820.

=== Songs ===
(to his own words unless otherwise stated)

- Sångstycken med ackompagnement för Piano-forte (1834)
  - Söderländskan i Norden; I en ung flickas album; Blomplockerskan; Bilden; Tonerna; De små (duet); Höstvisa (duet); Soldatflickorna (duet)
- Nya sånger med ackompanjement för piano-forte (1836)
  - Vårsång (trio); Den första sommarfläkten (trio); I dansen (duett); På sjön (a cappella choir); Avsked med eko (a cappella choir); Aftonkänsla (a cappella choir); Skärsliparegossen; Reseda; Ur dansen
- Nyare sånger till forte-piano (1837)
  - Barndomsminnen; Min hustrus visa; Gräl och allt väl; Min music; Vallflickans aftonvisa; Första aftonen i det nya hemmet ("Jag vet en hälsning mera kär"); Husarbrudarna (duet); Marsch ("För Gud och sanning") (men's chorus)
- Gammalt och nytt. Sånger för forte-piano. (1838)
  - Spinnerskorna (duet); På nyårsdagen; Den lilla kolargossen (The Little Charcoal-burner); Riddar Toggenborg; Anderöst (Per Daniel Amadeus Atterbom); From Lidner's Medea (I) and (II) (Bengt Lidner); Den slumrande lilla flickan (Carl Wilhelm Böttiger)
- Sånger till forte-piano. 5:e häftet. (1839)
  - Vår och saknad (duet); Kom! Farväl! (duet); Anna (duet); Den femtiosjätte födelsedagen; Kommer ej våren; Salongen och skogen; Sångerskan; Flicktankar; Gondolieren
- Sånger till forte-piano. 6:e häftet. (1840)
  - Aftonklockan; Natthimmelen (The Night Sky); Höstsädet; Min politik (My politics); Tal och tystnad (Speech and Silence, 1838); På vattnet; Studentsång ("Fädernesland, vars härliga minnen") (men's chorus); Aftonbetraktelse (mixed choir) (Carl Wilhelm Böttiger)
- Sånger till forte-piano. 7:e häftet. (1841)
  - Flickorna (duet); På dagen av mitt silverbröllop (duet); Afton på sjön (duet); På en väns födelsedag (duet); På en resa i hembygden; Vallgossens visa; Juldagen 1840; Vad jag älskar; Stjärnglansen
- Sånger till forte-piano. 8:e häftet. (1842)
  - Det fordna hemmet; Mod och försakelse (1839, for Jenny Lind); Till min dotter; Sparvens visa; Vid en väns tillfrisknande; Den sörjandes morgon; Avskedet; Han; Det sextionde året (duet); Aftonen (trio); Solens nedgång i havet (mixed choir)
- Sånger till forte-piano. 9:e häftet. (1846)
  - Den enfaldiga visan; Arbetarens visa; Skridskovisa; Den nalkande stormen; Två sånger utan ord (piano)

=== Other vocal works ===
- Musik för sång och för fortepiano (with Adolf Fredrik Lindblad (1824)
  - Thekla. Eine Geisterstimme. (Friedrich von Schiller)
  - Till en liten flicka med en guldkjed
  - Svanhvits sång (Per Daniel Amadeus Atterbom)
  - Nya märkvärdigheter (after Friedrich von Schiller) (men's choir)
  - Nähe des Geliebten (Johann Wolfgang von Goethe)
- Aftonstunder vid piano-forte tillegnade min dotter (1840)
  - Tillegnan
- Bragurmannen (songs by Geijer, Adolf Fredrik Lindblad and Johan Erik Nordblom) (1845)
  - Tålamod
  - Harmoniens makt (duet)
- Other songs
  - Vikingen (The Viking, 1811); Odalbonden; Den siste skalden; Aftonbön på Ransberg; Majbetraktelser; Emma (Johan Olof Wallin); Förgät mig ej (possibly Geijer's last song, 1846, published in Nordstjernan, 1847); Skaldens farväl; Mignon
- Other duets
  - Berg och dal; Slädfarten; Vid en väns tillfrisknande (duet version); Kärleken på resan genom lifvet
- Other trios
  - Mor och dotter; Natt-tankar (1841); Afskedssång (1846); Schneiderschreck (Johann Wolfgang von Goethe)

=== Other works for mixed choir ===
- Minne och hopp
- Var lyckan bor
- 1841
- Varning, hopp och bön
- Serenad (Serenata)

=== Other works for men's choir ===
- Svanhvits sång
- Studentmarsch ("Att älska Gud, kung, Fädernesland")
- Till mina vänner
- Vandrar du än

== Other sources ==
Brief biographical treatises were written by Malmstroem (Upsala, 1848), Fries (Stockholm, 1849), and Carlson (Stockholm, 1870).

- Andræ, Carl Goran (1983) Siare och nationalmonument: Historikern Erik Gustaf Geijer, 1783-1847 (Almqvist & Wiksell) ISBN 978-91-554-1429-0
- Ehnmark, Anders (1999) Minnets hemlighet: En bok om Erik Gustaf Geijer (Norstedts) ISBN 978-91-1-300725-0
- Erdmann, Nils Axel Fredrik (2010) Erik Gustaf Geijer: En Minnesteckning (Nabu Press) ISBN 978-1-141-42692-8
- Lönnroth, Lars (2019) Geijerarvet. En släkthistoria om dikt och galenskap (Atlantis)
- Olsson, Bernt and Ingemar Algulin (1991) Litteraturens historia i Sverige (Stockholm) ISBN 91-1-913722-2
- Thorsoe, Alexander (2010) Erik Gustaf Geijers Forelaesninger Over Menniskans Historia (Kessinger Publishing) ISBN 978-1-160-48593-7

Cultural offices
Preceded by Malte Ramel	Swedish Academy, Seat No.14; 1824–1847	Succeeded by Elias Fries
