= Per Daniel Amadeus Atterbom =

Swedish poet

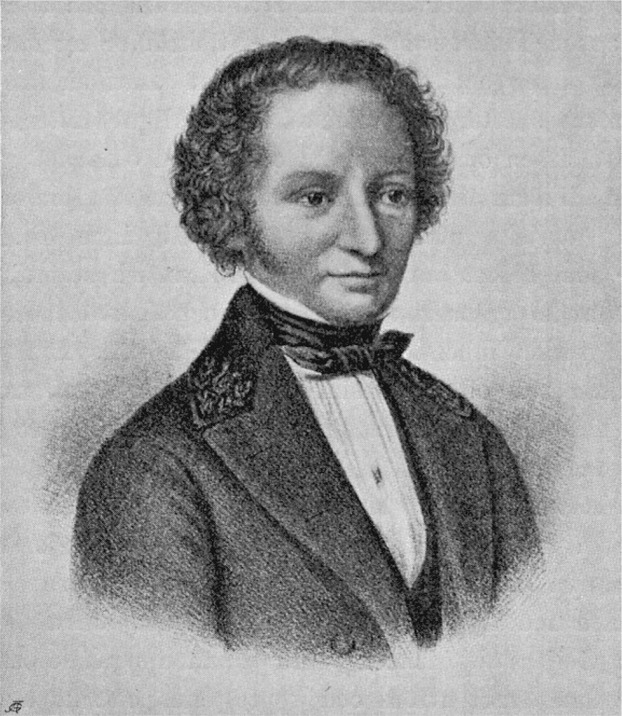
- Born: 19 January 1790; Pålsbo, Åsbo
- Died: 21 July 1855 (aged 65); Stockholm, Sweden
- Education: University of Uppsala
- Occupation: Professor
- Writing career
- Language: Swedish
- Genre: Poetry

Per Daniel Amadeus Atterbom (19 January 1790 in Åsbo, Östergötland – 21 July 1855) was a Swedish romantic poet, and a member of the Swedish Academy.

== Life ==
He was the son of a country parson, born in the province of Östergötland on 19 January 1790. He studied in the university of Uppsala from 1805 to 1815, and became professor of philosophy there in 1828.

He was the first great poet of the romantic movement which, inaugurated by the critical work of Lorenzo Hammarsköld, was to revolutionize Swedish literature. In 1807, when in his seventeenth year, he founded at Uppsala an artistic society, called the Aurora League, the members of which included Vilhelm Fredrik Palmblad, Anders Abraham Grafström, Samuel Hedborn (died 1849), and other youths whose names were destined to take a foremost rank in the literature of their generation.

Their first newspaper, Polyfem, was a crude effort, soon abandoned. Still, in 1810 there began to appear a journal, Fosforos, edited by Atterbom, which lasted for three years and finds a place in classic Swedish literature. It consisted entirely of poetry and aesthetic-polemical essays; it introduced the study of the newly arisen Romantic school of Germany, and formed a vehicle for the early works, not of Atterbom only, but of Hammerskijld, Dahlgren, Palmblad and others. Later, the members of the Aurora League established the Poetisk Kalender (1812-1822), in which their poems appeared, and a new critical organ, Svensk Litteraturtidning (181 5–1824).

Among Atterbom's independent works the most celebrated is Lycksalighetens Ö (The Fortunate Island), a romantic drama of extraordinary beauty, published in 1823. Before this he had published a cycle of lyrics, Blommorna (The Flowers), of a mystical character, somewhat in the manner of Novalis. Of a dramatized fairy tale, Fågel Blå (The Blue Bird), only a fragment, which is among the most exquisite of his writings, is preserved. As a purely lyrical poet he has not been excelled in Sweden, but his more ambitious works are injured by his weakness for allegory and symbolism, and his consistent adoption of the mannerisms of Tieck and Novalis.

In his later years he became less violent in literary controversy. He became in 1835, professor of aesthetics and literature at Uppsala, and four years later he was admitted to the Swedish Academy. He died on 21 July 1855. His Svenska Siare och Skalder (6 vols., 1841–1855, supplement, 1864) consists of a series of biographies of Swedish poets and men of letters, which forms a valuable history of Swedish letters down to the end of the “classical” period. Atterbom's works were collected (13 vols., Örebro) in 1854–1870.

== Poetry ==
- Blommorna (The Flowers)
- Fågel Blå (Blue Bird) 1813
- Lycksalighetens Ö (The Island of Bliss) 1824-27

== Notes ==
Cultural offices
Preceded by Pehr Henrik Ling	Swedish Academy, Seat No 18; 1839-1855	Succeeded by Johan Henrik Thomander
