= List of Uppsala University people =

This is a list of notable people affiliated with Uppsala University.

For a list of chancellors of the university, see Chancellor of Uppsala University.

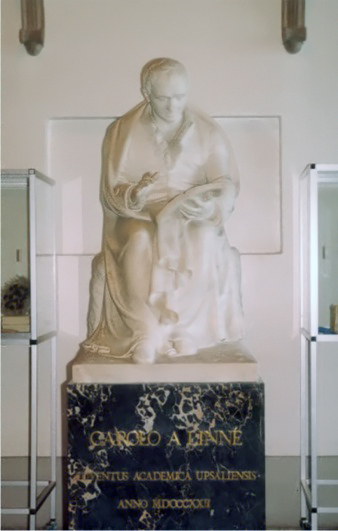
The statue of Linnaeus in the entrance hall of Carolina Rediviva, the main building of the university library, Uppsala

== Nobel laureates affiliated with Uppsala University ==
- Svante Arrhenius (1859–1927), Nobel Laureate in Chemistry 1903
- Allvar Gullstrand (1862–1930), Nobel Laureate in Physiology or Medicine 1911
- Robert Bárány (1876–1936), Nobel Laureate in Physiology or Medicine 1914
- Theodor (The) Svedberg (1884–1971), Nobel Laureate in Chemistry 1926
- Manne Siegbahn (1886–1978), Nobel Laureate in Physics 1924
- Arne Tiselius (1902–1971), Nobel Laureate in Chemistry 1948
- Hannes Alfvén (1908–1995), Nobel Laureate in Physics 1970
- Kai Siegbahn (1918–2007), Nobel Laureate in Physics 1981
- Erik Axel Karlfeldt (1864–1931), Nobel laureate in literature 1931 (posthumously)
- Pär Lagerkvist (1891–1974), Nobel laureate in literature 1951
- Hjalmar Branting (1860–1925), Nobel Peace Laureate in 1921
- Nathan Söderblom (1866–1931), Nobel Peace laureate in 1931
- Alva Myrdal (1902–1986), Nobel Peace Laureate in 1982
- Hugo Theorell (1903–1982), Nobel Laureate in Physiology or Medicine 1955 (worked at Uppsala University 1932–33 and 1935–36)
- Dag Hammarskjöld (1905–1961), Nobel Peace Laureate in 1961 (posthumously)
- Svante Pääbo (born 1955), Nobel Prize in Physiology or Medicine 2022

== Government, politics and civil service ==
=== Royalty ===
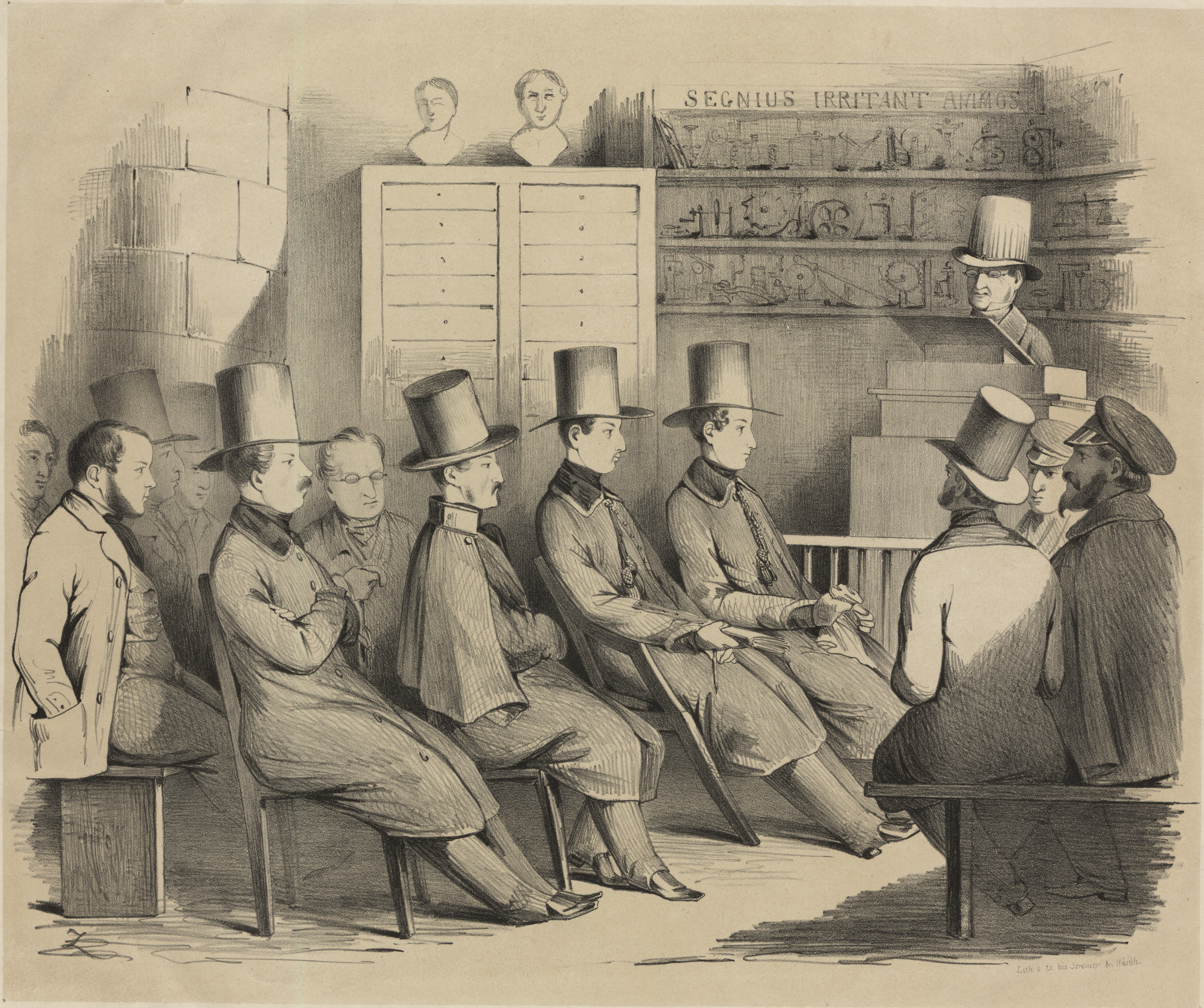
Crown Prince Carl (the later king Charles XV) and his brother Prince Gustaf, known as a song composer (the two young men closest to the pulpit), attending a lecture held by Law Professor Johan Christopher Lindblad (1799–1876) in the Theatrum Œconomicum, Uppsala. (Lithograph from 1846.)

- King Charles X of Sweden, matriculated 1638
- King Charles XV of Sweden, student in Uppsala 1843 and 1845 (spring semester 1844 in Christiania)
- Prince Gustaf, Duke of Uppland (1827–1852), song composer, matriculated 1844 and studied several semesters in Uppsala
- King Oscar II of Sweden
- Prince Carl, Duke of Västergötland (born 1861), student 1881–1882
- Prince Eugén, Duke of Närke, artist and art collector
- King Gustav V of Sweden
- King Gustaf VI Adolf of Sweden, also known as an accomplished archaeologist and connoisseur of East Asian art
- King Carl XVI Gustaf of Sweden
- Victoria, Crown Princess of Sweden, Duchess of Västergötland

=== International work ===
- Hans Blix (born 1928), diplomat; Swedish Minister of Foreign Affairs 1978–1979, head of the International Atomic Energy Agency 1981–1997; head of the UNMOVIC 2000–2003
- Hjalmar Branting (1860–1925), Prime Minister of Sweden (first Social Democrat in that position) for three periods, 1920–

1925; Nobel Peace Laureate in 1921

- Hans Corell (born 1939), diplomat; UN Under-Secretary-General for Legal Affairs
- Kåre Pugerup (born 1964), Chief of Staff at the United Nations agency IFAD in Rome
- Dag Hammarskjöld (1905–1961), UN Secretary General; Nobel Peace Laureate in 1961 (posthumously)
- Elinor Hammarskjöld (born 1967), Swedish lawyer and diplomat
- Samuel Gustaf Hermelin, Swedish Ambassador to the United States
- Per Jacobsson (1894–1963), Managing Director of the IMF 1956–1963
- Anna Lindh (1957–2003), Swedish Minister of Foreign Affairs; assassinated in 2003
- Alva Myrdal (1902–1986), politician, diplomat; Nobel Peace Laureate in 1982
- Trita Parsi (born 1974), founder and president of National Iranian American Council
- Carl Wahren (1933–2024), international aid consultant and population expert
- Jenny Ohlsson, diplomat; Swedish ambassador to Rwanda

=== Swedish politicians ===
- Nils Edén (1871–1945), historian and liberal politician; Prime Minister of Sweden 1917–1920
- Hjalmar Branting (1860–1925), Prime Minister 1920–1925
- Yngve Larsson (1881–1977), municipal commissioner (Borgarråd) of Stockholm, urbanist, statesman
- Paul Lindquist (born 1964), Mayor of Lidingö, BSc in Business Administration (1989)
- Valfrid Palmgren (1877–1967), one of the first female members of the Stockholm City Council; a reformer of the public libraries
- Lena Sommestad (born 1957), Minister for the Environment, Ph.D. in history (1992)
- Gustaf Nils Algernon Stierneld (1791–1868), Prime Minister for Foreign Affairs, 1838–1842 and 1848–1856
- Östen Undén (1886–1974), professor of civil law at UU, Minister for Foreign Affairs of Sweden 1924–1926 and 1945–1962
- Hans Henric von Essen (1755–1824), Governor of Stockholm, Governor-general of Norway
- Karl Gustaf Westman (1876–1944), leader of Bondeförbundet; held several ministerial posts; Minister of Justice 1936–1944
- Ulf Kristersson (born 1963), Prime Minister of Sweden since 2022

=== Non-Swedes ===
- Stane Dolanc (1925–1999), Yugoslav (Slovenian) politician, head of the security service under Tito
- Onésimo Silveira, Cape Verdean diplomat, politician and writer (Ph.D., Political science, 1976)
- Guðmundur Steingrímsson (born 1972), Icelandic politician

== Religion ==
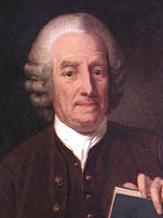
Emanuel Swedenborg

As Uppsala University has one of only two faculties of theology in Sweden, and the older one of the two (the other is in Lund), most Swedish churchmen of note have actually graduated from the university.

- Israel Acrelius (1714–1800), Lutheran missionary to New Sweden; author of History of New Sweden
- Johan Campanius (1601–1683), Lutheran clergyman assigned to New Sweden
- Nicolaus Olai Campanius (1593–1624), priest
- Lars Levi Laestadius (1800–1861), clergyman and botanist, founder of the conservative laestadian movement
- Nathan Söderblom (1866–1931), professor of comparative religion; later archbishop of Uppsala and Nobel peace laureate in 1931
- Emanuel Swedenborg (1688–1772), scientist, philosopher and religious mystic
- Carl Aaron Swensson (1857–1904), American Lutheran minister; founder of Bethany College
- Alf Tergel (1935–2007), professor of church history
- Gustaf Unonius (1810–1902), Episcopalian priest
- Georg Wallin the Elder (1644–1723), Lutheran Bishop of Gothenburg

== Natural sciences and medicine ==
=== Mathematics, physics and astronomy ===
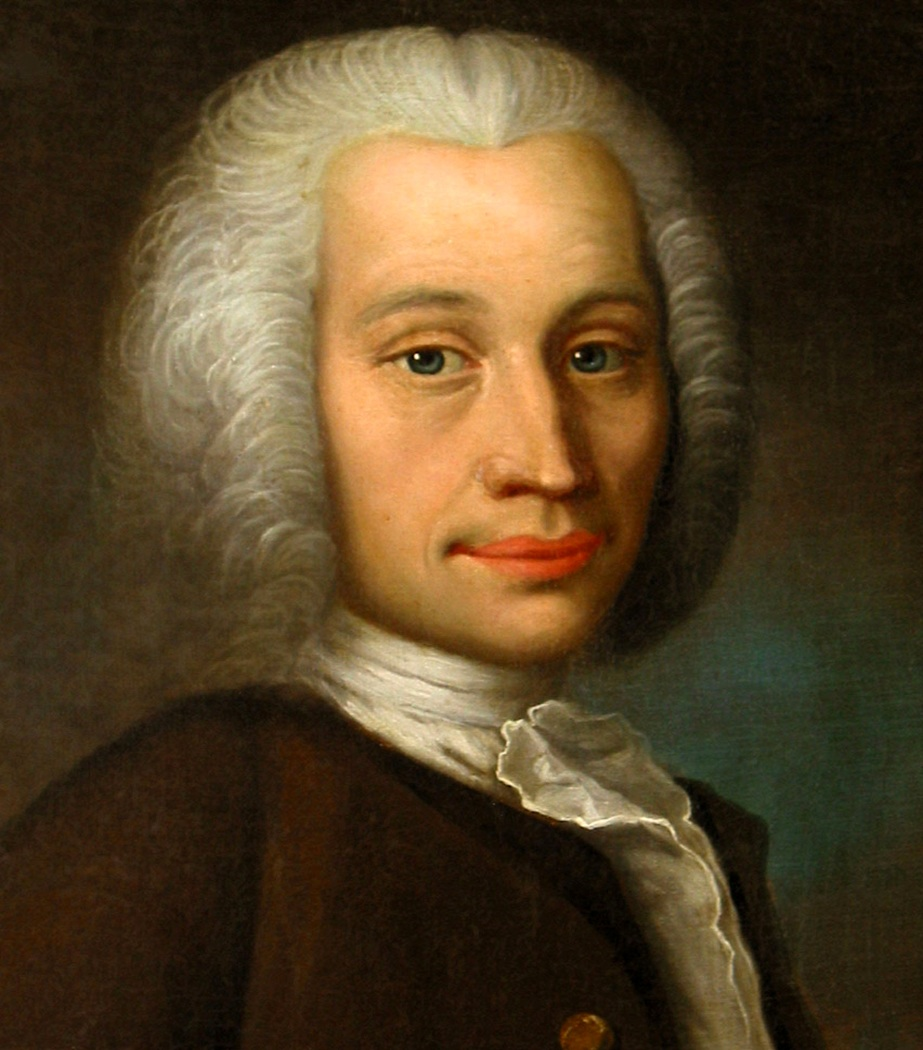
Anders Celsius

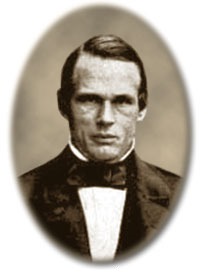
Anders Jonas Ångström

- Christopher Polhem (1661–1751), mechanical engineer and inventor
- Samuel Klingenstierna (1698–1765), mathematician and physicist
- Anders Celsius (1701–1744), physicist and astronomer; inventor of the centigrade scale, the predecessor of the Celsius scale
- Nils Wallerius (1706–1764), physicist, philosopher and theologian, made important discoveries in the field of hydrology
- Pehr Wilhelm Wargentin (1717–1783), astronomer, first head of the Stockholm Observatory
- Johan Carl Wilcke (1732–1796), physicist
- Anders Jonas Ångström (1814–1874), physicist, eponym of the unit ångström
- Herman Schultz (1823–1890), astronomer
- Tobias Robert Thalén (1827–1905), astronomer and physicist, awarded Rumford Medal 1884 "for his spectroscopic researches"
- Nils Christoffer Dunér (1839–1914), astronomer; professor of astronomy in Uppsala from 1888; awarded the Rumford Medal in 1892
- Oskar Backlund (1846–1916), astronomer
- Gösta Mittag-Leffler (1846–1927), mathematician; professor and Rector at Stockholm University College; founder of the journal Acta Mathematica (1882–); founder of the Mittag-Leffler Institute (Ph.D. 1872)
- Knut Ångström (1857–1910), physicist
- Ivar Otto Bendixson (1861–1935), mathematician, professor and Rector at Stockholm University College (M.A. 1881, Ph.D. 1890)
- Carl Charlier (1862–1934), astronomer, awarded the James Craig Watson Medal in 1924 and the Bruce Medal in 1933; professor and head of the Astronomical Observatory at Lund University
- Erik Ivar Fredholm (1866–1927), mathematician who established the modern theory of integral equations
- Helge von Koch (1870–1924), mathematician
- Thomas Hakon Grönwall (1877–1932), mathematician best known for Grönwall's inequality, taught at Princeton and Columbia (studied in Uppsala and Stockholm, awarded Ph.D. by Uppsala University in 1898)
- David Enskog (1884–1947), mathematician, Professor at the Royal Institute of Technology (Ph.D. 1917)
- Manne Siegbahn (1886–1978), physicist; Nobel Laureate in Physics 1924
- Fritz Carlson (1888–1952), mathematician, Professor at the Royal Institute of Technology and later at the Stockholm University College (Ph.D. 1914)
- Torsten Carleman (1892–1949), mathematician, Professor and Director of the Mittag-Leffler Institute in Stockholm (Ph.D. 1917)
- Gunnar Malmquist (1893–1982), astronomer, professor in Uppsala 1939–1959
- Bertil Lindblad (1895–1965), astronomer; professor and head of the Stockholm Observatory; awarded the Gold Medal of the Royal Astronomical Society 1948 and the Bruce Medal 1954
- Rolf Maximilian Sievert (1896–1966), physicist, professor at Stockholm University, eponym of the unit sievert (M.A. 1919)
- Erik Björkdal (1899–1952), meteorologist who studied at the Bergen School of Meteorology and was active in the World Meteorological Organization.
- Åke Wallenquist (1904–1994), astronomer
- Arne Beurling (1905–1986), mathematician
- Hannes Alfvén (1908–1995), physicist; Nobel Laureate in Physics 1970
- Kai Siegbahn (1918–2007), physicist; Nobel Laureate in Physics 1981; son of Manne Siegbahn
- Carl-Gösta Borelius (1919–1995), World War II cryptanalyst
- Lennart Carleson (born 1928), mathematician (Ph.D. 1950); professor at UU; later (after retirement) professor at UCLA; awarded the Wolf Prize in Mathematics in 1992 and the Abel Prize in 2006
- Ragnar Stefánsson (born 1938), physicist (1961) and seismologist (Ph.D. 1966); professor at the University of Akureyri
- Björn Engquist (born 1945), mathematician (Ph.D. 1975), professor at the Royal Institute of Technology and Princeton University
- Claes-Ingvar Lagerkvist (born 1944), astronomer
- Johan Håstad (born 1960), mathematician and computer scientist (M.Sc. 1984)
- Giuliano Di Baldassarre, Professor of Hydrology, Director of the Centre of Natural Hazards and Disaster Science, Sweden

=== Chemistry, geology and mineralogy ===
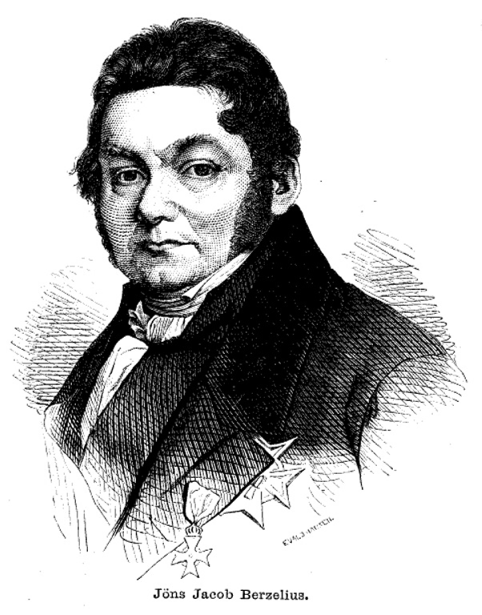
Jöns Jakob Berzelius

- Johan Gottschalk Wallerius (1709–1785), chemist and mineralogist
- Torbern Bergman (1735–1784), chemist
- Johan Gottlieb Gahn (1745–1818), mineralogist, discoverer of manganese
- Johan Gadolin (1760–1852), chemist, physicist and mineralogist
- Anders Gustaf Ekeberg (1767–1813), chemist, discoverer of tantalum
- Jöns Jakob Berzelius (1779–1848), physician and chemist, considered one of the fathers of modern chemistry; invented modern chemical notation and discovered the elements silicon, selenium, thorium, and cerium
- Nils Gabriel Sefström (1787–1845), chemist, discoverer of vanadium
- Johan August Arfwedson (1792–1841), chemist, discoverer of lithium
- Lars Fredrik Nilson (1840–1899), chemist, discoverer of scandium
- Per Teodor Cleve (1840–1905), chemist and geologist
- Gerard De Geer (1848–1943), geologist who made significant contributions to quaternary geology
- Svante Arrhenius (1859–1927), physicist and chemist; Nobel Laureate in Chemistry 1903
- Abraham Langlet, chemist who discovered helium in 1895 together with Per Teodor Cleve (independently from William Ramsay) and defined its atomic weight correctly; later professor at the Chalmers University of Technology
- V. Walfrid Ekman (1874–1954), oceanographer (Ph.D. 1902)
- Theodor (The) Svedberg (1884–1971), chemist; Nobel Laureate in Chemistry 1926
- Filip Hjulström (1902–1982), geographer (Professor 1944)

=== Medicine and life sciences ===
- Olaus Rudbeckius (1630–1702), a physician and professor of medicine as well as an engineer, architect and an imaginative writer of chauvinistic (pseudo)history
- Olaus Rudbeckius, junior (1660–1740), botanist
- Peter Artedi (1705–1735), naturalist and friend of Linnaeus; "the father of ichthyology"
- Carl Linnaeus (1707–1778), botanist, the father of taxonomy
- Students of Linnaeus:
  - Pehr Kalm (1716–1779), botanist
  - Fredric Hasselquist (1722–1752), naturalist and traveller
  - Peter Forsskål (1732–1763), explorer, orientalist and naturalist
  - Daniel Solander (1733–1782), botanist
  - Johann Beckmann (1739–1811), German scientific author, coiner of the word technology
  - Adam Kuhn (1741–1817), one of the first professors of medicine at the University of Pennsylvania, and thus one of the first in North America; for a time the family physician of George Washington; probably the only American student of Linnaeus
  - Johan Zoega (1742–1788), Danish botanist and economist
  - Carl Peter Thunberg (1743–1828), botanist
  - Johan Christian Fabricius (1745–1808), Danish entomologist
  - Anders Sparrman (1748–1820), physician and naturalist
  - Adam Afzelius (1750–1837), botanist
  - Anders Dahl (1751–1789), botanist, namesake of the dahlia flower
  - Jonas C. Dryander, naturalist and bibliographer, Librarian of the Royal Society, vice-president of the Linnean Society of London
  - Peter Gustaf Tengmalm (1754–1803), physician and naturalist
  - Erik Acharius (1757–1819), botanist
- Göran Wahlenberg (1780–1851), botanist
- Elias Magnus Fries (1794–1878), botanist, the father of modern mushroom taxonomy
- Alarik Frithiof Holmgren (1831–1897), physiologist
- Gustaf Retzius (1842–1919), anatomist; professor at Karolinska Institutet 1877–1890; member of the Swedish Academy; began his studies in Uppsala, where he took his med.kand., later transferred to KI and Lund University
- Hildegard Björck (1847–1920), first woman to complete an academic degree in Sweden
- Karl Oskar Medin (1847–1928), paediatrician, famous for his study of poliomyelitis; professor at the Karolinska Institutet 1883–1914; completed his doctorate in Uppsala 1880
- Adolf Appellöf (1857–1921), teuthologist
- Allvar Gullstrand (1862–1930), ophthalmologist; Nobel Laureate in Physiology or Medicine 1911
- Robert Bárány (1876–1936), physician, Nobel Laureate in Physiology or Medicine 1914 (professor in Uppsala from 1917)
- Frederik Kugelberg (1880–1963) MD and missionary
- Erik Stensiö (1891–1984), paleozoologist, professor at the Swedish Museum of Natural History, Stockholm; awarded the Linnean Medal of the Linnean Society of London 1957
- Erik Jarvik (1907–1998), paleozoologist, Professor at the Swedish Museum of Natural History, Stockholm (succeeded Erik Stensiö) (Ph.D. in Uppsala 1942)
- Arne Tiselius (1902–1971), biochemist; Nobel Laureate in Chemistry 1948
- Aino Käärik (1918–2021) Swedish botanist, microbiologist and professor (Ph.D. in Uppsala 1960)
- Inga Hedberg (1927–2024), Swedish botanist and academic
- Hilda Cid (born 1933), Chilean crystallographer
- Hans Rosling (born 1948), medical doctor, academic, statistician and public speaker
- Svante Pääbo (born 1955), evolutionary biologist

=== Explorers ===
- Sven Hedin (1865–1952; fil. kand. 1888; honorary doctorate 1935), known for his travels through Central Asia; last person to be ennobled in Sweden
- Finn Malmgren (1895–1928), Arctic explorer (Ph.D. in meteorology 1927, participated in several Arctic expeditions and died in one 1928)

== Humanities and social sciences ==
- Anna Ahlström (1863–1943), teacher, principal, school founder
- Johan Gunnar Andersson, archaeologist
- Tor Andræ, scholar of Comparative religion, orientalist, Bishop
- Per Daniel Amadeus Atterbom, poet, professor of poetry
- Anders Chydenius, clergyman, economist
- Bengt Danielsson, ethnologist, crewmember of Kon Tiki expedition
- Georges Dumézil, scholar of comparative religion, lecturer of French 1931–1933
- Michel Foucault, lecturer of French 1954–1958 (received the position through Dumézil)
- Erik Gustaf Geijer, historian, poet, composer
- Carl August Hagberg (1810–1864), linguist and translator
- Artur Hazelius (1833–1901), founder of the Nordic Museum and the open-air museum Skansen in Stockholm (Ph.D. 1860)
- Eli Heckscher, economic historian
- Johan Ihre, philologist
- Bernhard Karlgren, sinologist
- Rudolf Kjellén, political scientist
- Gerhard Lindblom (1887–1969), ethnographer, working in East Africa
- Mia Lövheim, professor of religious sociology
- Eva Lundgren, feminist scholar and sociologist
- Oscar Montelius, archaeologist
- Carl Gustaf Nordin (1749–1812), historian, antiquarian and politician, Bishop of Härnösand from 1812
- Adolf Noreen (1854–1925), linguist
- Chantal Radimilahy, archaeologist
- Henrik Samuel Nyberg, orientalist
- Ferdinando Sardella, historian of religions
- August Ludwig von Schlözer, studied 1755/56 with Johan Ihre
- Raj Somadeva, Archaeologist, Professor in Post Graduate Institute of Archaeology, University of Kelaniya, Sri lanka
- Knut Wicksell (1851–1926), economist
- Johan Widekindi (c 1619–1675), historian
- Herman Wold (1908–1992), statistician and economist

== Industry ==
- Christopher Polhem (1661–1751)
- Gustaf de Laval (1845–1913), engineer, co-founder of the present Alfa Laval
- Jan Stenbeck (1942–2002)
- Karl Jöreskog (born 1935), professor emeritus, co-author (with Dag Sörbom) of LISREL statistical program
- Hans Dalborg (born 1941)
- Carl-Henric Svanberg (born 1952)
- Maarit Toivanen (born 1954), Finnish business executive and Vuorineuvos
- Gunilla Asker (born 1962) CEO of Svenska Dagbladet
- Niklas Zennström (born 1966)

== Arts ==
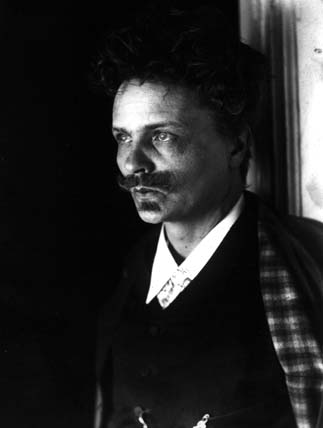
August Strindberg, photographic self-portrait

=== Literature ===
- Georg Stiernhielm (1598–1672), poet, linguist and civil servant
- Carl Michael Bellman (1740–1795), poet and composer (matriculated 1758 but left after less than a year)
- Erik Gustaf Geijer (1783–1847), historian, poet and composer
- Erik Johan Stagnelius (1793–1823), poet
- Per Daniel Amadeus Atterbom, poet
- Anders Leonard Bygdén (1844–1929), historian
- August Strindberg (1849–1912), novelist and playwright
- Henrik Schück (1855–1947), literary historian
- Axel Munthe (1857–1949), physician and writer
- Gustaf Fröding (1860–1911), poet
- Oscar Levertin (1862–1906), poet and critic
- Erik Axel Karlfeldt (1864–1931), poet; Nobel laureate in literature 1931 (posthumously)
- Hjalmar Söderberg (1869–1941), novelist
- Klara Johanson (1875–1948), literary critic, essayist
- Pär Lagerkvist (1891–1974), novelist, playwright; Nobel Laureate in Literature 1951
- Karin Boye (1900–1941), poet and novelist
- Gösta Knutsson (1908–1973), radio producer and author of children's books
- Sara Lidman (1923–2004), novelist
- Kerstin Ekman (born 1933), novelist
- Per Olov Enquist (born 1934), novelist
- Lars Gustafsson (1936–2016), novelist
- Peter Nilson (1937–1988), novelist, essayist and astronomer
- Håkan Nesser (born 1950), detective novelist
- Mari Jungstedt (born 1962), journalist and novelist
- Ola Larsmo (born 1957), novelist
- Kevin MacNeil, novelist, poet and playwright; former Writer in Residence at Uppsala
- Katrine Marçal, journalist and author

=== Music ===
- Prince Gustaf, Duke of Uppland (1827–1852), song composer, matriculated 1844 and studied several semesters in Uppsala
- Gunnar Wennerberg, composer, politician and civil servant
- Hugo Alfvén, composer, director musices of Uppsala University
- Wilhelm Stenhammar, composer, director musices of Uppsala University
- Lars-Erik Larsson, composer, director musices of Uppsala University
- Jacob Winchester, composer, sound designer, director, writer
- Herbert Blomstedt, orchestral conductor
- Petter Askergren (known as "Petter"), Swedish rap artist
- Rickard Westman, member of folk music group Garmarna

=== Theatre and entertainment ===
- Tage Danielsson, writer and entertainer (matriculated 1949, MA 1955, was vice chairman of Uppsala Student Union)
