= List of Lund University people =

This is a list of notable people affiliated with Lund University, either as students or as researchers and academic teachers (or both). Lund University, located in the town of Lund in Skåne, Sweden, was founded in 1666.

== Nobel laureates affiliated with Lund University ==
- Manne Siegbahn (1886-1978), Physics 1924; professor at Uppsala University (B.A. 1908, Ph.D. 1911)
- Bertil Ohlin (1899-1979), Economics 1977; professor at the Stockholm School of Economics; leader of the liberal Liberal People's Party, 1944-1967 (B.A. 1917)
- Sune Bergström (1916-2004), Medicine 1982 (Professor 1947-1958)
- Arvid Carlsson (1923-2018), Medicine 2000 (M.D. 1951, Assistant Professor 1951-1959)
- Anne L'Huillier (1958– ), Physics 2023 (Professor since 1997)

== Government, politics and civil service ==
- Gbehzohngar Milton Findley (1960–), Liberian politician and businessman, former Senate Pro-tempore, and former Minister of Foreign Affairs
- Peter Estenberg (1686–1740), Greek scholar, professor, and advisor to King Stanislaw (Stanisław Leszczyński) of Poland in the early 18th century
- Lars von Engeström (1751–1826), statesman and diplomat, first Prime Minister for Foreign Affairs 1809–1824, Chancellor of Lund University 1810–1824
- Arvid Posse (1820–1901), Prime Minister of Sweden 1880–1883 (B.A. 1840)
- Östen Undén (1886–1974), Rector Magnificus of Uppsala University and politician; Minister for Foreign Affairs 1924-26, 1945-62 (B.A. 1905, LL.B. 1910, LL.D. 1912)
- Ernst Wigforss (1881–1977), linguist and politician, Swedish Minister of Finance (Ph.D. 1913)
- Per Edvin Sköld (1891–1972), held various cabinet posts from 1932, Minister of Finance 1949–1955 (B.A. 1917)
- Bertil Ohlin (1899–1979), liberal leader and economist, Nobel laureate, see above
- Tage Erlander (1901–1985), Prime Minister of Sweden, 1946–1969 (B.A. 1928)
- Gunnar Jarring (1907–2002), ambassador, UN diplomat and scholar of Turkic languages (Ph.D. 1933)
- Ingvar Carlsson (1934–), Prime Minister of Sweden 1986-91, 1994-96 (B.A. 1958)
- Tarja Cronberg (1943–), Finnish Green Party politician, Member of the European Parliament (Eng. D. 1973)
- Lena Ek (1958–), Member of the European Parliament (J.D., LL.D.)
- Ruth Bader Ginsburg (1933–2020), Associate Justice of the United States Supreme Court 1933–2020; studied at Lund in the 1960s
- Rupiah Banda (1937–2022), President of Zambia, 2008-2011 (B.A. 1964)
- Jeremiah Lucas Opira (1933–2000), Ugandan politician who held various posts and was Organisation of African Unity expert in the 1960s (B.A. 1978)
- H. M. G. S. Palihakkara (1948–), Sri Lankan ambassador and UN diplomat, studied at Lund in the 1980s
- Jimmie Åkesson (1979–), politician for the Sweden Democrats, Member of the Swedish Parliament
- Fredrik Florén (1971-), Swedish ambassador to Tunisia, Libya, Bahrain, Kuwait, UAE (M.A. 1996)

== Mathematics, physics and astronomy ==
- Axel Möller (1830-1896), astronomer (Ph.D. 1853, professor 1863-1895)
- Albert Victor Bäcklund (1845-1912), mathematician and physicist (Bäcklund transform) (Ph.D. 1868, professor from 1878)
- Johannes Rydberg (1854-1919), physicist (Rydberg formula, Rydberg constant) (Ph.D. 1873, Professor from 1897)
- Carl Charlier (1862-1934), astronomer, awarded the James Craig Watson Medal in 1924 and the Bruce Medal in 1933 (Professor from 1897, head of the Lund Observatory)
- Adrian Constantin (1970-), Romanian-Austrian mathematician, winner of Wittgenstein Award
- Elis Strömgren (1870-1947), astronomer, Director of the Observatory at Copenhagen University (Ph.D. 1898)
- V. Walfrid Ekman (1874-1954), oceanographer (Ekman spiral, Ekman number) (Professor 1910-1939)
- Carl Wilhelm Oseen (1879-1944), mathematician and physicist, Director of the Nobel Institute for Theoretical Physics (Ph.D 1903)
- Manne Siegbahn (1886-1978), physicist, Nobel laureate, see above
- Anders Lindstedt (1854-1939) mathematician, astronomer and pioneer of actuarial science.
- Knut Lundmark (1889-1958), astronomer (Professor, head of Lund Observatory, 1929-1955)
- Gunnar Malmquist (1893-1982), astronomer (Ph.D. 1921)
- Oskar Klein (1894-1977), physicist (Docent 1926-30)
- Marcel Riesz (1886-1969), mathematician (Riesz function, Riesz theorems, Riesz mean, Riesz potential) (Professor from 1926)
- Lars Gårding (1919-2014), mathematician (Gårding's inequality) (Professor)
- Gunnar Källén (1926-1968) theoretical physicist (Professor)
- Lars Hörmander (1931-2012), mathematician, awarded the Fields Medal in 1962 (Ph.D. 1955, Professor from 1968)
- C. Göran Andersson (1951-), physicist and academic (Ph.D. 1980)
- Duncan Steel (1955-), authority on space science

== Medicine and life sciences ==
- Karl-Erik Andersson, pharmacologist and academic
- Johan Jacob Döbelius (1674-1743), professor of medicine, headmaster, discovered Ramlösa hälsobrunn
- Carl Linnaeus (1707-1778), father of modern taxonomy. (studied his first year in Lund, transferred to Uppsala)
- Johan Gottschalk Wallerius (1709-1785), chemist and mineralogist, member of the Royal Swedish Academy of Sciences
- Anders Jahan Retzius (1742-1821), naturalist
- Carl Fredrik Fallén (1764-1830), botanist and entomologist
- Axel Gustaf Gyllenkrok (1783-1865), zoologist
- Carl Adolph Agardh (1785-1859), naturalist (botanist); clergyman; bishop of Karlstad
- Johan Wilhelm Zetterstedt (1785-1874), entomologist
- Elias Magnus Fries (1794-1878), mycologist (student from 1811, Professor from 1824, from 1834 professor at Uppsala)
- Anders Retzius (1796-1860), anatomist
- Anders Gustaf Dahlbom (1806-1859), entomologist
- Jacob Georg Agardh (1813-1901), botanist
- Gustaf Retzius (1842-1919), anatomist
- Hildegard Björck (1847-1920), first woman in Sweden to earn an academic degree
- Sofia Holmgren (1864-1953), physician
- Erik Leonard Ekman (1883-1931), botanist and explorer of Hispaniola and Cuba
- Hjördis Lind-Campbell (1891-1984), physician, known for her work in sex education and founding of an adoption program for unmarried women.
- Dora Jacobsohn (1903-1983), physiologist and endocrinologist
- Rune Elmqvist (1906-1996), developed first implantable pacemaker (M.D.)
- Marianne Lindsten-Thomasson (1909-1979), physician, Sweden's first female district medical officer during the 1940s
- Sune Bergström (1916-2004), biochemist, Nobel laureate, see above
- Björn Folkow (1921-2012), professor in physiology at the University of Gothenburg between 1961 and 1987 and a member of the Royal Swedish Academy of Sciences.
- Arvid Carlsson (1923-2018), physician, Nobel laureate, see above
- Olle Hagnell (1924-2011), psychiatrist and epidemiologist
- Arne Strid (1943-), botanist
- Tracey Vivien Steinrucken, Rhodes Scholar, ecologist, molecular biologist

== Engineering ==
- Per Georg Scheutz (1785-1873), computing pioneer, Scheutzian calculation engine (J.D. 1805)
- Martin Wiberg (1826-1905), inventor, logarithmic table generating machines (Ph.D. 1850)
- Carl Hellmuth Hertz (1920-1990) pioneered medical ultrasonography (with Inge Edler) (Professor)
- Karl Johan Åström (1934-), control theorist, IEEE Fellow, IEEE Medal of Honor winner (Professor 1965-2002)
- Michael Treschow (1943-), Businessman, chairman of Ericsson (M.Eng.)
- Boris Smeds (1944-), radio engineer at ESA (M. Eng., Licentiate 1972, Honorary Doctor, 2006)
- Lennart Ljung (1946-), control theorist, IEEE Fellow (B.A. 1967, M.Sc. 1970, Ph.D. 1974)
- Jola Sigmond (1943-), architect, Swedish Association of Architects

== Humanities and social sciences ==
- Samuel Pufendorf (1632-1694), German jurist, political scientist and historian (Professor 1670-1677)
- Carl August Hagberg (1810-1864), linguist and translator
- Knut Wicksell (1851-1926), economist (Professor 1900-1916)
- Torgny Segerstedt (1876-1945), scholar of comparative religion, anti-Nazi journalist (B.A. 1901, Docent 1903)
- Torsten Hägerstrand (1916-2004), cultural geographer (Ph.D. 1953, Professor)
- Axel Leijonhufvud (1933-2022), economist (B.A.)
- Judith Wallerstein (1921-2012), psychologist and researcher at University of California at Berkeley (Ph.D. 1978)
- Håkan Wiberg (1942-2010), Peace researcher, sociologist (Ph.D. 1977, Professor 1980-88), mathematics (B.A.), philosophy (B.A.); Director of the Lund University Peace Research Institute (LUPRI)(1971-80), Director of the Copenhagen Peace Research Institute (COPRI)(1988-2001), member DIIS (2002-2007)
- Margot Bengtsson (1943-), psychologist
- Etzel Cardeña (1957-), Thorsen Professor of Psychology; Director of the Center for Research on Consciousness and Anomalous Psychology
- Katsuya Kodama (1959-), Japanese sociologist and peace researcher
- Marianne Gullberg (1964-), psycholinguist
- Emmily Kamwendo-Naphambo, Malawian sociologist, Deputy Representative UNFPA Ghana.

== Literature ==
- Bengt Lidner (1757-1793), poet. (Student 1774-1776)
- Thomas Thorild (1759-1808), poet, critic and philosopher
- Esaias Tegnér (1782-1846), poet, bishop of Växjö (B.A. 1802, Professor 1812-1824)
- Frans G. Bengtsson (1894-1954), author, The Long Ships (Licentiate 1930)
- Eva Alexanderson (1911-1994), novelist, translator (B.A. 1935)
- Susanna Roxman (1946-2015), writer, poet and critic (studied at King's College, London University, then at Lund University; later PhD in Gothenburg)
- Dilruba Z. Ara (1957-), writer
- Orlando E. Toledo Morales (1964 -), philosopher, writer, author and essayist

== Music, theatre, and entertainment ==
- Otto Lindblad (1809-1864), composer (Student 1829-1836)
- Sten Broman sv:Sten Broman (1902-1983), musician, music critic, TV host; founder of Uarda-akademien.
- Hans Alfredson (1931-2017), writer, entertainer and film director, former head of Skansen (B.A. 1956)
- Royal Republic Rock band (All members attended)
- Jens Bergensten (1979-), CCO of Mojang Studios, lead designer of Minecraft (M.Sc. 2008)

== Honorary doctorates ==
- John Ericsson (1803-1889), inventor, father of the USS Monitor (1868)
- Carver Mead (1934-), computer scientist (1987)
- Thomas Mann (1875–1955), novelist (1949)
- Gustavus Simmons (1930-), cryptographer (1991)
- Kofi Annan (1938-2018), UN Secretary General (1999)
- Santiago Calatrava (1951-), architect (1999)
