= Lists of Swedes =

List of lists of notable people from Sweden

This is a list of lists of notable Swedes.

== By country or ethnicity ==
- List of Sami people
- List of Lebanese people in Sweden
- List of Swedish Americans
- List of Swedish Jews

== By university ==
- List of Lund University people
- List of Stockholm School of Economics people
- List of Uppsala University people

== By city ==
- List of people from Gothenburg
- List of people from Malmö
- List of people from Stockholm

== By occupation ==
- List of Swedish actors
- List of Swedish architects
- List of Swedish artists
- List of Swedish billionaires by net worth
- List of Swedish clergy and theologians
- List of Swedish consorts
- List of Swedish entrepreneurs
- List of Swedish film directors
- List of Swedish folk musicians
- List of Swedish journalists
- List of Miss Sweden titleholders
- List of Swedes in music
- List of painters from Sweden
- List of Swedish women photographers
- List of Swedish poets
- List of Swedish politicians
- List of Swedish royal mistresses
- List of Swedish saints
- List of Swedish scientists
- List of Swedish sportspeople
- List of members of the Swedish Academy
- List of Swedish women artists
- List of Swedish women writers

== See also ==
- List of Swedish-language writers
- List of Swedish-speaking Finns
