= Jola =

Jola may refer to:

- Jola people, an ethnic group of West Africa
- Jola languages, a dialect continuum spoken in west Africa
- Jola Jobst (1915–1952), German actress
- Jola Sigmond (born 1943), Swedish architect
- Jola (fungi), a genus of fungi in the order Platygloeales
- Sorghum bicolor, a type of grain

== See also ==
- Johann Lamont, Scottish politician whose name is sometimes abbreviated as JoLa
- Jolas (disambiguation)
- Jolanta, a given name
