= List of people from Malmö =

This is a list of people from Malmö, Sweden, filed by occupation and listed in alphabetical order by surname.

== Academia ==
- Gunilla Florby (1943-2011), professor of English literature
- Bo Rothstein (born 1954), political science professor at the University of Gothenburg, and formerly at the University of Oxford

== Actors and filmmakers ==
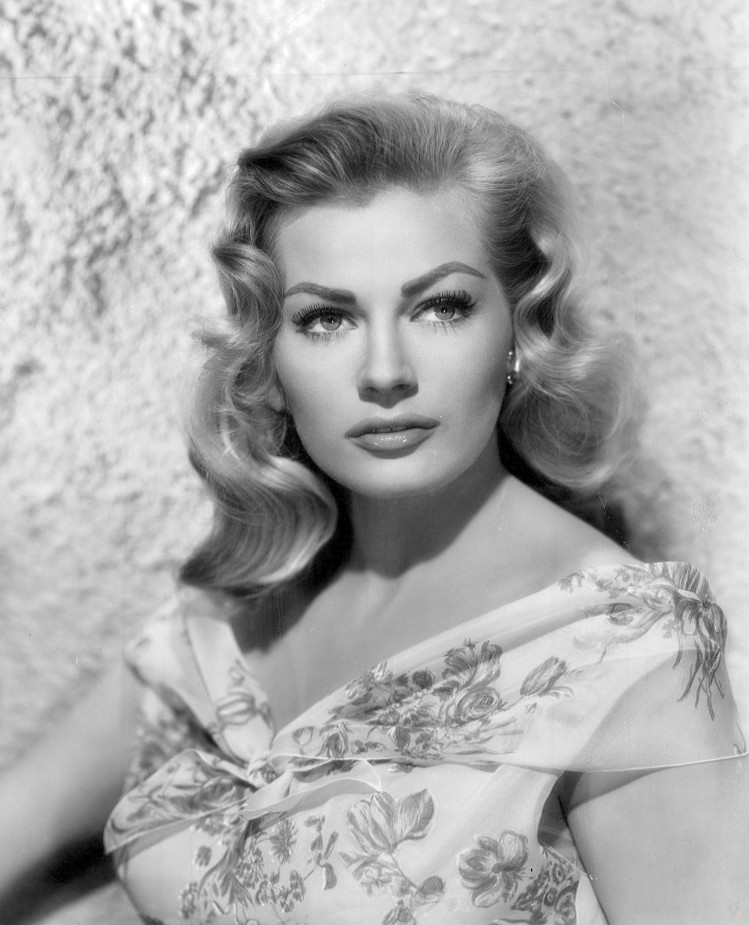
Anita Ekberg

- Anita Ekberg (1931–2015), model and actress
- Sofia Helin (born 1972), actress, played Saga Norén on The Bridge
- Lukas Moodysson (born 1969), film director
- Eva Rydberg (born 1943), singer, actress, comedian, revue-artist and dancer
- Leif Thorsson (born 1945), jurist
- Jan Troell (born 1931), film director
- Bo Widerberg (1930–1997), film director

== Art and design ==
- Monika Larsen Dennis (born 1963), sculptor, filmmaker, photographer
- Anna Friberger (born 1944), illustrator and set designer

== Medical ==
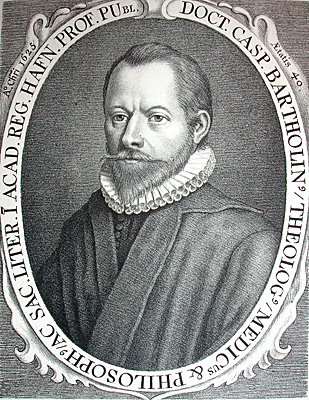
Caspar Bartholin

- Caspar Bartholin (1585–1629), medical scholar
- Elina Berglund (born 1984), physicist

== Music ==
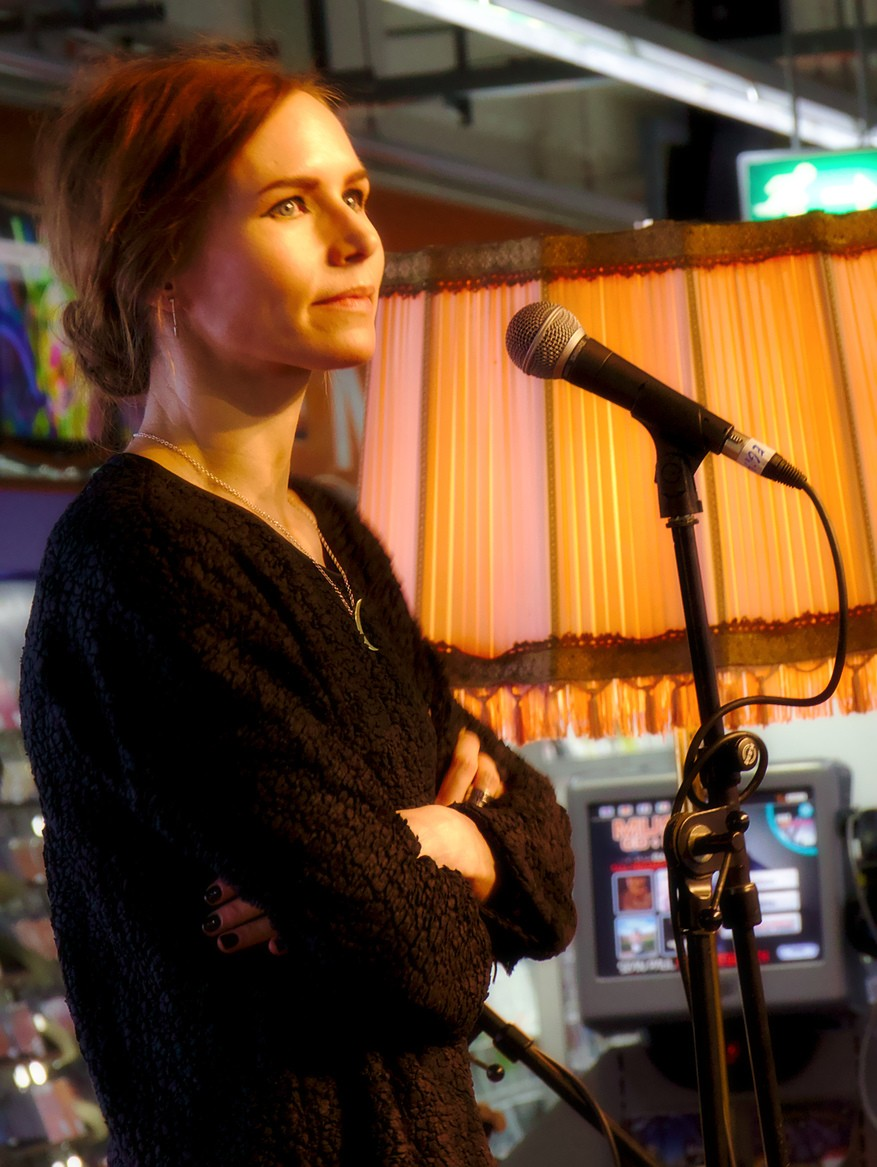
Nina Persson

- Björn Afzelius (1947–1999), musician
- Hasse Andersson (born 1948), country singer and songwriter
- The Cardigans, since 1994, pop-rock-punk musical band
  - Nina Persson (born 1974), singer and lyricist, The Cardigans
- Adrian Erlandsson (born 1970), musician
- Håkan Hardenberger (born 1961), trumpet player
- Maja Ivarsson (born 1979), lead singer of The Sounds
- Jonny Jakobsen (born 1963), musician
- Arash Labaf (born 1977), singer
- Magnus Martensson (born 1966), musician and comedian
- Amplitude Problem (born 1974), birth name Juan Irming; Swedish-American musician and producer
- Promoe (born 1976), rapper and member of LoopTroop Rockers
- May Qwinten (born 1983), pop and rock singer
- Mats Söderlund (born 1969), singer, club manager, and model
- Timbuktu (born 1975), rapper and reggae artist
- Lilly Walleni (1875–1920), opera singer
- Svea Nordblad Welander (1898–1985), musician and composer
- Jacques Werup (1945–2016), poet, author, jazz musician

== Politicians ==
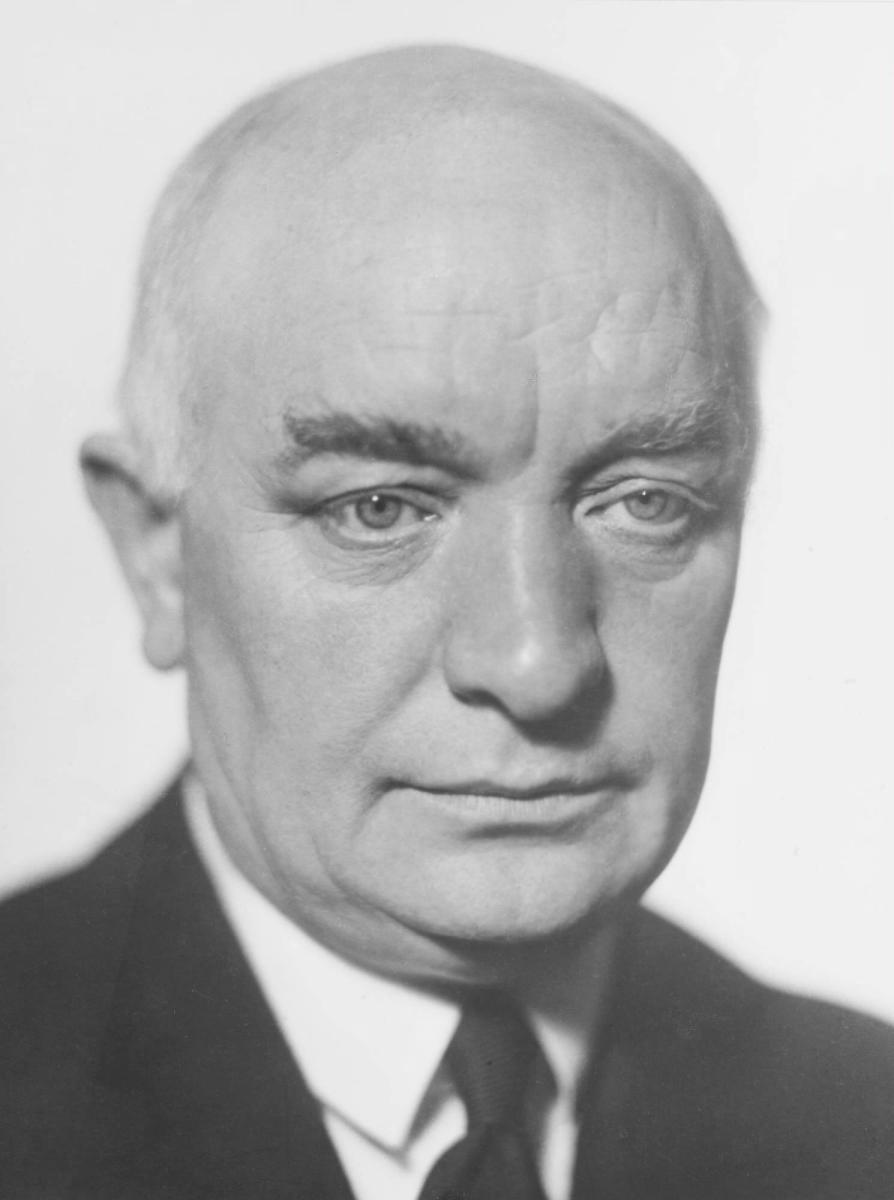
Per Albin Hansson

- Per Engdahl (1909–1994), pro-Nazi politician
- Per Gahrton (1943–2023), politician, Member of Parliament and Member of European Parliament
- Per Albin Hansson (1885–1946), politician, Prime Minister of Sweden (1932–1946)
- Mirjam Katzin (born 1986), politician, academic, and lawyer
- August Palm (1849–1922), politician, founder of the Swedish Social Democratic Party
- Ilan Sadé (born 1978), lawyer, debater, and politician

== Sports ==
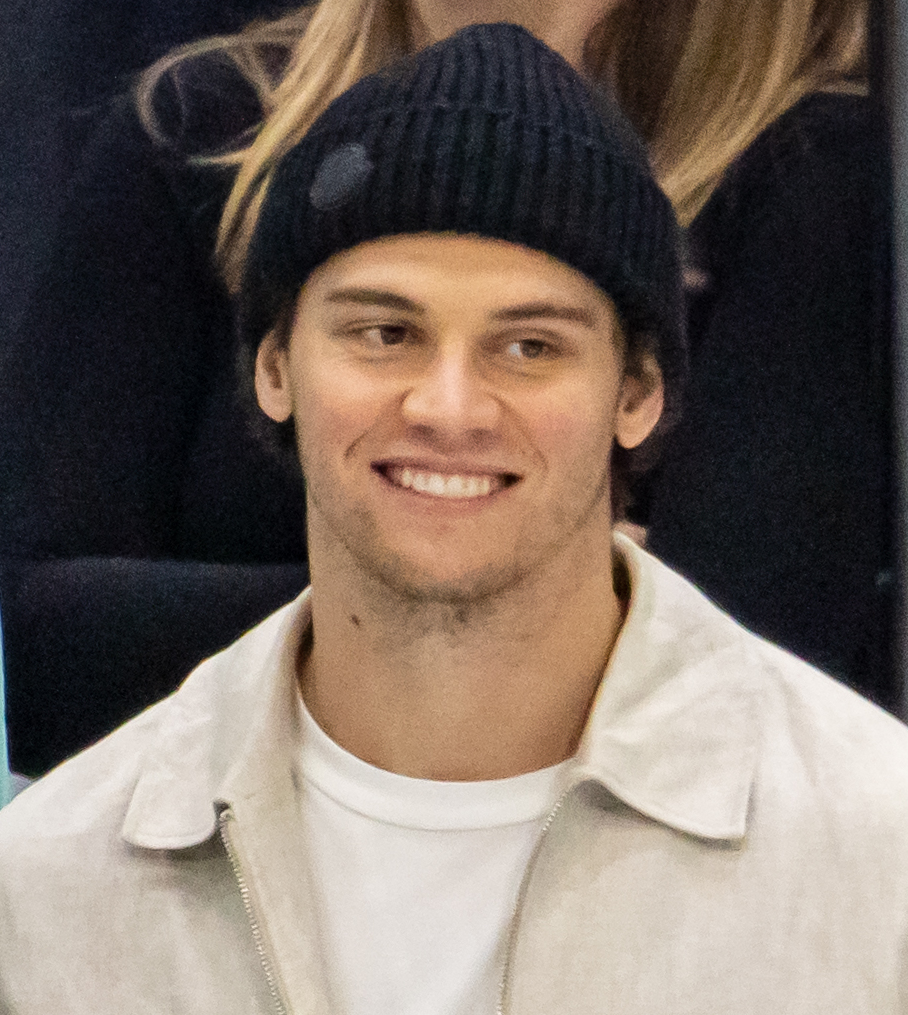
André Burakovsky

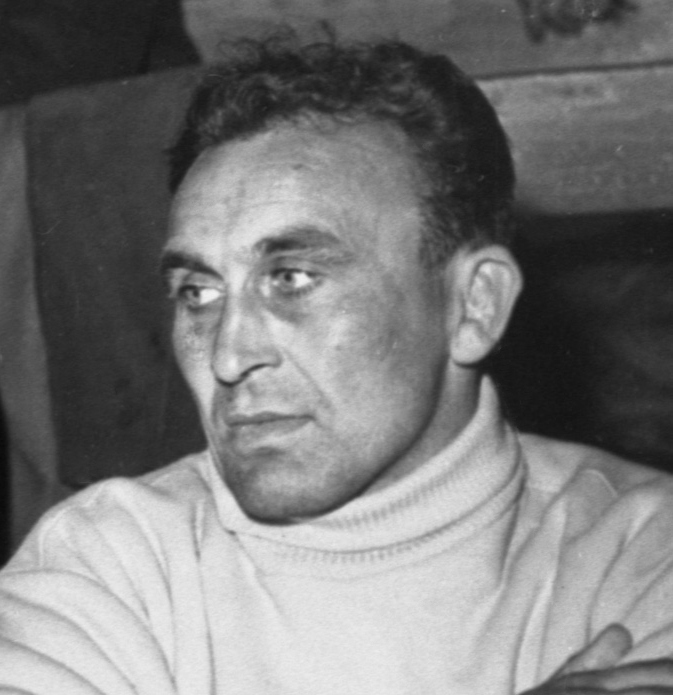
Gustav Freij

- Stefan Schwarz (born 18/04/1969), Former football player https://pt.wikipedia.org/wiki/Stefan_Schwarz
- Anel Ahmedhodžić (born 1999), football player
- Rasmus Andersson (born 1996), ice hockey player
- André Burakovsky (born 1995), NHL hockey player
- Robert Burakovsky (born 1966) former NHL hockey player, current hockey coach
- Anthony Elanga (born 2002), football player, currently representing Nottingham Forest in the Premier League and the Swedish National Football Team
- Gustav Freij (1922–1973), wrestler, Olympic gold medalist
- Zlatan Ibrahimović (born 1981), football player
- Pontus Jansson (born 1991), football player
- Kim Johnsson (born 1976), ice hockey player
- Fredrik Jonsson (born 1977), tennis player
- Bobi Klintman (born 2003), basketball player
- Ilir Latifi (born 1983), mixed martial arts fighter
- Yksel Osmanovski (born 1977), football player
- Mikael Pernfors (born 1963), tennis player
- Eric Persson (1898–1984), chairman of the football club Malmö FF
- Christian Wilhelmsson (born 1979), football player

== Writers ==
- Luai Ahmed (born 1993), Yemen-born Swedish journalist and columnist
- Börje Dorch (1929–2004), draughtsman and writer
- Hjalmar Gullberg (1898–1961), poet, member of the Swedish Academy
- Björn Ranelid (born 1949), author
- Mats Wahl (1945–2025), writer and dramatist

== Others ==
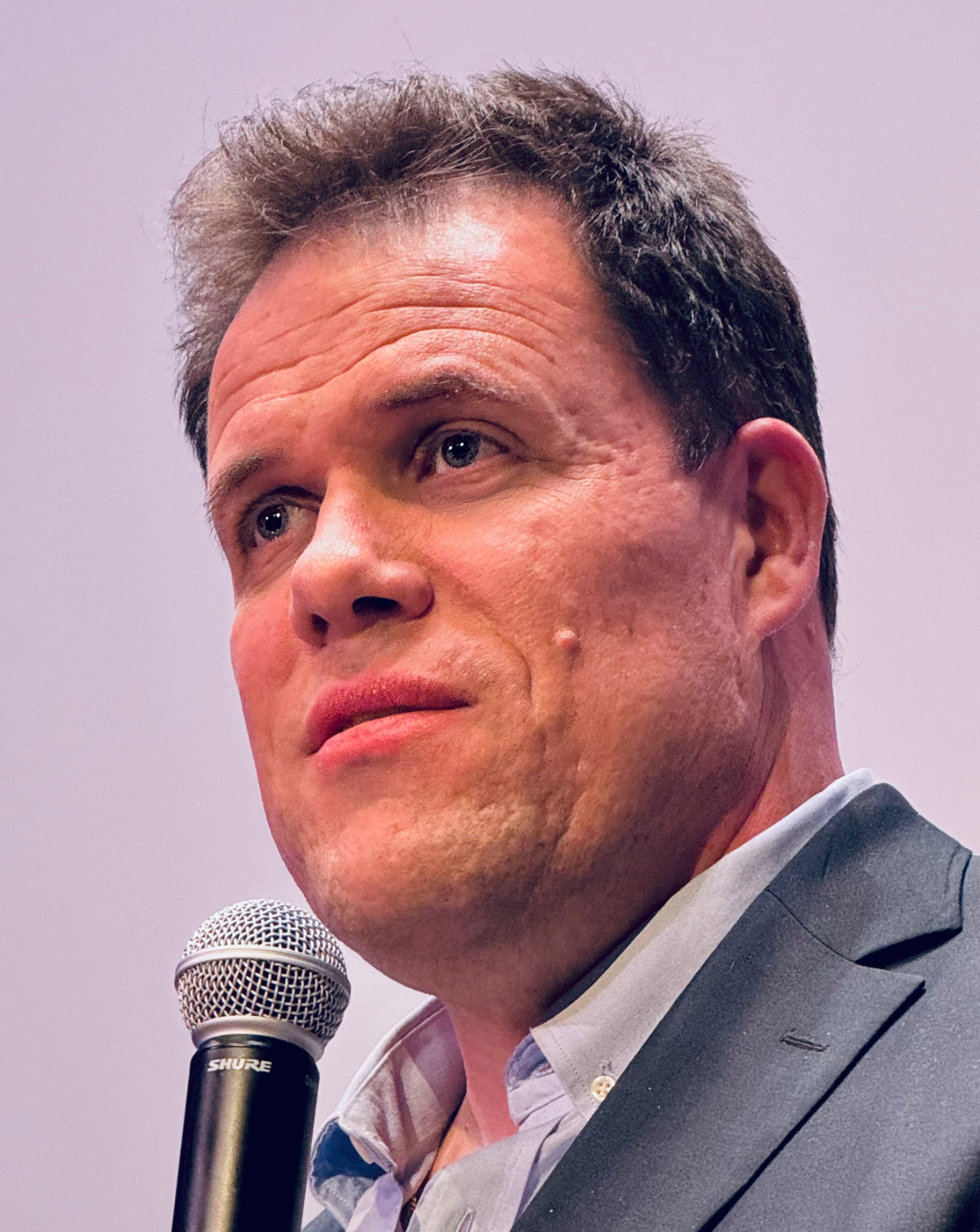
Jonathan Conricus

- Marlon Lundgren Garcia (born 2001), Swedish, Spanish and American streamer
- Jonathan Conricus (born 1979), Swedish-Israeli IDF Lieutenant-Colonel (ret), IDF International Spokesperson
- Siavosh Derakhti (born 1991), social activist, and founder of Young People Against Anti-Semitism and Xenophobia
- Märta af Ekenstam (1880–1939), silversmith
- Frans Ekelund (1882–1965), architect.
- Beata Losman (born 1938), archivist
- Felix von Luckner (1881–1966), sailor
- Henrik Reuterdahl (1795–1870), Archbishop of Uppsala (1856–1870)
- Frans Suell (1744–1818), businessman who built the Malmö harbour
- Ingegerd Engfelt (1953–1989), businesswoman who founded Track Tape
