= Elna Hansson =

Swedish cunning woman and feldsher (1814–1891)

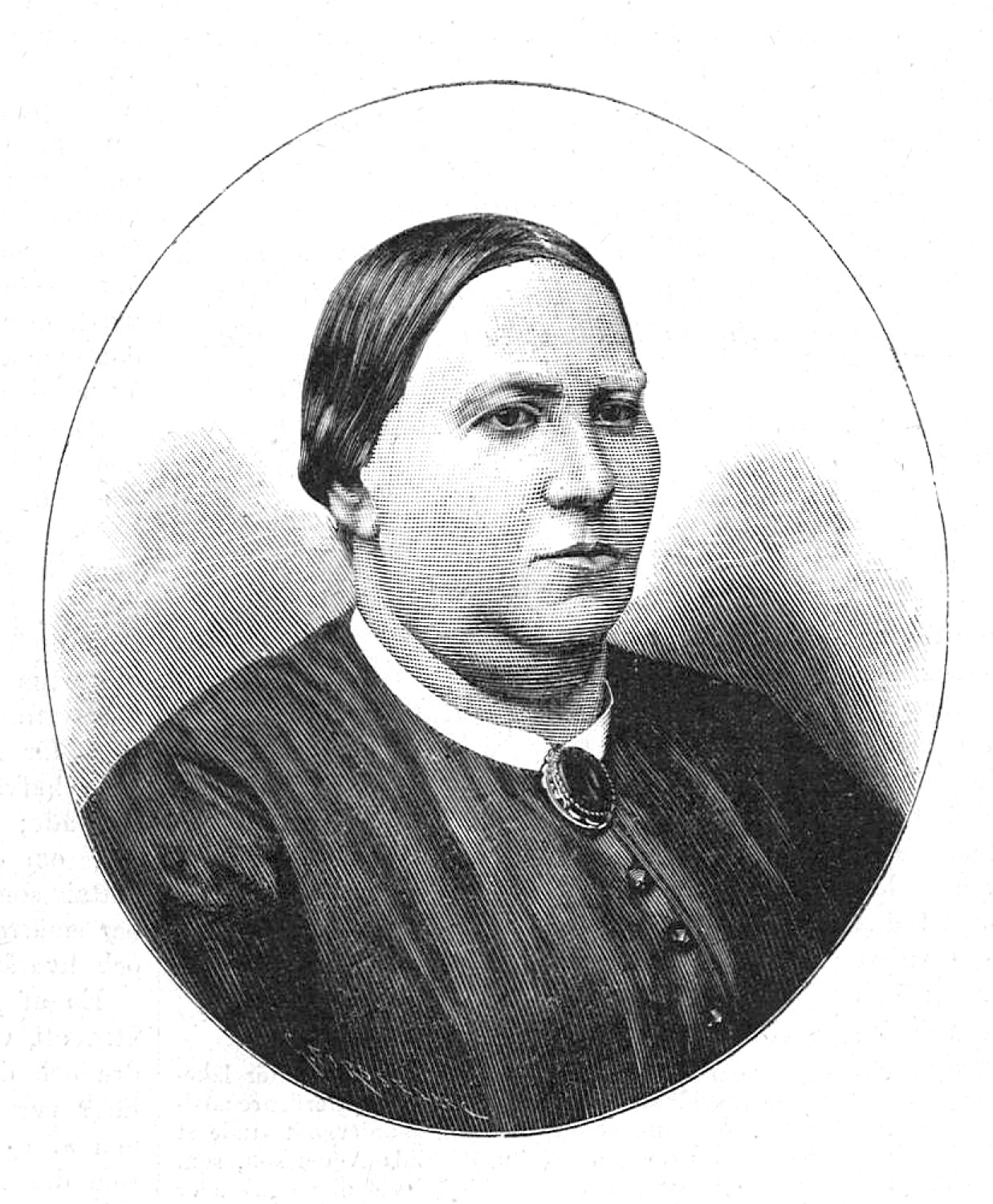
Elna Hansson

Elna Hansson (10-08-1814 – 21-01-1891), was a Swedish cunning woman and feldsher. As a practitioner of folk medicine, she was the first woman feldsher in Sweden.

== Life ==
Elna was the daughter of the cunning woman Marna Nilsdotter of Lund and was the fifth generation of cunning women in a family famous for practicing traditional medicine. Marna was the daughter of Elna Hansdotter, the daughter of Sissa Mårtensdotter, the daughter of Elna Persdotter, and the family had over 100 years of healing history when Elna started to practice. Elna became the mother of the cunning woman Johanna Maria Andersson, and the grandmother of Hedda Andersson.

Elna settled in Malmö after her marriage to farm labourer Hans Månsson in 1833, and established herself as a medical practitioner. As her mother before her, she specialized in the healing of wounds and fractures. In contrast to most cunning practitioners of her time, she did not use any magic spells during her work, which contributed to her good name as she came to be regarded more as a scientific physician. She was widely credited for her success in managing to heal severe injuries which would otherwise have caused amputations, and which educated physicians before her had failed to cure, and thus having saved many from becoming invalids. She received clients from all over South Sweden, Norway and Denmark. Her good name was sufficient for town - and military - physicians to recommend her to patients they had failed to cure.

Regardless of her ability and success, she was still practicing without a license. In 1855, she was reported for quackery by the physician August Falck. She was summoned to court in 1856, and appealed to the king for dispensation to practice with reference to her long standing experience, success and content patients. The king received numerous letters from the public in support of Elna Hansson. Women were not allowed to study medicine, but in order to solve the issue, the king issued a royal letter granting permit for women to study surgery as feldshers in 1857. Elna Hansson took the feldsher exam in Stockholm and passed. She was thus likely the first woman feldsher in Sweden.

Her feldsher license allowed her to practice medicine openly, and she opened her own official clinic, with room for seven patients. She practiced until her death. Her daughter joined her practice as a widow in 1866, also with a permit to practice as a feldsher.

One of her patients was the author Victoria Benedictsson. Benedictsson described Hansson’s waiting room in her story, The Big Book.

In 1870, women were officially allowed to study medicine in Sweden. Elna Hansson and her daughter consequently decided that their granddaughter and daughter Hedda Andersson, the 7th-generation of a family of cunning women, should study medicine openly at the university and be given a medical license, to avoid the history of quackery charges which had affected their family: Hedda Andersson became the second formally-trained women physician in Sweden.
