= Jolas =

Jolas may refer to:

- Members of the Jola people of West Africa

== Name ==
- Betsy Jolas (born 1926), Franco–American composer
- Eugene Jolas (1894–1952), American translator and literary critic
- Maria Jolas (1893–1987), a founder of literary magazine transition

== Nickname ==
- Jojo Lastimosa, Filipino retired basketball player

== See also ==
- Jola (disambiguation)
