= Kevin MacNeil =

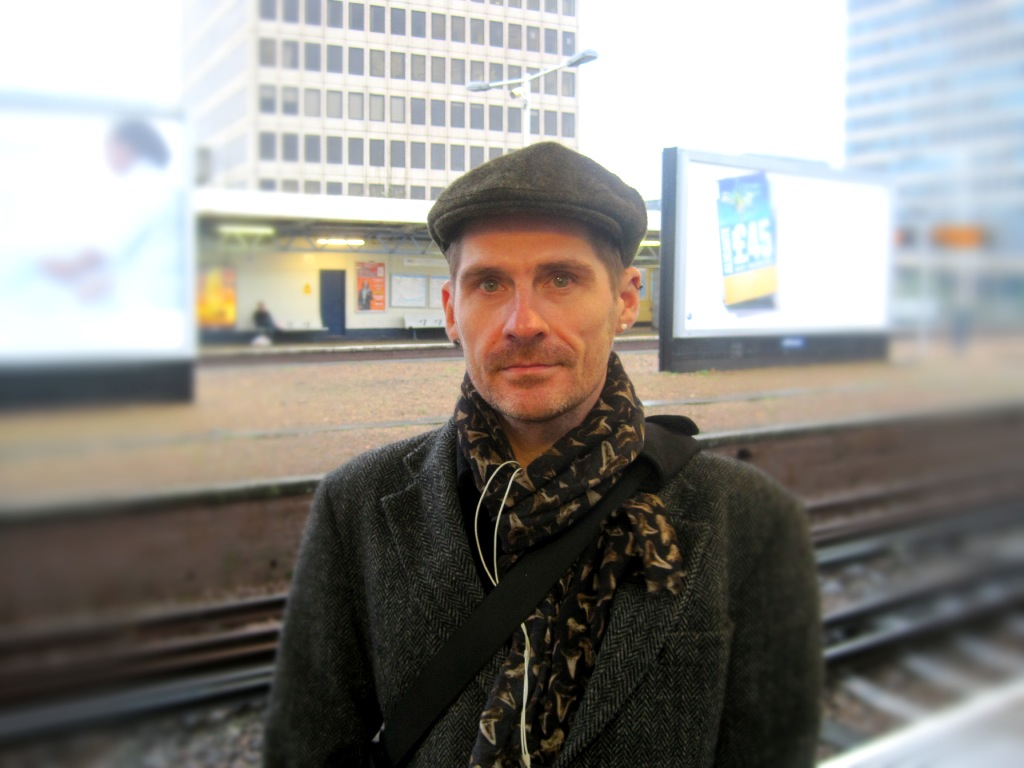
- MacNeil in 2012
- Born: 20th century Isle of Lewis, Scotland, U.K.
- Occupations: Novelist, poet, screenwriter, lyricist, playwright, educator
- Website: kevinmacneil.me

Kevin MacNeil (born 20th century) is a Scottish novelist, poet, screenwriter, lyricist, playwright and educator.

== Early life and education ==
MacNeil was born and raised on the Isle of Lewis in the Outer Hebrides.

== Career ==
=== Artistic collaborations ===
MacNeil has collaborated with Hebridean musician Willie Campbell. In 2011, they released the album Visible From Space together.

=== Teaching and fellowships ===
MacNeil has undertaken teaching posts and writing residencies in Sweden (Uppsala University), Bavaria (Villa Concordia), Shetland, the University of Edinburgh, and Kingston University. He has held the Hawthornden Fellowship and was Inaugural Recipient of the Iain Crichton Smith Bilingual Writing Fellowship. He has been a judge for the Highland Book Prize, the Wigtown Poetry Prize and the Scottish Book Trust New Writers' Award. He is a remote mentor and on-site residential short-course tutor for the Moniack Mhor Writers' Centre.

In 2017, he began a post at the University of Stirling, where he works as a tutor and supervisor for both undergraduate and postgraduate creative-writing–degree programs.

=== Awards ===
- Tivoli Europa Giovani International Poetry Prize

=== Works ===
==== As author ====
- Poetry collection: Love and Zen in the Outer Hebrides (Canongate, 1998)
- Collection: Be Wise, Be Otherwise (Canongate, 2001)
- Novel: The Stornoway Way (Hamish Hamilton, 2005)
- Play: The Callanish Stoned (produced by Theatre Hebrides, 2006)
- Novel: A Method Actor's Guide to Jekyll and Hyde (Polygon, 2011)
- Play: Sweetness (adaptation of work by Torgny Lindgren, produced by Dogstar Theatre, touring Scotland in 2011)
- Novel: The Brilliant & Forever (2016, Polygon)
- Screenplay: Hamish (2016)
- Collection: The Diary of Archie the Alpaca (2017, Polygon)
- Play: The Stornoway Way (produced by Dogstar Theatre, touring Scotland in 2019)

==== As editor ====
- Multicultural poetry and photography anthology: Wish I Was Here (Pocketbooks, 2000)
- Story anthology: The Red Door: The Collected English Stories of Iain Crichton Smith 1949–76 (Birlinn, 2002)
- Story anthology: The Black Halo: The Collected English Stories of Iain Crichton Smith 1977–98 (Birlinn, Edinburgh 2002)
- Poetry anthology: These Islands, We Sing (Polygon, 2011)
- Poetry and essay anthology: Struileag: Shore to Shore - Poems and Essays on the Gaelic Diaspora (Polygon, 2015)
- Anthology: Robert Louis Stevenson: An Anthology Selected by Jorge Luis Borges and Adolfo Bioy Casares (Polygon, 2017)

== Personal life ==
MacNeil is a speaker of Scottish Gaelic, has cycling as a hobby and is a practicing Buddhist, with interests in Scottish and Japanese culture and literature. He owns a rescue greyhound named Molly.

== See also ==
- List of people from London
- List of people from Stirling
- List of Scottish musicians
- List of Scottish novelists
- List of Scottish playwrights
- List of Scottish poets
- List of songwriters
- List of University of Edinburgh people
- List of Uppsala University people
