= Hedda Andersson =

Swedish physician

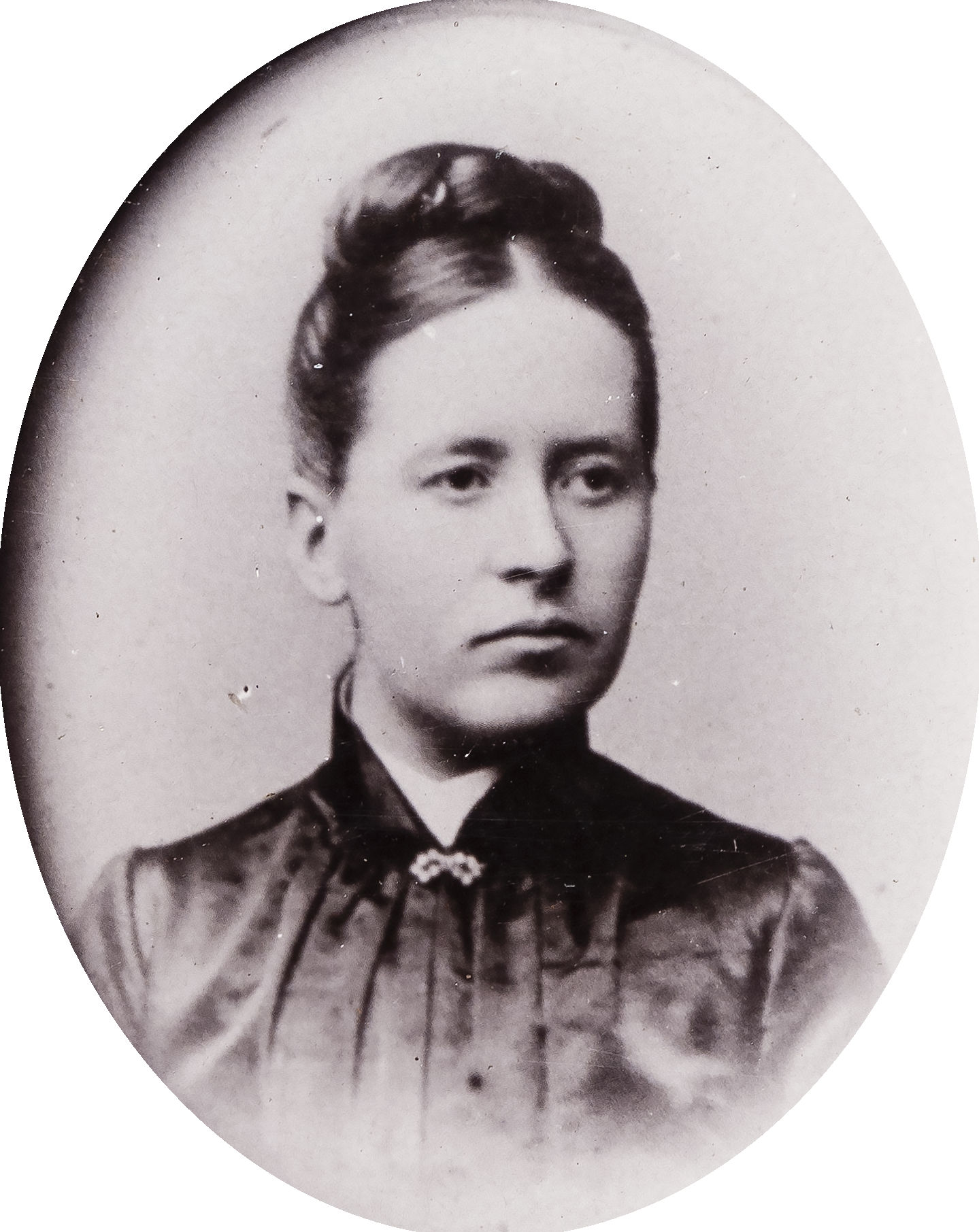
- Born: 24 April 1861; Malmö, Sweden
- Died: 7 September 1950 (aged 89); Lund, Sweden
- Education: Lund University
- Occupation: Physician
- Known for: Second university-educated woman physician in Sweden

Hedda Albertina Andersson (24 April 1861, in Malmö – 7 September 1950, in Lund), was a Swedish physician. She was the second female student at Lund University and the second university-educated woman physician in Sweden.

== Life ==
Hedda Andersson was the daughter of a male laborer named Andersson and the cunning woman Johanna Andersson. When her father died in 1866, she moved with her mother and three siblings to live with her grandmother.

On her mother's side, she descended from a line of medicine women, known to have practiced traditional folk medicine for at least seven generations, dating back to the 17th century. Hedda was the daughter of Johanna Andersson, who was the daughter of Elna Hansson, the daughter of Marna Nilsdotter, the daughter of Elna Hansdotter, the daughter of Sissa Mårtensdotter, the daughter of Elna Persdotter - the family had over 150 years of healing history when Hedda was born. Her mother and grandmother worked together as medical practitioners in Malmö. Her grandmother was famous in all Scandinavia as the Lundakvinnan ("Woman of Lund"), and had educated herself to a barber surgeon to avoid being accused of quackery, as did her daughter, the mother of Hedda, for the same reason.

When the universities of Sweden were opened to women in 1870, her mother and grandmother decided that she should study medicine at a university and obtain a formal license, to avoid being persecuted and accused of quackery, which had been the case with many women in the history of their family, such as her grandmother and mother. Hedda Andersson was educated at the school of Maria Stenkula, and was admitted to Lund University in 1880.

She has been referred to as the first female student there, though actually this was Hildegard Björck only shortly before. She was the only female there until 1882, but she was reportedly treated with respect by her male fellow students. She took her bachelor's degree in 1887 and her medical license in 1892. She thereby became the second female physician to have graduated from a Swedish university after Karolina Widerström. She also studied in Copenhagen in 1892 and 1895, and under Max Sänger in Leipzig in 1893.

She was active as a doctor in Ronneby 1892–95, in Malmö in 1893–95, and in Stockholm 1895–1925, after which she settled in Lund.

== Memorials ==
A Visiting scholar Professorship was created at the Lund University in 2009 in memory of Hedda Andersson.

== See also ==
- Betty Pettersson
- Emmy Rappe
- Sofia Holmgren
