= Algot Tergel =

Swedish priest, teacher and author (1906–1996)

Algot Tergel, born 8 August 1906 in Kyrkhult congregation, Blekinge County, died 12 October 1996 in Sigtuna congregation, Stockholm County, was a swedish priest, teacher and author.

Tergel was son to peasant Sven Bengtsson och Sissa Jönsson. He completed his elementary school teacher education in Lund 1927, became ordinary college teacher at Mjällby 1928 and served in Skåne-Tranås from 1929 to 1938.

After studentexamen in 1934 and renewed studies, he received his Master of Theology degree in 1938. He was ordained the same year in Lund and served thereafter in Lövestad and Simrishamn. He then became school- and seminary secretary at the Diaconal Board of the Church of Sweden in Stockholm 1942, priest in charge in Brännkyrka congregation in Stockholm 1949–51 and director at the Church of Sweden's layman school, in Sigtuna 1951–1971.

Tergel was one of the delegates that participated in the formation of the Swedish Christian Democrat party in 1964. He was a member of the board at Sigtunastiftelsen, president at The Church of Sweden Lay Movement and also in the Francis Society with engagements as tour guide destinated to Nordic Ecumenical Institute in Assisi.

In 1931, Algot Tergel married Hanna Månsson (1902–2004), who gave birth to four children: Alf Tergel, Gertrud, Birgitta and Gunilla.

== Bibliography ==
- Tergel, Algot (1972). Svenska kyrkans lekmannaskola 50 år i kyrkans tjänst (in Swedish). Sigtuna: Svenska kyrkans lekmannaskola.
- Tergel, Algot (1974). På vandring genom kyrkoåret: daglig läsning advent-pingst. Kyrkobrödernas skriftserie, 0345-0104; 3 (in Swedish). Stockholm.
- Tergel, Algot (1975). På vandring genom kyrkoåret: daglig läsning under trefaldighetstiden. Kyrkobrödernas skriftserie, 0345-0104; 4 (in Swedish). Stockholm: Verbum.
- Tergel, Algot (1976). Ett liv i bön. Kyrkobrödernas skriftserie, 0345-0104; 5 (in Swedish). Stockholm: Verbum/Studiebokförl.
- Tergel, Algot (1977). Vid bönens port. Kyrkobrödernas skriftserie; 6 (in Swedish). Sigtuna: Svenska kyrkans lekmannaförbund.
- Tergel, Algot (1980). Med Paulus som läromästare. Kyrkobrödernas skriftserie, 0345-0104; 8 (in Swedish). Stockholm: Skeab.
- Tergel, Algot (1982). Kravet och kraften. Kyrkobrödernas skriftserie, 0345-0104; 10 (in Swedish). Älvsjö: SkeabVerbum. ISBN 91-526-0966-9.
- Tergel, Algot (1985). Ett liv med Jesus. Kyrkobrödernas skriftserie, 0345-0104; 15 (in Swedish). Älvsjö: Verbum. ISBN 91-526-1280-5.
