= Carl Wahren =

Carl "Charlie" Wahren
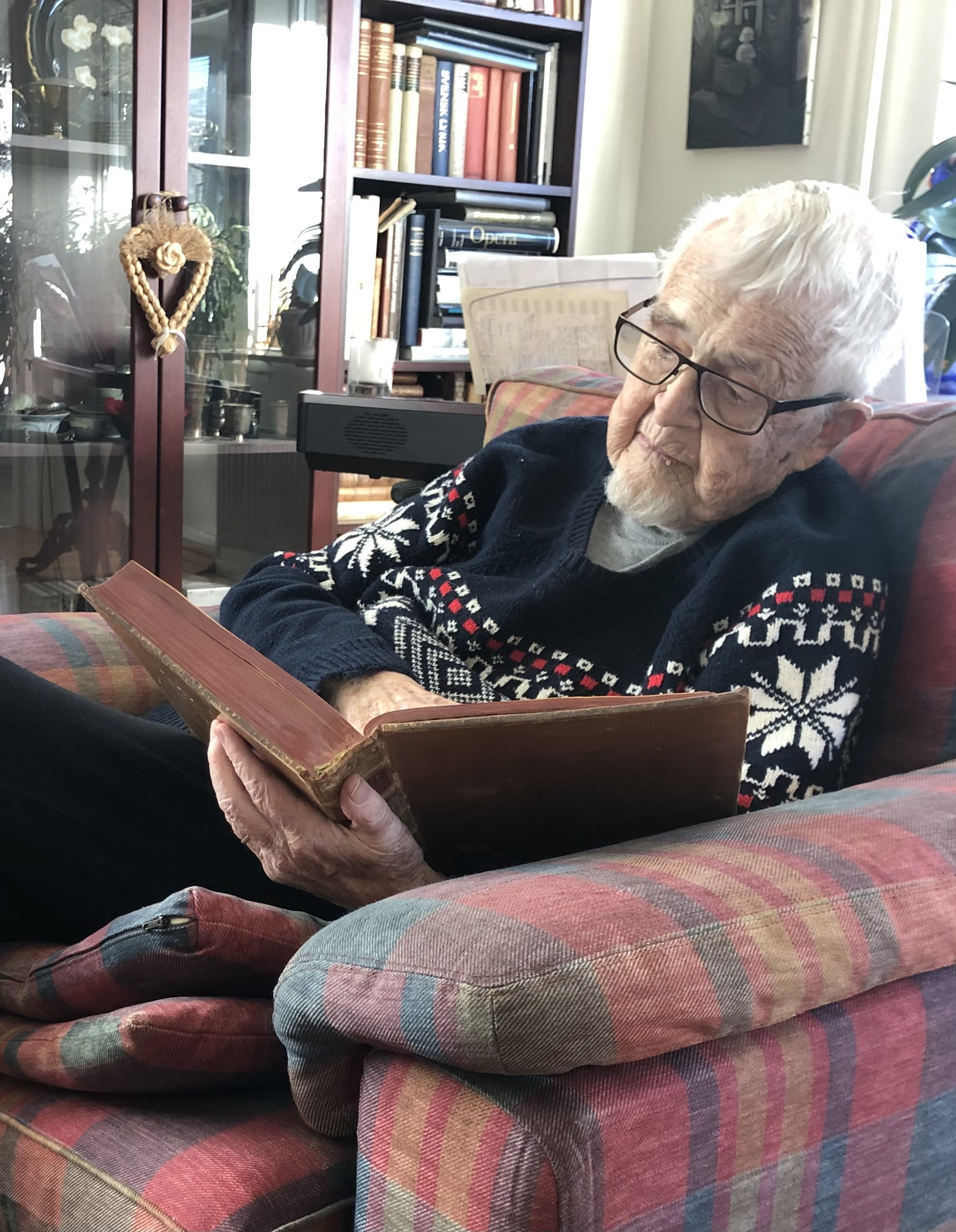
- Carl Wahren in his home in Täby, Sweden in 2024
- Born: Carl Wahren; 28 April 1933; Norrköping, Sweden
- Died: 13 April 2024 (aged 90); Täby, Sweden
- Education: Uppsala University; Collège Europeén des Sciences Sociales et Économiques (Paris)
- Occupations: population expert and consultant for international aid

Carl Wahren (28 April 1933 – 13 April 2024), also called "Charlie", was a Swedish population expert and consultant for international aid. He worked in family planning, population policy and around aid to developing countries. Between 1962 and 1997 he held leading positions at the Swedish International Development Agency, the International Planned Parenthood Federation (IPPF), the United Nations, and the OECD.

== Early life and education ==
Wahren was born in Norrköping. He studied at Uppsala University and obtained a Bachelor of Philosophy degree in political science and sociology in 1955. Then he studied in Paris, in European politics at the Collège Europeén des Sciences Sociales et Économiques.

In 1957, Wahren spent a summer at a kibbutz in Israel, under partly dramatic circumstances. Then he traveled in the Soviet Union with other students, a trip organized by the Komsomol, the youth wing of the Communist Party. For more details, see his Swedish autobiography.

In 1958, Wahren obtained a 2-year scholarship at the University of Southern California, USA. Here he acquired a Master of Arts degree, with a thesis on Yugoslavia's foreign policy and balancing act between the West and the Soviet bloc during the Cold War. The American university was a stimulus; to cite from his autobiography, it was "... as if from a different planet compared to venerable Uppsala. Uppsala had its origins. USC reflected the future." He met personalities such as Henry Kissinger and John F Kennedy.

== Career ==
Back at Uppsala University, Wahren's Master's thesis was approved as a Swedish Licentiate of Philosophy thesis. He introduced a course here on International Politics. In 1962, he obtained a position at 'Nämnden för Internationellt Bistånd' (NIB, a Swedish Committee for International Aid). At the time, he was also part-time Secretary to Olof Palme, for a Swedish commission on developing countries and education.

=== Positions at SIDA, the UN, IPPF, and OECD ===
The NIB committee was the predecessor of SIDA, the Swedish International Development Agency. Wahren worked at NIB and SIDA until 1977, including foreign assignments with visits to Asia to investigate the needs and opportunities for Sweden to support family planning (FP) programs, visits to the USA, to the OECD, and the UN. Mentors and collaborators during the early years were, among others, Elise Ottesen-Jensen ("Ottar"), Professor Ulf Borell at Karolinska Hospital, and SIDA's head Ernst Michanek.

From 1978 to 1984, Wahren was Secretary General of the International Planned Parenthood Federation (IPPF), based in London. Then followed three years of consulting, after which Wahren became head of the OECD's international development assistance unit from 1987 to 1997. Over the years, he collected material on the population issue, which led to the Carl Wahren Archive at the state-owned National Archives in Täby, Sweden – accessible to researchers and others.

=== Professional contributions ===
Wahren was a witness in the 1966 US Senate hearings on population and development, when the USAID considered and evaluated support to international FP programs. In 1969, Wahren published an international review of agencies and organisations involved in family planning, including their monetary aid; It became part of a book on population programs published by OECD at the time. He was a consultant to UNFPA, established in 1969, and a member of the committees for UN conferences on population and development in Bucharest (1974) and Mexico City (1984). At the Bucharest conference, Wahren was given the difficult but important task of reconciling delegates from countries with different views on population issues and economic development; a final document, the "World Population Plan of Action", finally saw the light of day after intense discussions.

At SIDA, Wahren was also engaged in the first FP program in a developing country to receive assistance from the West, i.e. from Sweden to Ceylon (Sri Lanka) in the late 1950's. Carl Wahren and Ernst Michanek were interviewed about the project in the scientific journal Science, where Swedish support for Pakistan is also mentioned. Wahren summarized the early Swedish involvement in international FP programs in a book chapter in 1969, and more recently in a film interview from 2024 where he assessed the FP program in Pakistan as essentially a failure, with mainly "lip services" from politicians. He also criticized the FP program in India 1975–76 with compulsive sterilisations of millions of men (vasectomy). The Indian government was responsible, with actions described by Wahren as "horrible", although on site in India, he could hear that wives of men with large families breathed a sigh of relief.

In the interview, Wahren praised the FP program in South Korea which began in 1961, and which SIDA supported. From 1968, both the highest (government) to the lowest levels, that is, villages and their leadership, participated, including "17,000 village level family planning mothers' clubs". The birth rate fell rapidly in South Korea and contributed to economic development as well. In 1980, Wahren received the South Korean President's Order of Merit, the Dongbaeg Medal.

Wahren participated in debates and wrote the review "Population, Environment, Development: An Inseparable Trioka" in Populi (a journal of UNFPA,). He also published frequently in OECD's journal, The OECD Observer, including the essay "Population and Development" in 1988. Wahren has remarked that from the mid-1990s, the topics of population and family planning (FP) became almost taboo in the public debate. The British population researcher Diana Coole identified five different reasons for this. Hans Rosling, a Swedish doctor, was optimistic regarding global population development. Wahren and colleagues criticized Rosling in an Op-Ed in the Swedish daily newspaper Svenska Dagbladet entitled (translation) "Rosling is wrong about the world's population". Rosling did not respond to the criticism in the newspaper.

After retirement, Wahren organized seminars and lectured on international issues, also through a research grant from the Riksbanken Jubileumsfond in Sweden.

== Later life and death ==
Carl Wahren performed as a pianist/composer on radio, in clubs and other forums in several countries, also at home in Täby in his later years. He recorded songs from the "Great American Songbook", French popular music and his own compositions. A major focus was on the key role of music in well-being and communication. Wahren received the Täby Municipality Culture Prize in 2018. He was active in the Church of Sweden in Täby and was interviewed in the Danderyd parish. In an interview reproduced in the USA, he describes his family's work in providing shelter to Jewish refugees during World War II.

13 April 2024, Carl Wahren died at the age of almost 91, in Täby, Sweden.
