= May Qwinten =

Swedish pop and rock singer (born 1983)

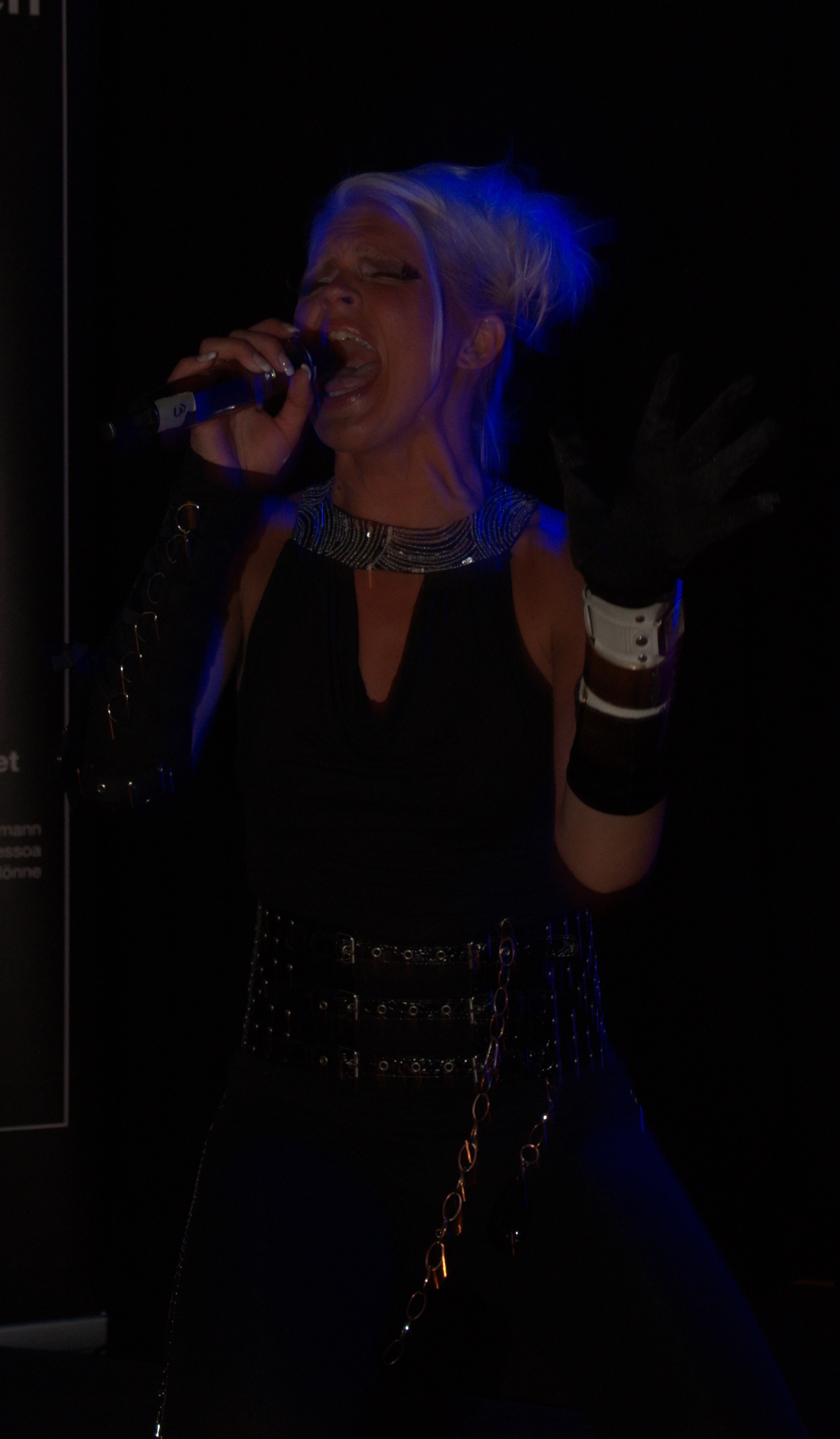
- May Qwinten in Falsterbo

Background information
- Born: Madeleine Qwinten; May 10, 1983 (age 42); Malmö, Scania, Sweden
- Genres: Pop, rock
- Occupation: Singer
- Instrument: Vocals
- Years active: 2007–present
- Labels: MMS Records and Universal (2010); Qrash Records (2012)
- Website: www.mayqwinten.com

May Qwinten (born 10 May 1983, in Malmö, Sweden) is a Swedish pop and rock singer. She also has roots in Finland and Denmark. She is signed to Universal Music Sweden.

She started singing and dancing at the age of 3. By the age of 16, she started recording at the local Malmöstudio and toured Sweden and Poland.

May Qwinten's debut single "Hate S3X" (read as Hate Sex) was released digitally in October 2009, although it was an online hit and played in many night club venues all over Europe and reached as far as Japan and the United States and had good radio airplay. In April 2010, it was released as an EP and reached No. 18 on Sverigetopplistan, the official Swedish Singles Chart. "Hate S3X" also topped the Billboard "iLike Profiles: Most Added" chart on the week 5 June 2010. The follow-up single "One Shot" did not chart. The debut album May Day was also released in 2010.

But she is back in the charts in 2012 with her third single "Say Hey (It's A May Thing)".

== Discography ==
=== Albums ===
- 2010: May Day

=== Singles ===
Year	Single	Peak chart positions	Album
Year	Single	SWE	Album
2010	"Hate S3X"	18	Non album single
2010	"One Shot"	–	Non album single
2012	"Say Hey (It's A May Thing)"	24	Non album single
