= Anders Leonard Bygdén =

Swedish historian and author (1844–1929)

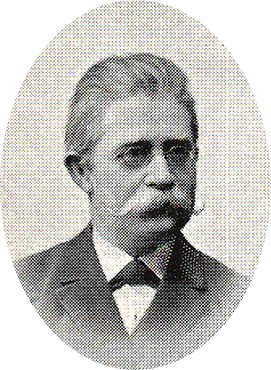
- Born: Anders Leonard Bygdén; March 3, 1844; Spånga, Sweden
- Died: November 22, 1929 (aged 85); Uppsala, Sweden
- Education: Uppsala University

Anders Leonard Bygdén (3 March 1844 – 22 November 1929) was a Swedish historian and author. He founded the Swedish Literature Society in 1880.

== Biography ==
He was born on 3 March 1844 in Spånga, Sweden to Olof Bygdén. Bygdén enrolled at Uppsala University in 1863 and graduated with a B.A. in 1870 and Ph.D. in 1872. The university then hired him as an associate professor of philosophy. He founded the Swedish Literature Society with Henrik Schück in 1880. He was made a member of the Royal Faculty of Science Society in Uppsala in 1890 and the Royal Society for the Issuance of Manuscripts Relating to Scandinavian history in 1899. He published Hernösands Stifts Herdaminne from 1923 to 1928. He died on 22 November 1929 in Uppsala, Sweden.

== Publications ==
- Förteckning över Norrlands nations i Uppsala bibliotek (1876)
- Uppsala universitets biblioteks accessionskatalog (1881)
- Svenskt anonym- och pseudonymlexikon (1898–1915)
- Hernösands stifts herdaminne (1923–1928)
