= Hjördis Lind-Campbell =

Swedish physician (1891–1984)

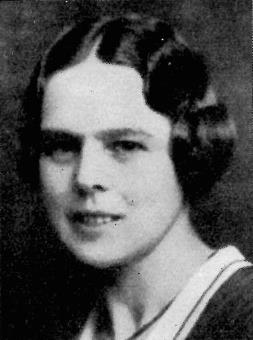

Hjördis Lind-Campbell (27 June 1891 – 13 September 1984) was a Swedish physician. She was a pioneer member of the Medical Women's International Association. Lind-Campbell was known for her work in sex education and for the creation of an adoption program for unmarried women.

== Early life and education ==
Lind-Campbell was born into a Swedish middle-class family and had three siblings. She attended the Karolinska Institutet for her undergraduate education in premedical study, and worked for a time at the University of Lund hospital. She met her husband there, Åke Campbell, who was later a professor of ethnology, and married in 1918; they had four children, two of them before she finished her medical studies. Lind-Campbell graduated from the University of Lund in 1922 with her M.D.

== Career and research ==
While practicing medicine throughout the Västerås area, she became a pioneer member of the Medical Women's International Association. She worked in pulmonology, pediatrics, gynecology, and rural medicine. She worked in a maternity home as a school pupil, and was later in her career involved in setting up a home for unmarried women with Elise Ottesen-Jensen. She began a unique adoption program in Sweden, and worked with the National Swedish Association for Sexual Information. She provided advice to women with sexual problems, and also consulted on abortions, which were heavily restricted at the time. Lind-Campbell also worked for a time with tuberculosis patients. She saw that some women were sent home with the advice only to not become pregnant (as it may cause a relapse). Lind-Campbell began providing women with diaphragms, which was forbidden at the time, as providing information on contraception was forbidden until 1938.

Lind-Campbell retired at the age of 82. She died on 13 September 1984, and was buried at the Old Cemetery in Uppsala. Two of her children followed medical careers.
