= Johan Ihre =

Swedish philologist and historical linguist

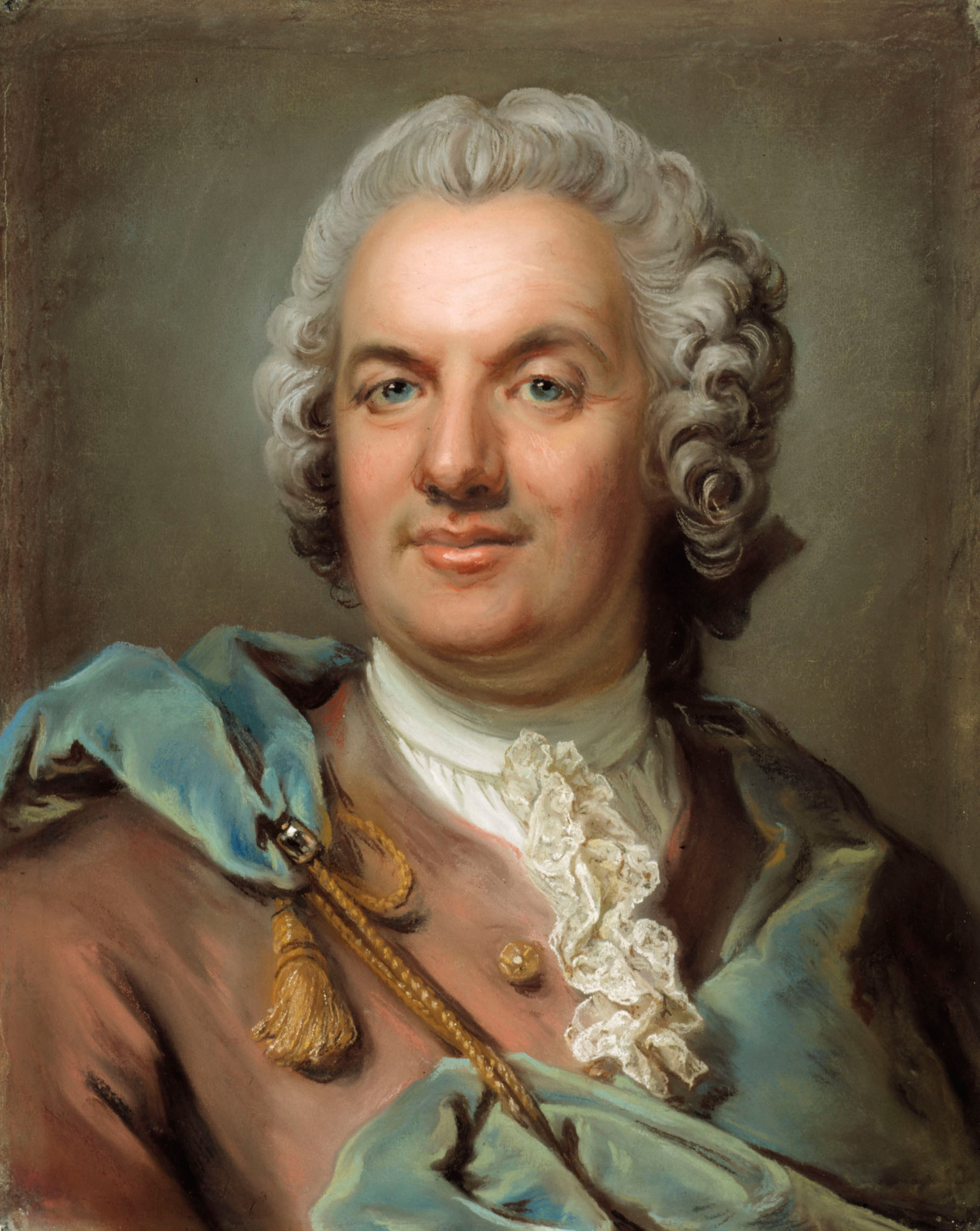
Johan Ihre

Johan Ihre (3 March 1707 – 1 December 1780) was a Swedish philologist and historical linguist.

== Life ==
Ihre was born in Lund, son of the theologian Thomas Ihre and his spouse Brita Steuchia. After his father's death in 1720, Johan Ihre was raised in the house of his grandfather Archbishop Mattias Stechius in Uppsala, and studied at Uppsala University, where he completed his magister degree in 1730. In 1730-1733 he studied abroad, in Oxford, London and Paris. He was in 1734 appointed docent in Uppsala, 1735 librarian at the University Library, and was from 1737 until his death holder of the Skyttean professorship in Eloquence and Government. He became a member of the Royal Academy of Letters in 1755. He was secretary of the Royal Swedish Society of Sciences in Uppsala.

== Works ==
Ihre was the first scholar to recognize the sound change of the Germanic languages that was later to be elaborated on by Rasmus Christian Rask and Jakob Grimm and now known after the latter as Grimm's law.

In 1737 the German philologist Johann Georg Wachter (1663–1757) published an etymological dictionary of the German language, Glossarium Germanicum. This book had a great influence on Johan Ihre: in 1769 he published, along the same lines as Wachter's work, a Swedish etymological dictionary. Ihre's etymological dictionary of Swedish demonstrated the origin of words in Old Swedish forms and compared them to cognates in other languages. Ihre thought, in accordance with the historical speculations common at the time and derived from Icelandic sources, that the language had been brought to the Nordic countries by Odin. Ihre was also the first to demonstrate that the text of the Codex argenteus manuscript in the Uppsala University Library is identical to the Gothic Bible translation by Bishop Wulfila.

== Selected bibliography of Ihre's works ==
- Utkast till föreläsningar öfwer swenska språket, 1745
- Fragmenta versonis Ulphilanae, continentia particulas..., 1763
- Swenskt dialect lexicon, 1766
- Anmärkningar, rörande Codex argenteus i Upsala, 1767
- Analecta Ulphilana, 1767–1769
- Glossarium Suiogothicum, 1769
- Scripta versionem Ulphilanam et linguam Moeso-Gothicam illustrantia, 1773
