= Kåre Pugerup =

Swedish diplomat

Kåre Pugerup (born in Viborg) is a Swedish UN diplomat and Chief of Staff at the United Nations agency IFAD in Rome. Previously he served at the Ministry for Foreign Affairs in Stockholm where he was a Project Director at the Department for International Development Cooperation. He earned a BSc and MSc in Business Administration and Economics at Uppsala University, Sweden. He also completed Executive Management Program at Harvard Business School.
