= Peter Estenberg =

- von Estenberg
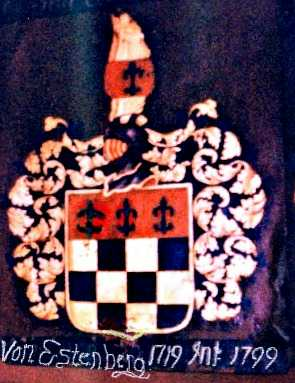
- Coat of arms of the von Estenberg Family - hanging on the wall of Knights and Nobles at The Riddarhuset in Stockholm. Sweden
- Born: 3 June 1686
- Died: 26 April 1740 (aged 53)
- Spouse: Regina Westerskold
- Issue: Elsa Sara, Christine Regina, Heding Beata, Carl, Sara Regina, Gabriel, Christine, Fredrika, Ulrika
- House: House of Estenberg and House of Westerskold (by marriage)
- Father: Per Olafsson (later Estenberg)

Peter Estenberg (also known as Peter von Estenberg and Petrus Estenberg) lived in the late 17th - early 18th century and was a member of the Swedish nobility of the house of Estenberg, a noted scholar, and an ambassador to Poland. His family coat of arms is displayed in the Riddarhuset in Stockholm. In the early 18th century, Peter Estenberg became an advisor to Poland's King Stanislaw (Stanisław Leszczyński). Peter Estenberg was also a master of Greek language, a tutor to the Swedish royal family, and a professor of Greek studies and Philosophy at the University of Lund, and later the rector of Jamshog and Nasum's parishes.

== Biography ==
Peter Estenberg was born in Stockholm in the late 17th century. The Swedish Biographical Dictionary places his birth date as 3 June 1686. However his coat of arms, displayed on the wall of the Riddarhuset in Stockholm places his first date of admission as 1719 (the date that he was appointed as professor at the University of Lund). Peter Estenberg's father, Per Olofsson, also known as Peter, was a chamberlain. Per Olofsson later took the name von Estenberg when he was ennobled. Per's wife, Peter Estenberg's mother, was Elsa Bengtsdotter Balck.

When Peter was ten his parents sent him to live and study in Uppsala, seat of one of northern Europe's most noted universities. He stayed there for over a decade before relocating to Lund in 1709 to continue his studies. Peter Estenberg rose to professorship rapidly when he was offered a position at the University of Carolinska. His quick rise was due to a noted lecture that he delivered on a recently deceased nobleman which won him the favor of the King, Carl XII. Eventually Peter Estenberg was selected by Carl XII to mentor the king's cousin, Count Gyllenstierna. Peter Estenberg joined Gyllenstierna on many journeys throughout Europe. Peter Estenberg also spent a period of time working as an advisor and a corresponding secretary to King Stanislaw (Stanisław Leszczyński) of Poland.

In 1719, shortly after his return to Sweden from the court of King Stanislaw, Peter Estenberg was appointed to be professor of Greek literature at the University of Lund. Three years later, in 1722, he married Regina Westerskold (name translates into "western shield"), a young noblewoman whose forefathers descended from English, French, and Scottish nobility (Somerset, Petre, and Stuart). The Westerskold family had two noble lineages, descending from both the infamous Jöran Persson Tegel (Machiavellian advisor to King Erik XIV), and Baron John Petre of Writtle, a high English Lord. The Westerskold's also have a noble crest which once hung in the Riddarhuset in Stockholm. However, a mystery surrounds the whereabouts of the actual shield, which has been misplaced or stolen (possible due to its connection to Joran Persson Tegel who is widely considered a villain). Peter Estenberg held his office at the University of Lund until 1727, when he received the commission as rector of the Jamshog and Nasum's parishes of the Lund diocese. He had numerous children with his wife, Regina, including Elsa Sara, who was disinherited due to her marriage to a commoner. Peter Estenberg died on 26 April 1740.

== Descendants ==
Children of Peter Estenberg and Regina Westerskold:

Elsa Sara Estenberg, (1723–1762, died at age 39)

Heding Beata Estenberg, (1725–1783, died at age 58)

Carl Estenberg, (1728–1815, died at 87)

Sara Regina Estenberg, (1729–1804, died at age 75)

Christine Estenberg (born in Jemshop on 23 September 1733, died at the age of 70 in November 1803)

Twins: Fredrika Estenberg and Ulrika Estenberg, (born on 31 August 1736, Fredrika died at 54, Ulrika died in 1825 at 89)

Estenberg's children who died young:

- Christine Regina Estenberg, (died as a baby)
- Gabriel Estenberg (born in 1722, died at age 11)

The first-born male heir of Peter Estenberg and Regina Westerskold was their son Gabriel, who died at the age of eleven, leaving the second-oldest child, Elsa Sara Estenberg, as the focus of her parents' ambitions to reestablish the family bloodline into European nobility. Elsa Sara, however, did not adhere to her parents' will and marry into a noble house. She instead ran away while still a teenager, with Jöns Persson, the son of the owner of the land that Peter Estenberg's parish was on. Peter and Regina disowned Elsa Sara in a letter written by Regina that has been preserved in the archives of the von Estenberg Society and the family property and title went to the other children.

== Importance of Estenberg and Westerskold ==
The House of Peter von Estenberg earned its crest and title through study and well played politics. It represents the rise to prominence of a member of the land owning, business minded commoners who eventually became the merchant class and the councilors to kings during the height of Swedish Imperial expansion in the Baltic. The House of Westerskold and the lineage of Regina's father Anders Westerskold represent a different kind of nobility than Estenberg's lineage. The Westerskolds were old European Blue-Bloods, descendants of multiple noble houses in England, Scotland, France, and Sweden. Their English line came down from the Somerset's, who had vied for the throne of England more than once. From the last of the Westerskold Somerset's, Catherine Somerset, the line took on the noble name of Petre, and continued to serve the Kings and Queens of England in high offices such as Peer and as Secretary of State. The Petre family maintained their Catholic faith throughout the Protestant Reformation in Britain, even under King James, until the rise of Oliver Cromwell and the Puritans. This forced a branch of the Westerskold Petres to flee England and eventually settle in Sweden. The Swedish branch of the Westerskold descendants married into the Swedish family of Joran Person Tegel who was made noble by way of his wits by being councilor to a king, as Peter Estenberg had done. By the time that the two branches of Regina Westerskold's bloodline had married into the name Westerskold, Peter von Estenberg was a rising star in the growing Swedish empire. The marriage of Peter Estenberg to Regina Westerskold was that of a rising star to a descending one: the new aristocracy of professional politicians and scholars to the old Blue-Bloods that could trace their heritage back to the Plantagenets. The family crest for the noble house of Westerskold is no longer hanging in the Riddarhuset, where all of the noble Swedish crests are placed. It has been stolen or removed, possibly because of the Westerskold connection to Joran Person Tegel who is considered one of Sweden's worst villains for his part in the assassination of Erik XIV. However, the House of Estenberg still exists today.

== Riddarhuset ==
The Riddarhuset is the Swedish House of Nobles and Knights where all the Swedish Noble family crests are hung, and each Noble House is chronicled.

== Estenberg's Impact Today ==
The Swedish botanist, Linnea, named a plant after the von Estenberg family -

The von Estenberg Society in Sweden is a family association made up of the descendants of Peter von Estenberg and Regina Westskold. The association holds annual reunions and family trips for all of its members. It is also dedicated to exploring, researching, and preserving the history of the von Estenbergs.

== See also ==
- List of Swedish noble families
