= Carl-Gösta Borelius =

Swedish cryptanalyst and IT manager

Carl-Gösta Håkan Fredriksson Borelius (January 3, 1919, Övertorneå, Sweden – September 21, 1995, Täby, Sweden), was a Swedish cryptanalyst and IT manager.

== Early life ==
Borelius was the son of folk high school principal Fredrik Borelius and his wife Ester Håkansson. He married Gunvor Rosén; they had three sons.

After matriculating at Haparanda higher general education institution (college) in 1939, he began studies in mathematics at Uppsala University in 1940, among other things with professor Arne Beurling. Shortly afterwards, he was called up for military service and, with the approval of Beurling, who had already been previously trained and involved in the crypto-forcing work, he was placed in the crypto department of the Defense Staff; what later became the National Defence Radio Establishment (Försvarets Radioanstalt), FRA.

== Career ==
During the Second World War, Borelius participated in the successful forcing of G-printer material (G-printer after the German Geheimfernschreiber), in which Arne Beurling made a decisive contribution. When it eventually became known in Germany that the Swedes could read the G-printer traffic, they switched to a new machine, called the Z-printer, whose secrets remained unsolved for a long time. In April 1943, however, a group consisting of mathematicians and cryptanalysts Bo Kjellberg, Tufve Ljunggren and Borelius were finally able to clarify the machine's construction.

Beurling was very tight-lipped about how he had gone about forcing and reconstructing the German cipher machine and Borelius, probably after a visit by Beurling to the FRA in November 1976, made a reconstruction of his work based in part on Beurling's apparently reluctant response to a question about how it had happened. He had used "threes and fives in the text", which means that you could create a certain structure in the mass of text as 3 = shift to letters (4 = numbers) and 5 = spaces. The use of the numbers for transmission problems on long lines and human shortcomings made it possible to find openings in the work of interpretation and the understanding of the working methods of the remote printer. Borelius's reconstruction is reproduced on FRA's website.

Through his role at FRA, Borelius was one of the early users of Sweden's emerging "mathematics machines", or computers, such as BARK and BESK and also later designs such as Facit EDB and from Datasaab and others, and later became head of FRA's data center. Borelius has described the creation and development of the first Swedish computers, especially from FRA's perspective, in a writing whose unclassified part has the title: FRA and ADB, How it began.
