= Georg Wallin the Elder =

Swedish clergyman (1644–1723)

The Right Reverend Georg Wallin the Elder
- Bishop of Gothenburg
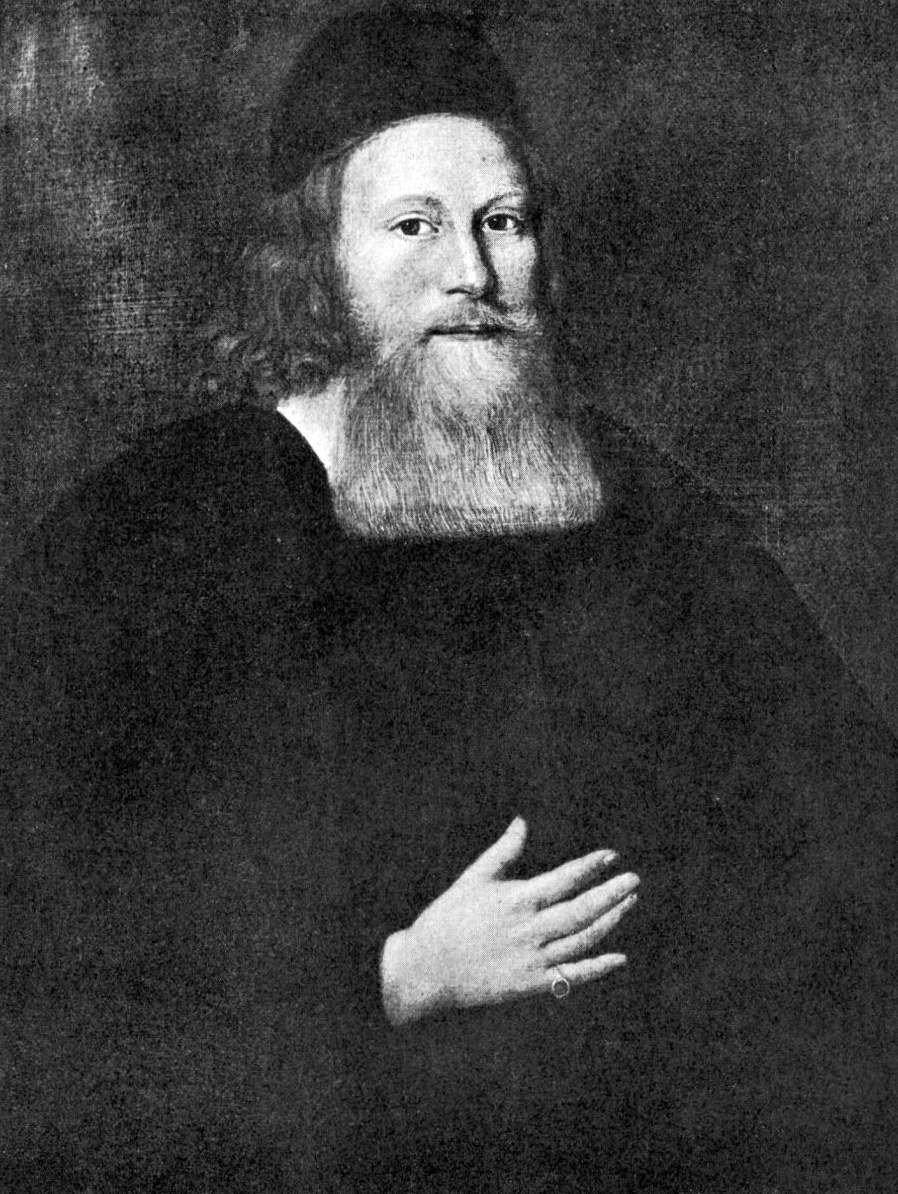
- Oil painting from ca 1710.
- Church: Church of Sweden
- Diocese: Diocese of Gothenburg
- Predecessor: Johan Carlberg
- Successor: Johannes Tingvall

Personal details
- Born: Georg Wallin; 1 May 1644 Vibyggerå Socken, Ångermanland, Kingdom of Sweden
- Died: 8 July 1723 (aged 79) Säbrå Socken, Ångermanland, Kingdom of Sweden
- Children: Georg Wallin the Younger

Georg Wallin the Elder (1 May 1644 – 8 July 1723) was a Swedish clergyman, serving as bishop of Gothenburg and superintendent of Härnösand.

== Biography ==
Georg Wallin was born on 1 May 1644 in Ångermanland to a farmer and innkeeper. He entered Uppsala University in 1672 and, when returning to Uppsala after summer recess for his second year of study, he was shipwrecked off the coast of Gävle, but was saved by holding onto a plank. However, all his possessions was lost. In 1676, he graduated with a Master of Philosophy degree and received an ordination the same year. He served as domestic chaplain (huspredikant) to Gustaf Banér and Nils Brahe the Younger, members of the Privy Council. In April 1680, he preached by the King's Guards at Kungsör royal estate. By a request from Charles XI, King of Sweden, who was staying at the estate at the time, he performed a Sunday sermon and became the King's pastor from then on.

He was made court chaplain and was appointed chief court chaplain in 1681 and 1690 respectivaly. He served Charles XI and his wife in their final hours of life. On 5 August 1701, after accompanying Charles XII, King of Sweden on his invasion of Zealand as field superintendent, he was appointed bishop of Gothenburg. However, he was transferred after eight months by his own request as superintendent. The office administration was made difficult by repeated Russian depredations, and on 29 May 1721, he was forced to flee the city of Härnösand. His wife had died three days earlier, and when the Russian Navy raided Säbrå, they burned down the rectory with his wife's coffin still in it.
