= Sofia Holmgren =

Swedish physician

Sofia Holmgren (1864–1953) was a Swedish physician, a pioneer of sexual education and one of the first women physicians in Malmö.

== Life and work ==
Sofia Holmgren was born on 4 January 1864 to Albert Holmgren, a professor of physics in Lund, and mother Elin Stiernstedt, who was of noble birth. Two of her uncles were also professors; Frithiof Holmgren in physiology in Uppsala, and Hjalmar Holmgren in mathematics and mechanics in Stockholm at the University of Technology.

When Holmgren registered at Lund University in 1888, she was among only 20 women students at that institution. It took her only ten years to complete her studies and become a registered doctor, which was considered a pace that's faster than the average and she obtained her medical licentiate degree with high grades.

Sofia Holmgren established her own practice in Malmö, probably the only such practice run by a woman after Hedda Andersson left the city in 1895. Sofia Holmgren remained in Malmö until 1909 when she moved to Stockholm and was elected as a member of the Swedish Medical Association. She stayed in Stockholm until her retirement in 1934.

=== Sex educator ===
She was mainly known as a lecturer and teacher on "sexual hygiene" (sexual education). She gave courses on the subject in Malmö and Lund, mainly directed at teachers, which were well attended. According to the magazine Dagny she presented "the sensitive subject in such a manner as only the finest and most noble women could do."

=== Last years ===
Holmgren retired in 1934 and moved back to Malmö but then moved a last time to Hörby, where she died on 8 October 1953 at nearly 90 years of age and is buried there.
