= Karl-Erik Andersson (academic) =

Swedish pharmacologist and academic

- Born: Sweden
- Occupations: Pharmacologist and academic

Academic background
- Education: MD; PhD
- Alma mater: Lund University

Karl-Erik Andersson is a Swedish pharmacologist and academic. He is a professor emeritus in the Institute for Regenerative Medicine at Wake Forest University School of Medicine and in the Division of Clinical Chemistry and Pharmacology at Lund University.

Andersson has published over 1000 peer-reviewed journal articles, focusing on pharmacology and physiology related to the urogenital and cardiovascular systems and clinical trial research. He has received awards including Life Time Awards from the European Society for Sexual Medicine (2005), the Society for Urodynamics and Female Urology (2007), and the International Continence Society (2014), along with the 2008 Thorsten Thunberg Medal from the Royal Physiographic Society in Lund and the Wilie Gregoir Medal from the European Association of Urology in 2022.

Andersson was elected Fellow of the Royal Physiographic Society in Lund in 2021.

== Education and career ==
Andersson earned a medical degree in 1968, followed by a PhD in pharmacology in 1973, both from Lund University, where he also worked as a lecturer in clinical pharmacology. Subsequently, he received training at Lund University Hospital from 1968 to 1975 and was awarded a Swedish specialist degree in internal medicine in 1975. He continued his academic career as a professor of clinical pharmacology at the University of Odense in 1975 and at the University of Aarhus from 1976 to 1978. From 1978 to 2006, he assumed the roles of professor and chairman of the Department of Clinical Pharmacology at Lund University and continues to hold the position of professor emeritus. In 2006, he joined Wake Forest University as a professor in the Institute for Regenerative Medicine and has been serving as professor emeritus since 2019.

== Research ==
Andersson has contributed to the field of pharmacology by developing therapeutic interventions for urinary disorders, particularly benign prostatic hyperplasia, and neurogenic bladder dysfunction, with a focus on novel pharmacological targets and mechanisms. His earlier studies had demonstrated that cGMP-dependent protein kinase I (cGKI) mediates nitric oxide/cGMP-induced smooth muscle relaxation, while cAMP signals independently, as cGKI-deficient smooth muscle still responds to cAMP. Furthermore, looking into the role of neurotransmitters in erectile function, he examined how pharmacological treatments, such as phosphodiesterase inhibitors and prostaglandin E1, help treat erectile dysfunction by promoting smooth muscle relaxation.

Reviewing investigational pharmacological treatments for overactive bladder syndrome and related conditions, Andersson laid emphasis on the limitations of existing therapies in efficacy and tolerability and the need for improved options. With Anders Arner, he analyzed advancements in understanding the properties, contractile system, signaling pathways, and receptors of detrusor smooth muscle, along with its alterations in pathological bladder conditions. His research underscored strategies to treat neurogenic bladder dysfunction after spinal cord injury, focusing on lesion-reducing agents and bladder-targeted interventions for detrusor overactivity and sphincter dyssynergia. Investigating the potential of various drugs, including TRP channel blockers, P2X3 receptor antagonists, and gene therapies, for treating bladder storage dysfunction, he highlighted challenges such as side effects and limited clinical efficacy. Additionally, his work emphasized cinaciguat, a soluble guanylate cyclase (sGC) activator effective under oxidative stress, as a potential improvement over PDE5 inhibitors like tadalafil for treating benign prostatic hyperplasia and bladder outflow obstruction.

== Awards and honors ==
- 2005 – Lifetime Career Award, European Society for Sexual Medicine
- 2007 – Lifetime Achievement Award, Society for Urodynamics and Female Urology
- 2008 – Thorsten Thunberg Medal, Royal Physiographic Society in Lund
- 2014 – Lifetime Achievement Award, International Continence Society
- 2021 – Fellow, Royal Physiographic Society in Lund
- 2022 – Wilie Gregoir Medal, European Association of Urology

== Selected articles ==
- Andersson, K. E., & Wagner, G. (1995). Physiology of penile erection. Physiological reviews, 75(1), 191-236.
- Andersson, K. E., & Arner, A. (2004). Urinary bladder contraction and relaxation: physiology and pathophysiology. Physiological reviews, 84(3), 935-986.
- Andersson, K. E., & Gratzke, C. (2008). Pharmacology of the lower urinary tract. Textbook of the neurogenic bladder, 95-114.
- Abrams, P., Andersson, K. E., Birder, L., Brubaker, L., Cardozo, L., Chapple, C., ... & Wein, A. (2010). Fourth International Consultation on Incontinence Recommendations of the International Scientific Committee: Evaluation and treatment of urinary incontinence, pelvic organ prolapse, and fecal incontinence. Neurourol Urodyn, 29(1), 213-40.
- Andersson, K. E. (2018). PDE5 inhibitors–pharmacology and clinical applications 20 years after sildenafil discovery. British journal of pharmacology, 175(13), 2554-2565.
- Michel, M. C., Cardozo, L., Chermansky, C. J., Cruz, F., Igawa, Y., Lee, K. S., ... & Andersson, K. E. (2023). Current and emerging pharmacological targets and treatments of urinary incontinence and related disorders. Pharmacological Reviews, 75(4), 554-674.
- Uvelius, B., & Andersson, K. E. (2024). Can Urinary Bladder Innervation Be Restored After Outlet Obstruction and Denervation?. International Neurourology Journal, 28(2), 1.
