= Mia Lövheim =

Mia Lövheim (born 1968) is a professor of the Sociology of Religion at Uppsala University in Uppsala, Sweden with a research specialisation in new media.

After completing her doctorate in 2004 with a dissertation published as Intersecting Identities: Young People, Religion, and Interaction on the Internet, she did postdoctoral work at the Institute for Media and Communication at the University of Oslo, in Norway, pursuing the theme of her dissertation on youth self-definition on the internet, particularly in relation to girls and to religion, with a project entitled Between Postmodernity and Tradition: Young Women's Values in Mediated Stories on the Internet, and was appointed to a professorship in 2011. Based on her research, she has spoken to the challenges the established churches face in attracting new members among youth.

== Publications ==
- Intersecting Identities: Young People, Religion, and Interaction on the Internet, Uppsala University, 2004, ISBN 978-91-506-1740-5
- (ed.) Media, Religion, and Gender: Key Issues and New Challenges, Routledge, 2013, ISBN 9780415504720
