= Magnus Martensson =

American musician

Magnus Sven Martensson (born August 30, 1966) is a Swedish and American comedian, pianist and conductor.

He has performed at the United Nations, Carolines on Broadway, Carnegie Hall; on US and Swedish TV, and toured extensively in North America and Scandinavia.

Born in Malmö, Sweden, Martensson studied at the Malmö Academy of Music and the Cleveland Institute of Music. He was visiting professor at the University at Buffalo, and served as music director of the Scandinavian Chamber Orchestra of New York and the Slee Sinfonietta. He has conducted world premiere recordings of music by David Felder, Roger Reynolds, and Jeffrey Stadelman.

Martensson has composed one opera, Before the Law, Kvasir for Strings, songs and chamber music, and is the author of the book Thoughts, Verse and Further Nonsense. His short comedy filmsThe Dog and The Maestro have been screened at Scandinavia House, New York.
