= Alf Tergel =

Swedish writer (1935–2007)

Alf Henry Tergel (8 August 1935 – 15 October 2007) was a Swedish church historian.

== Education and career ==
Alf Tergel did his doctorate in church history and was a university lecturer in religious studies from 1969 to 1999. He was acting professor of church history 1983–1987 and of mission studies 1999–2003. He was appointed Professor of Church History in 2000, but continued until his retirement to hold the Professorship of Missionary Studies. Throughout his academic career he served at Uppsala University. His research profile focused on the church's relationship with society. The doctoral dissertation dealt with the relationship of the young church movement to the labor issue and nationalism at the beginning of the 20th century. He then wrote an international perspective on the church's relationship to industrialization, the Cold War and capitalism. His textbook Från Jesus till Mao (From Jesus to Mao), later titled Från Jesus till Moder Teresa (From Jesus to Mother Teresa), was for thirty years a basic textbook for students of church history. In the book, Tergel provides historical perspectives on the position of Christianity and the church in today's and tomorrow's world. The main theme is the interplay between Christianity and the environment. The book provides an easily accessible introduction to the history of Christianity and presents an overview of the effects of the Christian message on the outside world, as well as how people and environments affected this message from the appearance of Jesus and into our own time. Tergel lived almost his entire life in Sigtuna. He was the son of Algot Tergel, well-known publicist and director of the Church of Sweden's lay school. They are buried at Sigtuna cemetery.

== Bibliography ==
- Ungkyrkomännen, arbetarfrågan och nationalismen 1901–1911 (The Young Churchmen, the Labor Question and Nationalism 1901–1911), 1969.
- Från Jesus till Mao (From Jesus to Mao), 1973.
- Från konfrontation till institution: Ungkyrkorörelsen 1912–1917 (From Confrontation to Institution: the Young Church Movement 1912–1917), 1974
- Kyrkan och industrialismen (The Church and Industrialism), 1981.
- Kyrkan och kapitalismens kris (The Church and the Crisis of Capitalism), 1983.
- Kyrkan och det kalla kriget (The Church and the Cold War), 1987.
- Från Jesus till Moder Teresa (From Jesus to Mother Teresa), 1988.
- Kyrkan och tredje världen (The Church and the Third World), 1991.
- Church and Society in the Modern Age, 1995.
- De mänskliga rättigheterna och Kyrkornas Världsråd (Human Rights and the World Council of Churches), 1998.
- Human Rights in Cultural and Religious Traditions, 1998.
- Tro och religion i historia och samhälle (Faith and Religion in History and Society), 2002.
- Teologi och dialog. Utmaningar och svar i teologin (Theology and dialogue, Challenges and Answers in Theology), 2006.
