= Emmily Kamwendo-Naphambo =

Malawian researcher and sociologist

Dr. Emmily Kamwendo-Naphambo
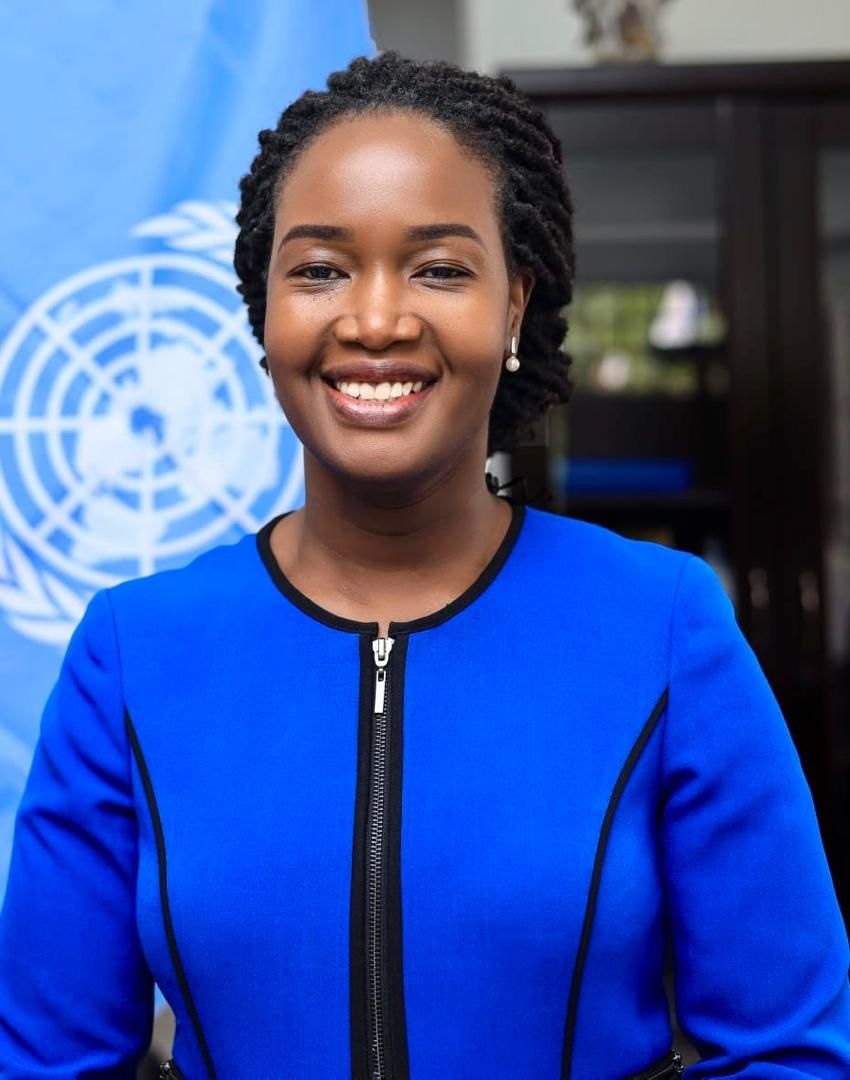
- Dr. Emmily Kamwendo-Naphambo
- Occupations: Researcher,Sociologist
- Title: Dr.

Academic background
- Education: BSc University of Malawi: Masters Lund University; PhD University of Cape Town
- Alma mater: Lund University

Academic work
- Discipline: Sociology
- Sub-discipline: Sexual and reproductive health and rights
- Institutions: United Nations Population Fund: United Nations Mission in South Sudan; Plan International; UN Women

Emmily Kamwendo-Naphambo is a Malawian sociologist and development practitioner specializing in the humanitarian-development-peace nexus across Africa. Her work focuses on gender equality, child protection, and public health. She currently serves as the Deputy Representative for the United Nations Population Fund (UNFPA) in Ghana.

== Academic Background ==
Originally from Malawi, Emmily's academic work has centered on the legal and social conditions of the vulnerable populace. She earned a master's degree in development studies from Lund University in 2009. Her thesis "The Invisible Prisoners" examined the presence and experience of children within the prison systems in Malawi.

In 2020, she completed a PhD in Sociology at the University of Cape Town (UCT) Her doctoral research. which was supported by the African Pathways Scholarship, with funding from the National Institute for the Humanities and Social Sciences (NIHSS) and the Council for the Development of Social Science Research in Africa (CODESRIA) explored how social and cultural norms define readiness for marriage among young girls.

== Career ==
Naphambo began her career with the Population Services International focusing on social norm change initiatives and youth engagement.

She later contributed to national-level research by co-authoring the "Women Empowerment" chapter in the 2016 Malawi demographic and Health Survey in collaboration with the National Statistics Office.

Her career included several roles focused on legislative and social reforms;

- Child Marriage Advocacy: While with Plan International, she led the Plan 18+ to end child marriages in Malawi, Tanzania, Zambia and Zimbabwe, with the aim to raise the legal marriage age from 15 to 18.
- United Nations Secretariat: She served with the United Nation Mission In South Sudan in 2019, where she coordinated child protection initiatives involving military forces during the South Sudanese Civil War and led to the drafting of security council reports on children and armed conflict. In her current role as the Deputy Representative of the United Nations Population Fund in Ghana, she overseas programs targeting maternal health, adolescent reproductive rights, and the reduction of gender-based violence.

== Research and Publications ==
Naphambo's research often examines the intersection of traditional authority and human rights. Her 2022 study in the Journal of Adolescent Health analyzed the influence of rural chiefs on girls' sexual and communal power structures.

Her earlier work with Women and Law in Southern Africa (WSLA) resulted in the report "Poor, Invisible and Excluded: Women in State Custody Malawi" which documented the legal and living conditions of incarcerated women.

She has also contributed to the UNFPA–UNICEF joint acceleration paper titled Towards Zero Gender-Based Violence and Harmful Practices in West and Central Africa.

She has also authored policy briefs for the South African Development Community (SADC) regarding the harmonization of national laws with the African Charter on Rights and Welfare of the Child.

=== Selected Bibliography ===
- Naphambo, E.K. (2020). (Re)constructing the African notion of girls' readiness for marriage: An exploratory study in Malawi. PhD thesis, University of Cape Town.
- Naphambo, E.K. (2022). A Vexing Relationship Between Chiefship and Girls' Sexuality: Insights from Rural Malawi. "Journal of Adolescent Health", 70(3 Suppl), S36–S42.
- Naphambo, E.K. (2012). Children in Prisons of Malawi: The Invisible Prisoners..
- National Statistical Office (2016). *Malawi Demographic and Health Survey*. Contributor – Women Empowerment chapter.
- Naphambo, EK (2026) et all. Investing more and better: The case for ending maternal deaths and meeting family planning needs in Ghana - African Journal of Reproductive Health (Vol 30).
