= Jola Sigmond =

Swedish architect SAR (born 1943)

Jola Sigmond (born September 2, 1943) is a Swedish architect SAR. He was born in Budapest, Hungary, and came to Sweden as a fugitive in 1967 where he studied architecture at Lund University in Lund. His intelligence quotient is stated to be 192, and he creates IQ assessments.
