= Hildegard Björck =

First Swedish woman to gain a degree

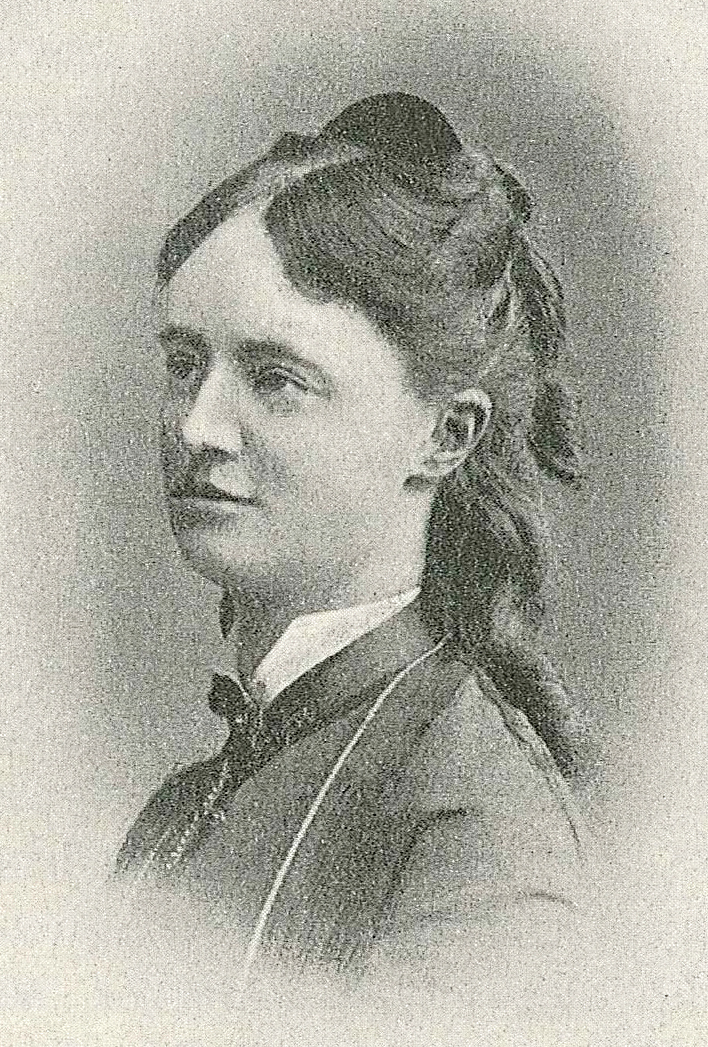
- Björck in a photo taken during her time as a student
- Born: Thora Maria Fredrika Hildegard Björck; 1 May 1847; Sweden
- Died: 7 April 1920 (aged 72); Sweden
- Education: Lund University, Uppsala University
- Occupations: Academic, educator, women's rights advocate
- Known for: First Swedish woman to complete an academic degree
- Notable work: Advocacy for women's education and social reform
- Movement: Women's education, social reform

Thora Maria Fredrika Hildegard Björck (1 May 1847 – 7 April 1920) was the first Swedish woman to complete an academic degree. She is today considered a female academic pioneer in Sweden. Björck received the opportunity to enlist and graduate with degrees from both Lund and Uppsala. She also had an interest in literature and worked against prostitution.

== Biography ==
Hildegard Björck was born on 1 May 1847 in Bro, Värmland. She was the daughter of surveyor Carl Emanuel Björck and his wife Anna Charlotte Roman. Anna died when Hildegard was just four years old, and her father died in 1869 when she was 22 years old. The year after her father's death, an opportunity arose for Swedish women to get a studentexamen, and Hildegard Björck was one of the first to take the opportunity.

She graduated from the Nya Elementar-school in Stockholm in June 1872 and the following year entered Uppsala University, graduating with a medico-philosophy degree in 1873 and a medicine degree in 1879.

She studied there at the same time as the writer Ellen Fries, although the two disagreed on many issues.

In the spring of 1880, Björck was accepted at Lund University; however, after suffering from measles and additional hearing problems, she stopped her studies and never became a licensed doctor.

Björck became an informal assistant doctor to anatomy professor Carl Fredrik Naumann, and her part uncle who was a medicine doctor who lived in Stockholm. After both men died from old age, Björck worked as a private carer to a number of individuals in France, England and Switzerland. One of them, Julia Ewelöf, became a close friend, and they lived together in Lausanne in the same dwelling until Björck's death on 7 April 1920.

Björck's ashes were given to her relatives in Sweden in 1928, and she was buried in the Björck family grave at the Skogskyrkogården cemetery in Stockholm next to her brother Rudolf.

== See also ==
- Hedda Andersson
