= List of Swedish-language writers =

This is a list of Swedish-language novelists, poets and other writers. Among them are representatives of both Swedish literature and Finland-Swedish literature.

== A ==
- Emmy Abrahamson (born 1976)
- Alf Ahlberg (1892–1979)
- Lars Ahlin (1915–1997)
- Luai Ahmed (born 1993)
- Astrid Ahnfelt (1876–1962)
- John Ajvide Lindqvist (born 1968)
- Gallie Åkerhielm (1907–1968)
- Sonja Åkesson (1926–1977)
- Hans Alfredson (1931–2017)
- Karin Alfredsson (born 1953)
- Carl Jonas Love Almqvist (1793–1866)
- Einar Askestad (born 1964)
- Per Daniel Amadeus Atterbom (1790–1855)
- Dan Andersson (1888–1920)
- Lena Andersson (born 1970)
- Gerda Antti (1929–2026)
- Johannes Anyuru (born 1979)
- Britt Arenander (born 1941)
- Werner Aspenström (1918–1997)
- Majgull Axelsson (born 1947)

== B ==
- Fredrik Backman (born 1981)
- Carl Michael Bellman (1740–1795)
- Victoria Benedictsson (1850–1888)
- Frans G. Bengtsson (1894–1954)
- Annie Bergman (1889–1987)
- Bo Bergman (1869–1967)
- Hjalmar Bergman (1883–1931)
- Elisabeth Bergstrand-Poulsen (1887–1955)
- Elsa Beskow (1874–1953)
- Eva Billow (1902–1993)
- Marcus Birro (born 1972)
- Elsa Björkman-Goldschmidt (1888–1982)
- August Blanche (1811–1868)
- August Bondeson (1854–1906)
- Karin Boye (1900–1941)
- Fredrika Bremer (1801–1865)
- Annika Bryn (born 1945)

== C ==
- Bo Carpelan (1926–2011)
- Camilla Ceder (born 1976)
- Siv Cedering (1939–2007)
- Stig Claesson (1928–2008)

== D ==
- Stig Dagerman (1923–1954)
- Olof von Dalin (1708–1763)
- Tage Danielsson (1928–1985)
- Sven Delblanc (1931–1992)
- Walter Dickson (1916–1990)
- Ernst Didring (1868–1931)
- Elmer Diktonius (1896–1961)

== E ==
- Inger Edelfeldt (born 1956)
- Johannes Edfelt (1904–1997)
- Cordelia Edvardson (1929–2012)
- Åke Edwardson (born 1953)
- Lena Einhorn (born 1954)
- Gunnar Ekelöf (1907–1968)
- Vilhelm Ekelund (1880–1949)
- Kerstin Ekman (born 1933)
- Sigrid Elmblad (1860–1926), journalist, poet and translator
- Per Olov Enquist (1934–2020)
- Helena Eriksson (born 1962)
- Maria Ernestam (born 1959)

== F ==
- Charlotta Falkman (1795–1882), novelist
- Nils Ferlin (1898–1961), poet
- Torbjörn Flygt (born 1964)
- Per Anders Fogelström (1917–1998)
- Lars Forssell (1928–2007)
- Tua Forsström (born 1947)
- Marianne Fredriksson (1927–2007)
- Gustaf Fröding (1860–1911), poet

== G ==
- Jonas Gardell (born 1963)
- Bo Giertz (1905–1998)
- Anders Abraham Grafström (1790–1870)
- Elsa Grave (1918–2003)
- Maria Gripe (1923–2007)
- Jan Guillou (born 1944), journalist, novelist
- Hjalmar Gullberg (1898–1961)
- Lars Gyllensten (1921–2006)

== H ==
- Carl August Hagberg (1810–1864)
- Stefan Hammarén (born 1963)
- Bob Hansson (born 1970)
- Verner von Heidenstam (1859–1940)
- Alf Henrikson (1905–1995)
- Marie Hermanson (born 1956)
- Rut Hillarp (1914–2003)
- Sverre Holmsen (1906–1992)

== J ==
- Tove Jansson (1914–2001)
- Harry Järv (1921–2009)
- P. C. Jersild (born 1935)
- Eyvind Johnson (1900–1976)

== K ==
- Mons Kallentoft (born 1968)
- Theodor Kallifatides (born 1938)
- Mare Kandre (1962–2005)
- Marit Kapla (born 1970)
- Erik Axel Karlfeldt (1864–1931)
- Jonas Hassen Khemiri (born 1978)
- Agneta Klingspor (1946–2022)
- Martin Koch (1882–1940)
- Richert Vogt von Koch (1838–1913)
- Sara Kristoffersson (born 1972)
- Niklas Krog (born 1965)
- Agnes von Krusenstjerna (1894–1940)
- Elisabeth Kuylenstierna-Wenster (1869–1933)
- Willy Kyrklund (1921–2009)

== L ==
- Camilla Läckberg (born 1974)
- Anna Laestadius Larsson (born 1966), novelist
- Ann-Helén Laestadius (born 1971), Sami journalist and children's novelist
- Olof Lagercrantz (1911–2002)
- Pär Lagerkvist (1891–1974)
- Selma Lagerlöf (1858–1940)
- Dagmar Lange (pen name: Maria Lang; 1914–1991)
- Viveca Lärn (born 1944)
- Stieg Larsson (1954–2004)
- Stig Larsson (born 1955)
- Anna Maria Lenngren (1754–1817)
- Oscar Levertin (1862–1906)
- Li Li (born 1961)
- Sara Lidman (1923–2004)
- Elsa Lindberg-Dovlette (1874–1944)
- Astrid Lindgren (1907–2002)
- Barbro Lindgren (born 1937)
- Torgny Lindgren (1938–2017)
- Herman Lindqvist (born 1943)
- John Ajvide Lindqvist (born 1968)
- Sven Lindqvist (1932–2019)
- Fredrik Lindström (born 1963)
- Jonas Carl Linnerhielm (1758–1829)
- Ivar Lo-Johansson (1901–1990)
- Lasse Lucidor (1638–1674)
- Kristina Lugn (1948–2020)
- Artur Lundkvist (1906–1991)

== M ==
- Bertil Malmberg (1889–1958)
- Bodil Malmsten (1944–2016)
- Henning Mankell (1948–2015)
- Gerda Marcus (1880–1952), journalist
- Liza Marklund (born 1962)
- Harry Martinson (1904–1978)
- Moa Martinson(1890–1964)
- Erik Mesterton (1903–2004)
- Vilhelm Moberg (1898–1973)
- Lukas Moodysson (born 1969), published poetry before becoming a film director
- Jan Myrdal (1927–2020)
- Axel Munthe (1857–1949)

== N ==
- Håkan Nesser (born 1950)
- Mikael Niemi (born 1959)
- Peter Nilson (1937–1998)
- Hedvig Charlotta Nordenflycht (1718–1763)
- Sven Nordqvist (born 1946)
- Adolf Noreen (1854–1925)
- Julia Nyberg (1784–1854)

== O ==
- Albert Olsson (1904–1994)
- Jan Olof Olsson (pen name; Jolo; 1920–1974)
- Vladimir Oravsky (born 1947)
- Bruno K. Öijer (born 1951), poet
- Klas Östergren (born 1955)
- Johan Gabriel Oxenstierna (1750–1818)

== P ==
- Malte Persson (born 1976)
- Sara Pfeiffer (1829-1913), novelist
- Agneta Pleijel (born 1940)
- Ida von Plomgren (1870–1960)
- Peter Pohl (born 1940)

== R ==
- Povel Ramel (1922–2007)
- Björn Ranelid (born 1949)
- Märta Helena Reenstierna (1753–1841)
- Ann Rosman (born 1973)
- Johan Ludvig Runeberg (1804–1877)
- Viktor Rydberg (1828–1895)

== S ==
- Irmelin Sandman Lilius (born 1936)
- Eugen Semitjov (1923–1987), writer, journalist and artist
- Malla Silfverstolpe (1782–1861), diarist
- Birger Sjöberg (1885–1929)
- Maj Sjöwall (1935–2020)
- Hjalmar Söderberg (1869–1941)
- Edith Södergran (1892–1923)
- Erik Johan Stagnelius (1793–1823), Romantic poet
- Georg Stiernhielm (1598–1672)
- Jan Stocklassa (born 1965)
- Sara Stridsberg (born 1972)
- August Strindberg (1849–1912)
- Eva Ström (born 1947)
- Fredrik Ström (1880–1948)
- Per Olof Sundman (1922–1992)
- Maria Sveland (born 1974)
- Sven G. Svenson (1919–1997)

== T ==
- Evert Taube (1890–1976)
- Esaias Tegnér (1782–1846), poet
- Kerstin Thorvall (1925–2010)
- Carl L. Thunberg (born 1963)
- Zacharias Topelius (also known as Zachris Topelius; 1818–1898), historical novelist, librettist, poet
- Tomas Tranströmer (1931–2015), poet
- Stieg Trenter (1914–1967)
- Birgitta Trotzig (1929–2011)
- Göran Tunström (1937–2000)
- Helene Tursten (born 1954)

== V ==
- Carl-Johan Vallgren (born 1964)
- Gunnel Vallquist (1918–2016)

== W ==
- Elin Wägner (1882–1949)
- Mats Wahl (1945–2025)
- Per Wahlöö (1926–1975)
- Eva Waldemarsson (1908–1986)
- Per Wästberg (born 1933)
- Adéle Weman (1844–1936), wrote under the names Parus Ater, Inga Storm and Zakarias
- Paulina Westdahl (1810–1887)
- Einar af Wirsén (1875–1946)

== Z ==
- Joakim Zander (born 1975)

== See also ==
- List of Finnish women writers
- List of Swedish poets
- List of Swedish women writers
- List of Swedes
- Lists of writers
- Svenska Vitterhetssamfundet (The Swedish Society for Belles-Lettres)
