= Falkman =

Falkman is a surname. Notable people with the surname include:

- Charlotta Falkman (1795–1882), Swedish-Finnish novelist
- Craig Falkman (born 1943), American ice hockey player
- Kaj Falkman (1934–2018), Swedish diplomat
- Loa Falkman (born 1947), Swedish opera singer and actor
- Olena Falkman (1849–1928), Swedish concert vocalist
