= Albert Olsson =

Albert Olsson may refer to:

- Albert Olsson (writer) (1904–1994), Swedish writer and teacher
- Albert Olsson (footballer) (1896–1977), Swedish footballer
- Albert Julius Olsson (1864–1942), British maritime artist
