= Eurotowns =

EUROTOWNS
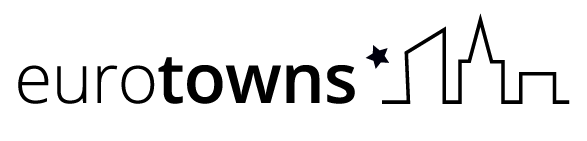
- Formation: 1991
- Type: Network of medium-sized cities
- Region served: Europe
- Members: 20 member cities
- Official language: English
- Secretariat: Sindelfingen
- Website: www.eurotowns.org

Eurotowns is a network of medium-sized European cities with a population between 50,000 and 250,000 inhabitants. The organisation was founded in 1991. Its members include Avilés, Böblingen, Chełm, Detmold, Eskilstuna, Gävle, Girona, Haarlem, Halmstad, Hasselt, Jyväskylä, Manresa, Reggio Emilia, Roeselare, Sabadell, Schiedam, Sindelfingen, Solingen, Ulm, and Varberg.

== Mission ==
The Eurotowns network aims to address the issues of sustainability, innovation and welfare in small to medium-sized cities, in order to support the achievement of the EU 2030 strategy objectives. Among the aims of Eurotowns are to promote the exchange of good practices, to represent the interests of medium-sized European city, to promote European projects between members of the network, and to provide tools for innovation and knowledge. In order to underline the specific scale of those medium-sized cities, their USP has been translated as : "big enough to cope, small enough to care".

== Structure ==
All members of the Eurotowns network participate in a General Assembly which compares political and technical achievements. The Assembly elects an Executive Council every two years, a body that ensures the implementation of the projects carried out by the network. Members of Eurotowns participate in the work of "Task Teams", working groups that promote ideas of projects, study, research and comparison that receive funding to develop these activities. Currently there are five task teams: innovation, mobility, culture, social inclusion and SDGs. The main strategy is pointed out by a Strategic Policy Group.

== Policy priorities ==
Eurotowns advocates priorities based on the challenges of Europe 2030
