= Tora Sandström =

Swedish psychoanalyst (1886–1949)

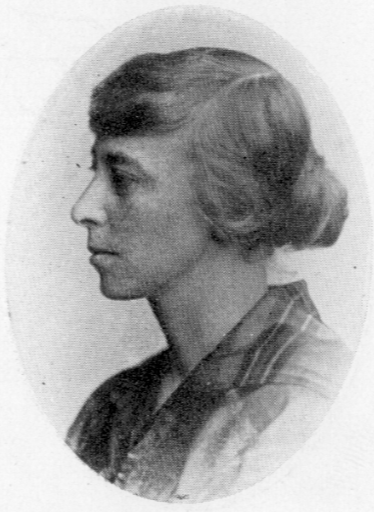
- Born: Emma Victoria Sandström; 12 March 1886; Arnäs parish, Sweden
- Died: 25 October 1949 (aged 63); Stockholm, Sweden
- Education: Higher Teachers' Seminary
- Occupations: Psychologist, psychotherapist
- Known for: Psychotherapeutic practice

Emma Victoria "Tora" Sandström (12 March 1886 – 25 October 1949) was a Swedish psychotherapist and psychoanalyst. She was one of the very earliest psychoanalysts in Sweden and as early as the 1930s, she started a private psychotherapeutic clinic.

== Biography ==
Tora Sandström was born in Arnäs parish to a family of farmers. Her father's name was Johan Sandström and her mother was Katarina Charlotta. Tora Sandström trained at the Higher Teachers' Seminary and worked as a teacher in Hamburg, Germany, and in Sweden. She furthered her education in philosophy and psychoanalysis and obtained a licentiate degree in philosophy but never completed her dissertation for a doctorate.

=== Psychoanalyst ===
Sandström became interested in psychoanalysis and spent the 1920s and the first years of the 1930s in Vienna, Austria, where she conducted studies on the subject. She continued her studies when she came back to Stockholm. She studied so-called educational analysis with Alfhild Tamm and participated in the formation of the Finnish-Swedish psychoanalytical association in 1934 and for several years was also its secretary.

The Swedish psychoanalytical association was initially a relatively small association and Sandström was, according to the association's protocol, one of the relatively few people who was steadily active at the association's meetings during the 1940s. As she did not have a medical education, she was called a lay analyst. During the 1940s, she lectured on medical psychology for doctors and medics at the Serafimerlasaret in Stockholm. She thus worked in the borderland between medicine, psychology and pedagogy. At the same time, she actively contributed to influencing the then Medical Board to recognize clinical psychological practice and the psychology profession as its own activity rather than an auxiliary activity to medicine. Sandström was not alone in pursuing this issue. However, her efforts were considerable and significant. In 1954, the Swedish Association of Psychologists was formed to deal with issues of education, professional ethics and identification.

=== Author ===
In 1935, her book A Psychoanalytic Women's Study: Ernst Ahlgren – Victoria Benedictsson was published at Albert Bonniers Förlag. The book received a mixed reception. It was received as innovative but partly as too "Freudian." Sandström was hoping her text would form the basis for a doctoral thesis at Lund University, but it was not accepted. According to Nilsson, "the newly appointed professor of psychology and pedagogy John Landquist ... advised against it. He considered that the book, despite Victoria Benedictsson's astute observations, suffered from 'a pronounced Freudian orthodoxy.' Landquist would later, when Sandström openly orientated herself towards Alfred Adler's personality psychology, support [her] more unreservedly."

Based on her interest in philosophy, she wrote the book Begreppsanalys på avvägar, published by Natur & Kultur in 1944. It includes criticism of the positions put forward by her former philosophy teacher Adolf Phalén. The book was reviewed in international scientific journals but had no impact. Sandström published herself in scientific journals such as Acta Psychiatrica Scandinavica. She also contributed to popular science books such as Själens läkarbok, in 1943. Her book Self-assertion and neurosis, A psychoanalytic reorientation was published in 1945 at Natur & Kultur. It had been published in German six years earlier and also published by Bonnier's publisher, but it does not seem to have had any impact either.

=== Practitioner ===
In the 1930s, Sandström started her own private practice where she provided psychological consultation, treatment and psychotherapy. At that time, none of these concepts had been defined and there was no official training available for either clinical psychologists or psychotherapists. Sandström had her basic training in classical psychoanalysis, based on Sigmund Freud's theories, concepts and methods, but gradually came to work increasingly based on Alfred Adler's individual psychology, which places importance on people's feelings of inferiority as breeding grounds for claims of power and aggression, both in their writings and in clinical practice.

In her private practice, according to Nilsson, "She analyzed the current situation of her patients and encouraged them to live out their aggressiveness. Now she became increasingly dismissive of Freud's theories; she found his system filled with 'superstitious notions.'"

In 1949, Tora Sandström died in Stockholm.
