= ReTuna =

Shopping mall in Eskilstuna, Sweden

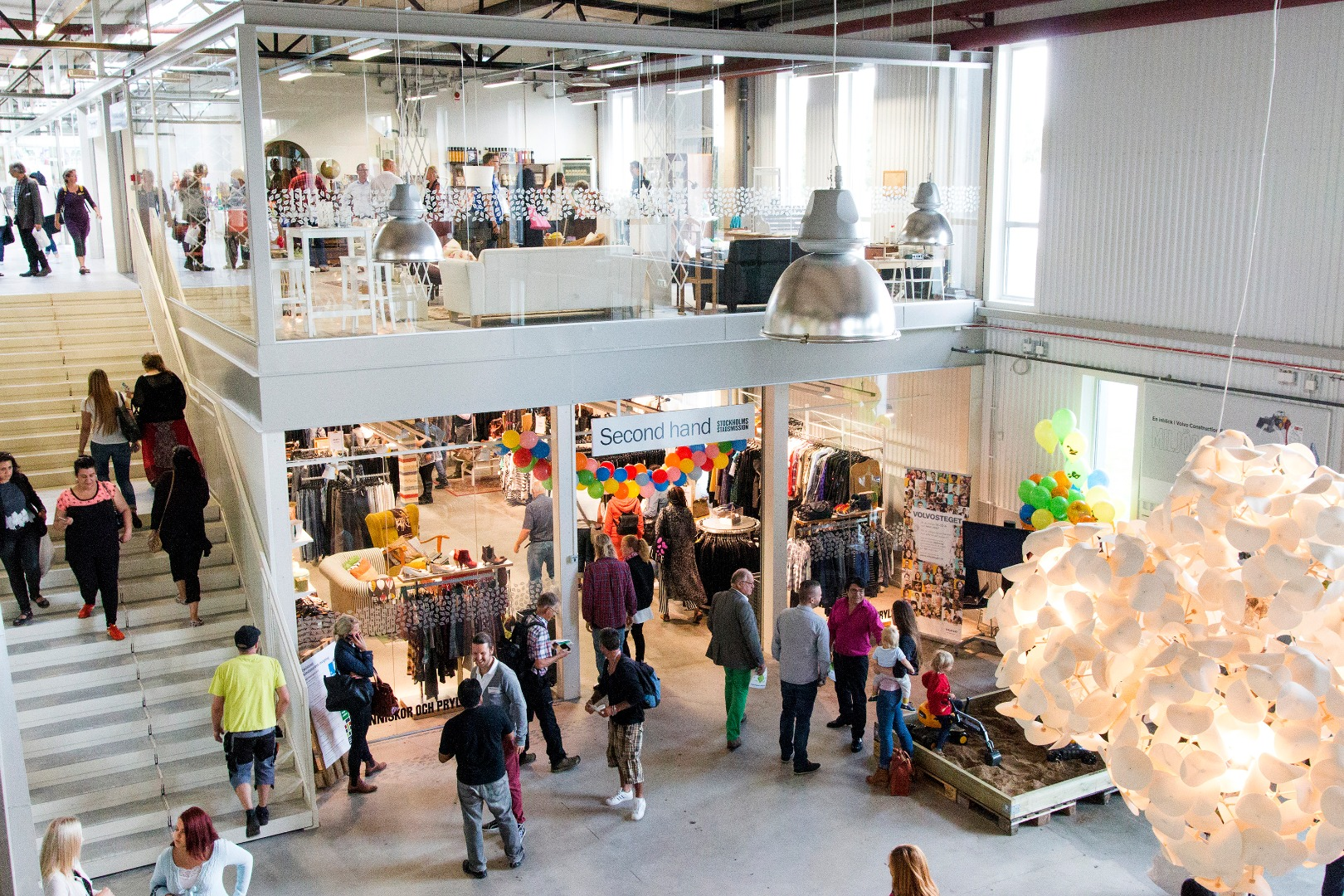
The entrance to the ReTuna Gallery

ReTuna Återbruksgalleria (ReTuna Reuse Gallery, or simply ReTuna) is a shopping mall in Eskilstuna, Sweden, which exclusively sells second hand and recycled goods. It is situated next to the town's recycling center, and has 3,000 m^{2} of shopping space occupied by 14 shops, including a sports goods store, electronics outlet, fashion boutique, gardening center, and toy store. The mall serves both as a shopping center and as a public education center. Events, lectures, and workshops are all held on the premises to educate the public about sustainability.

The mall opened in 2015 and is run by the municipality-owned company Eskilstuna Energi och Miljö. The mall averages over 700 visitors a day and a turnover of $1.8 million a year.
