= Sigrid Ekendahl =

Swedish politician (1904–1996)

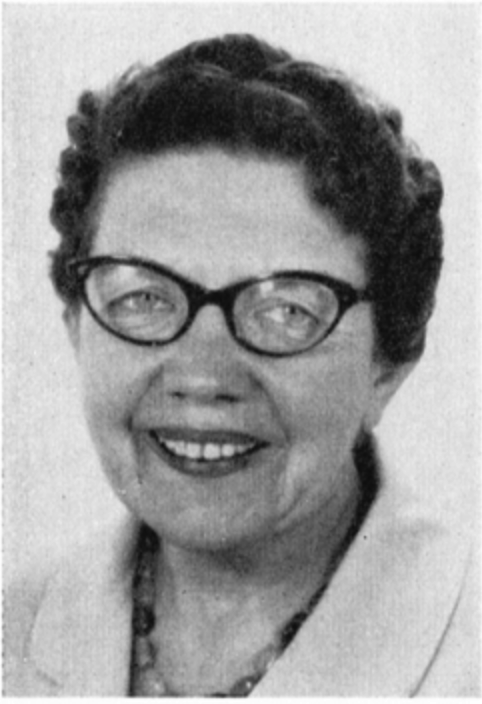
Sigrid Ekendahl in 1959

Sigrid Ekendahl (1904-1996) was a Swedish politician of the Social Democratic Party. Born in Eskilstuna, she worked as a nursing home assistant and then a waitress at the local hotel. She moved to Stockholm in 1927, and while working in the restaurant industry became involved with the labor movement. She was a trade union official and the only female board member of the Swedish Trade Union Confederation. She successfully fought for the elimination of a separate pay schedule for women.She was MP of the Second Chamber of the Parliament of Sweden from 1940 to 1948 and 1956 to 1968.
