= Carl Victor Heljestrand =

Swedish industrialist

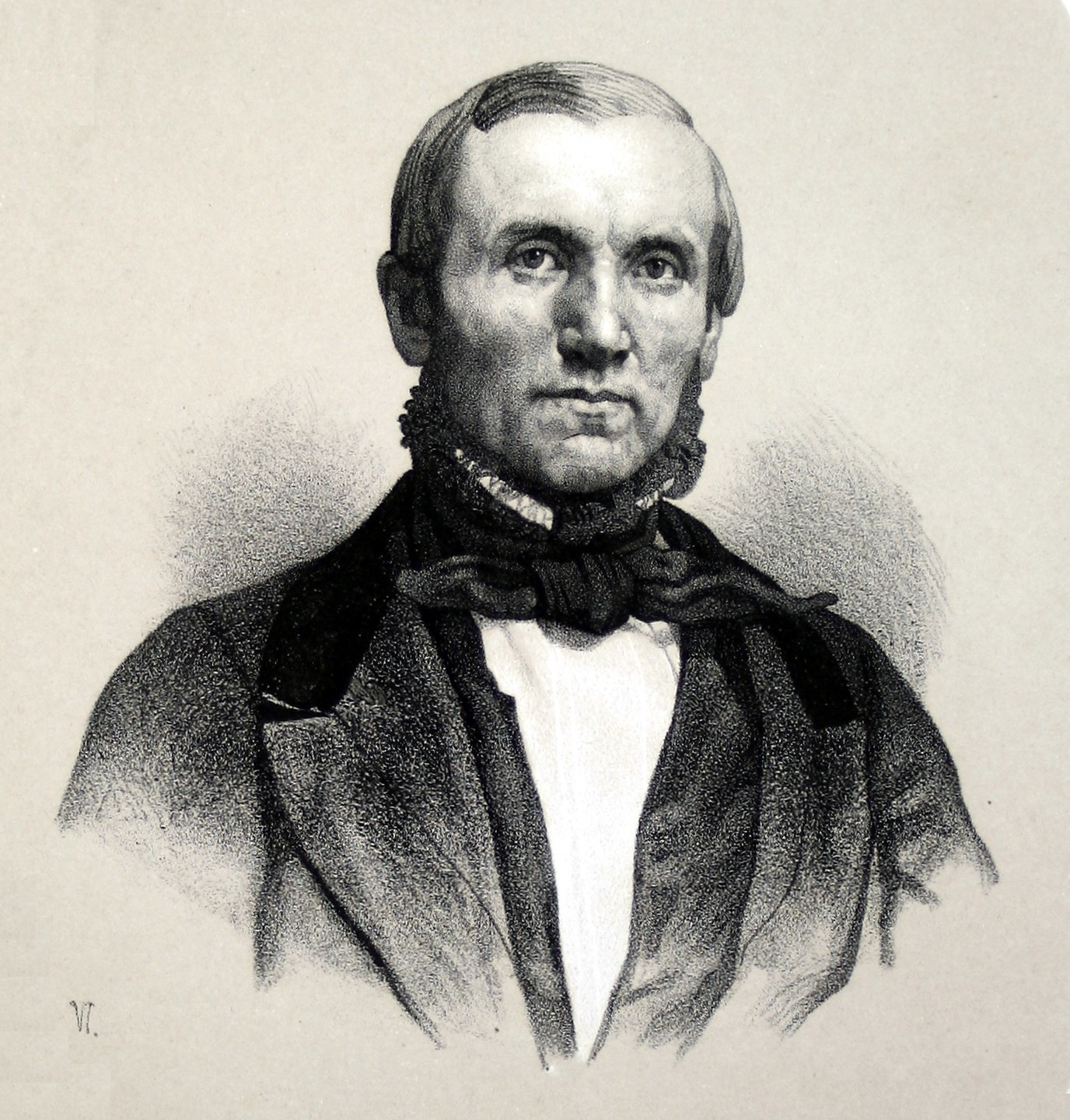
Carl Victor Heljestrand

Carl Victor Heljestrand was a Swedish industrialist who lived and worked in Eskilstuna, Sweden for most of his life.

He was born in Eskilstuna on 30 January 1816 and died on 29 July 1861. He is noted for his work in the company started by his father, Alderman Olof Heljestrand, which produced steel products such as scissors, table forks, knives and straight razors.

The company (C.V. Heljestrand AB) filed for bankruptcy in 1980.
