= Ernst Didring =

Swedish author

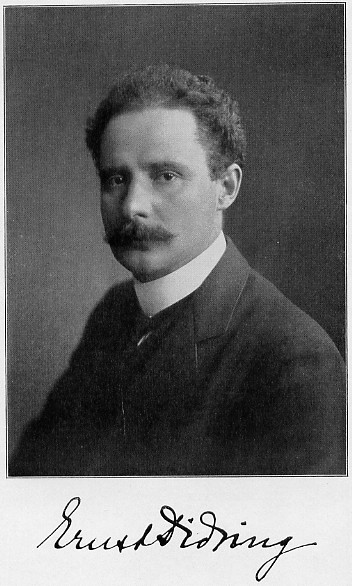
- Didring in 1900
- Born: 18 October 1868 Stockholm, Sweden
- Died: 13 October 1931 (aged 62) Stockholm, Sweden
- Literary movement: Naturalism
- Notable awards: Samfundet De Nio's grand prize

Ernst Didring (18 October 1868 – 13 October 1931) was an early 20th-century author who wrote mainly of life in his home country of Sweden.

== Biography ==
Born 18 October 1868 in Stockholm, Didring aspired to a career in teaching, but was unable to complete his studies due to lack of money. Instead, by 1884 he was working as an office clerk in the head office of the Swedish railways, and in 1899 he married a Danish teacher, Jeanne Rye. He was very involved in the founding of Statsbanens Pensionering, the railroad pension, in 1910, and was a full-time writer from 1914. Between 1915 and 1920 he was the leader of the Swedish Red Cross for prisoners of the war. Also during that time, and then again in 1923 to 1929, he was the leader of Sweden's writers society. In the intervening years (1920–1922) he traveled through Europe (France, Switzerland, Italy and Germany). In 1931 he was awarded the prestigious "Large Prize" by the literary institution Samfundet De Nio. He died, aged 62, in Stockholm.

== Works ==
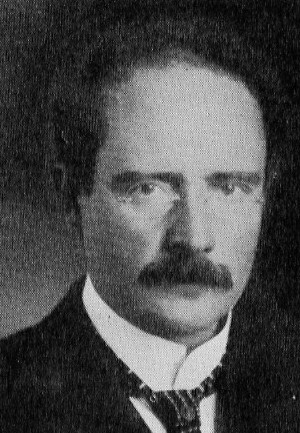
In 1930

Ernst Didring was a proponent of naturalism.

His main series and best known book is the novel trilogy Malm ('iron ore') which was published between 1914 and 1925. It describes life in the north of Sweden at the beginning of the 20th century.

1. Pioneers: a detailed description of the construction of the railway from Kiruna to Narvik.
2. The Mountain's Song: portrays work in the mining company.
3. Speculators: the last part describes shareholders of the iron companies in Stockholm – the ups and downs before World War I.

Some of his other novels are also important in the history of Swedish literature:

1. Grålöga—Trilogin: former life in the Stockholm archipelago (1925–27);
2. Världsspindeln: 'The World's Spider' (circa 1925);
3. Det mörkblå frimärket: 'The Dark Blue Stamp' (1932).

They paint a comprehensive picture of life in Swedish society around 1900 which is relevant even today. Often there were only several months between the publication of the original book and translation to other European languages. His work was especially well-recognized in Germany. Didring also wrote some theater plays which were well known in Stockholm in his time.

Many of his books can still be bought in second-hand bookshops or loaned from Swedish or German libraries. There are also some unabridged audiobooks available from the Swedish Agency for Accessible Media's digital library Legimus.

== See also ==
- List of Swedish language writers
