= Eskilstuna =

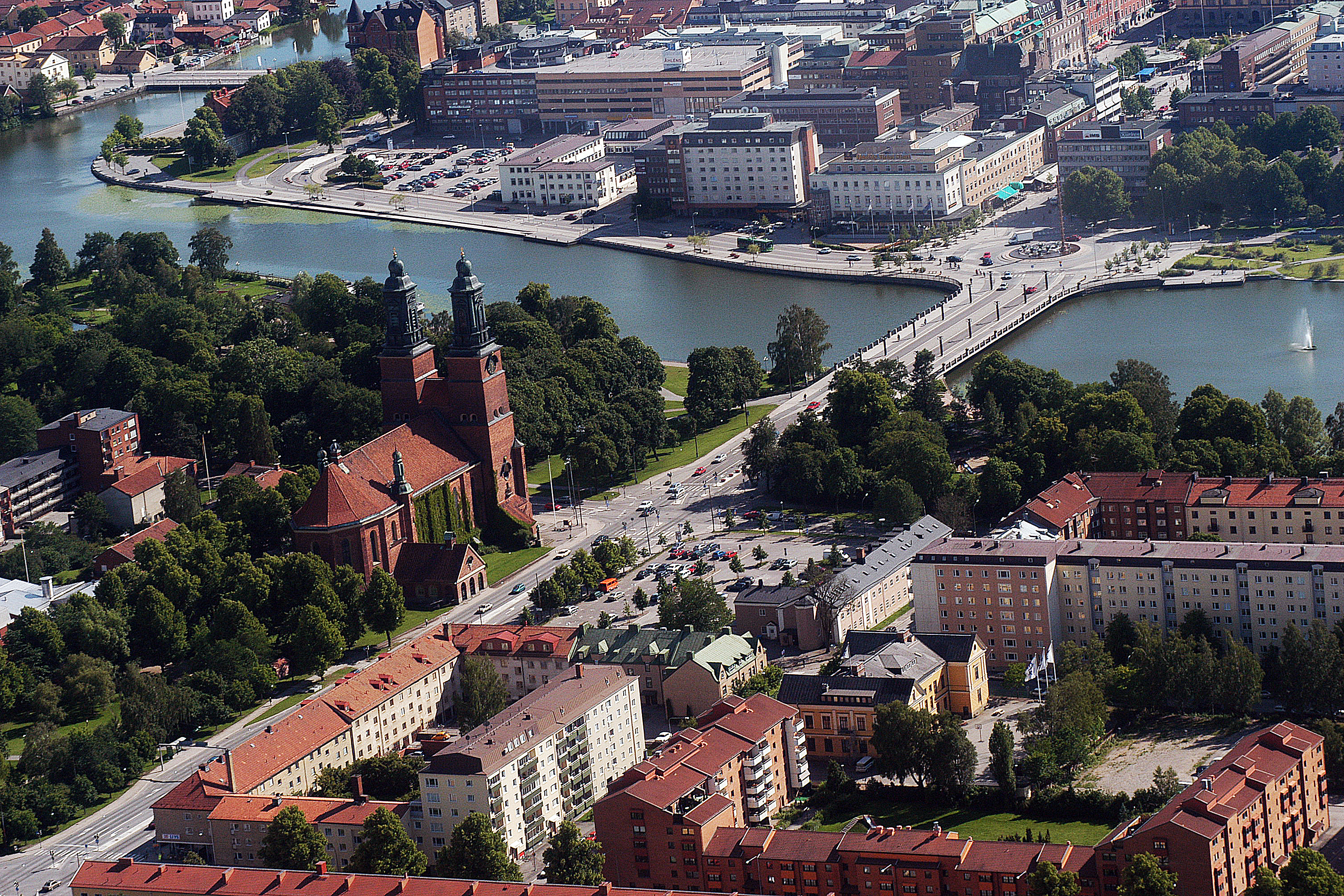
- Aerial photo of Eskilstuna in 2004

- Location within Södermanland Location within Sweden
- Coordinates: 59°22′15″N 16°30′35″E
- Country: Sweden
- Province: Södermanland
- County: Södermanland County
- Municipality: Eskilstuna Municipality
- Founded: 1659

Area
  - Total: 31.05 km^{2} (11.99 sq mi)
- Elevation: 26 m (85 ft)

Population (2020)
  - Total: 69,948
  - Density: 2,083/km^{2} (5,390/sq mi)
- Time zone: UTC+1 (CET)
  - Summer (DST): UTC+2 (CEST)
- Postal code: 630 03 to 638 21
- Area code: (+46) 16
- Website: Official website

Eskilstuna (Swedish pronunciation: [ˈɛ̂sːkɪlsˌtʉːna]) is a city and the seat of Eskilstuna Municipality, Södermanland County, Sweden. The city of Eskilstuna had 69,948 inhabitants in 2020, with a total population of 107,806 inhabitants in Eskilstuna municipality 2023. Eskilstuna has a large Sweden Finn population. The town is located on the River Eskilstunaån, which connects Lake Hjälmaren and Lake Mälaren.

== History ==
Eskilstuna's history dates back to medieval times, when English monk Saint Eskil made "Tuna" his base and diocese of the South coast of Lake Mälaren. Saint Eskil was stoned to death by the pagan Vikings of neighboring town Strängnäs, 30 km (19 mi) east of Eskilstuna, when he tried to convert them to Christianity. Saint Eskil was buried in his monastery church in Tuna.

The monastery of Saint Eskil was completely destroyed by Swedish King Gustav Vasa during the Protestant Reformation and was replaced with the royal castle of Eskilstuna House.

Later, the pagan city of Strängnäs was Christianized and given the privilege of becoming the diocese of South Lake Mälaren, and "Eskil" was combined with "Tuna", although the town of Eskilstuna did not receive municipal privileges due to its proximity to the medieval city of Torshälla. The city's first city privileges were granted in 1659, and its boundaries included Tunafors and the newly founded town of Karl Gustavs Stad (City of Karl Gustav), located on the west side of the river.

Karl Gustavs Stad was built around the iron forges of master smith Reinhold Rademacher, encouraged by King Karl X Gustav. The first products of the forges were small arms and artillery. It was a free town from 1771, where manufacturers and craftsmen were allowed to establish tax-free workshops and factories. The town was merged with the rest of Eskilstuna in 1879.

The city grew enormously during the Industrial Revolution and became one of the most important industrial cities of Sweden, earning the nickname "Stålstaden" (The City of Steel). Aside from firearms, the city also produced superior carpentry and wood-carving chisels, cutlery, scissors, keys, machine tools, and precision instruments. As a tribute to the steel industry, the figure of a steel worker is included in the city's coat of arms. Eskilstuna is sometimes called the Sheffield of Sweden. Both cities at their peak were home to numerous steel-production companies.

== Economy ==
Eskilstuna remains an important industrial city with internationally known companies such as Volvo wheel loaders, main site for the heavy construction equipment division of Volvo, Assa (locks, keys), and stainless steel manufacturer Outokumpu, Thin Strip Nyby in Torshälla.

Mälardalen University (Mälardalens högskola), founded in cooperation with the neighboring city of Västerås, has a campus in the city. The city also has a combined zoo and amusement park – Parken Zoo.

The hospital, Mälarsjukhuset is one of the largest in the region, employing around 3000 people.

Starting in 2012, the town has been pivoting towards a green economy, including biogas-powered public transit and cogeneration plants, seven-colored recycling bins (compared to the standard Swedish five), and a recycling center with an attached second-hand mall.

== Climate ==
Eskilstuna has a climate transitioning between continental and maritime with vast seasonal differences for a southern Swedish climate. Unlike the coastal part of the Sörmlandic region, Eskilstuna has higher diurnal temperature variation and stronger waves of either heat or cold. With regards to daytime maximum and minimum temperatures, the weather station has been operated since 1961 with three breaks of 2–3 years each between 1984 and 2008.

Climate data for Eskilstuna (2002–2022 averages; extremes since 1961)
Month	Jan	Feb	Mar	Apr	May	Jun	Jul	Aug	Sep	Oct	Nov	Dec	Year
Record high °C (°F)	10.5 (50.9)	12.2 (54.0)	15.6 (60.1)	26.1 (79.0)	29.0 (84.2)	32.0 (89.6)	36.2 (97.2)	35.1 (95.2)	29.0 (84.2)	21.5 (70.7)	16.9 (62.4)	11.3 (52.3)	36.2 (97.2)
Mean maximum °C (°F)	6.9 (44.4)	7.5 (45.5)	13.2 (55.8)	19.2 (66.6)	24.8 (76.6)	27.9 (82.2)	30.2 (86.4)	28.3 (82.9)	22.8 (73.0)	16.1 (61.0)	11.7 (53.1)	7.4 (45.3)	30.7 (87.3)
Mean daily maximum °C (°F)	0.2 (32.4)	1.2 (34.2)	5.6 (42.1)	11.7 (53.1)	17.1 (62.8)	21.3 (70.3)	23.7 (74.7)	22.2 (72.0)	17.1 (62.8)	10.3 (50.5)	5.4 (41.7)	1.7 (35.1)	11.5 (52.6)
Daily mean °C (°F)	−2.8 (27.0)	−2.3 (27.9)	1.3 (34.3)	5.8 (42.4)	11.0 (51.8)	15.2 (59.4)	17.7 (63.9)	16.6 (61.9)	12.1 (53.8)	6.6 (43.9)	2.8 (37.0)	−1.2 (29.8)	6.9 (44.4)
Mean daily minimum °C (°F)	−5.7 (21.7)	−5.5 (22.1)	−3.1 (26.4)	−0.2 (31.6)	4.8 (40.6)	9.1 (48.4)	11.6 (52.9)	10.6 (51.1)	7.1 (44.8)	2.8 (37.0)	0.2 (32.4)	−4.0 (24.8)	2.3 (36.2)
Mean minimum °C (°F)	−19.0 (−2.2)	−16.9 (1.6)	−12.6 (9.3)	−7.3 (18.9)	−3.2 (26.2)	2.3 (36.1)	5.4 (41.7)	3.4 (38.1)	−1.1 (30.0)	−5.7 (21.7)	−9.2 (15.4)	−16.2 (2.8)	−21.7 (−7.1)
Record low °C (°F)	−29.5 (−21.1)	−32.2 (−26.0)	−23.8 (−10.8)	−11.7 (10.9)	−7.2 (19.0)	−1.7 (28.9)	2.9 (37.2)	0.7 (33.3)	−6.2 (20.8)	−11.6 (11.1)	−21.1 (−6.0)	−32.2 (−26.0)	−32.2 (−26.0)
Average precipitation mm (inches)	40.2 (1.58)	31.9 (1.26)	23.7 (0.93)	27.2 (1.07)	44.7 (1.76)	64.2 (2.53)	62.3 (2.45)	73.5 (2.89)	40.4 (1.59)	56.9 (2.24)	48.0 (1.89)	43.9 (1.73)	556.9 (21.92)
Source 1: SMHI Open Data
Source 2: SMHI Open Data

== Demography ==
Demographics
	1800	1850	1900	1950	2000	2010
Inhabitants	1,341	3,961	13,663	53,363	88,404	96,311

As of December 31, 2019, Eskilstuna Municipality has a population of 106,859 people, making it the 15th-largest municipality in Sweden.

== Sport ==
Handball club Eskilstuna Guif, playing in the national top division, has reached the Swedish championship final four times (1997, 2001, 2009, and 2011), but lost on each occasion. Eskilstuna is also home to Eskilstuna Flygklubb, Sweden's largest glider-flying club, which hosted the World Gliding Championships in 2006.

Eskilstuna has had three men's football teams playing in the highest tier Allsvenskan; IFK Eskilstuna has played 14 seasons in Allsvenskan, AFC Eskilstuna two seasons, and Eskilstuna City one season. The women's football team, Eskilstuna United DFF, plays in the Elitettan, the second tier of women's football in Sweden, and spent nine seasons in the highest tier Damallsvenskan between 2014 and 2022. The team finished as runner-up in 2015, qualifying it for the 2016–17 UEFA Women's Champions League.

The speedway team in Eskilstuna, Smederna, competes in the highest speedway league in Sweden, Elitserien and races its home matches at Smedstadion outside Eskilstuna. They formerly raced at the Snälltorpet track before it was sold for housing in 2001.

In eSports, Eskilstuna is home to CS:GO player Maikelele.

The stadium Tunavallen was a venue for the 1958 FIFA World Cup, hosting one match between Paraguay and Yugoslavia. It has also been used for several practice games for the Swedish national youth teams. Sports clubs using Tunavallen include AFC Eskilstuna, Eskilstuna United DFF, Eskilstuna City FK, and IFK Eskilstuna. Eskilstuna Södra FF is based at Skogsängens IP and BK Sport is based at Ekängen.

== Transport ==
Eskilstuna is served by Eskilstuna Central Station. Regional operator Mälartåg runs trains on the via Eskilstuna to destinations such as Linköping, Örebro, Stockholm, Stockholm Arlanda Airport, and Uppsala. European route E20 passes the city. The city has a minor airport, 13 km (8 mi) east of the centre.

== European co-operation ==
Eskilstuna is a member city of Eurotowns network.

== Notable people ==
=== Music ===
- patrikkolar
- Kent (band)
- Pain of Salvation (band)
- Anni-Frid Lyngstad
- Mika "Gas" Ieppä
- Towa Carson
- Joakim Berg
- Daniel Gildenlöw
- Kristoffer Gildenlöw
- Tikkle Me (band)

=== Athletes ===
- Anna Nordqvist
- Kent Carlsson
- Kjell Johansson
- Tomas Gustafson
- Tommy Jansson
- Linnea Torstenson
- Kristján Andrésson
- Lars Sandberg
- Joel Granfors

==== Footballers ====
- Mika Väyrynen
- Kennet Andersson
- Sebastian Larsson
- Marcus Danielson

=== Other ===
- Anna Nordqvist, professional golfer
- Anna of Finland
- Sigrid Ekendahl, trade union official and politician
- Carl Victor Heljestrand
- Fredrik Lindström
- Yvonne Ryding, Miss Sweden 1984 and Miss Universe 1984
- Susanne Aalto, radio astronomer
- Sven G. Svenson, historian and writer

== Gallery ==
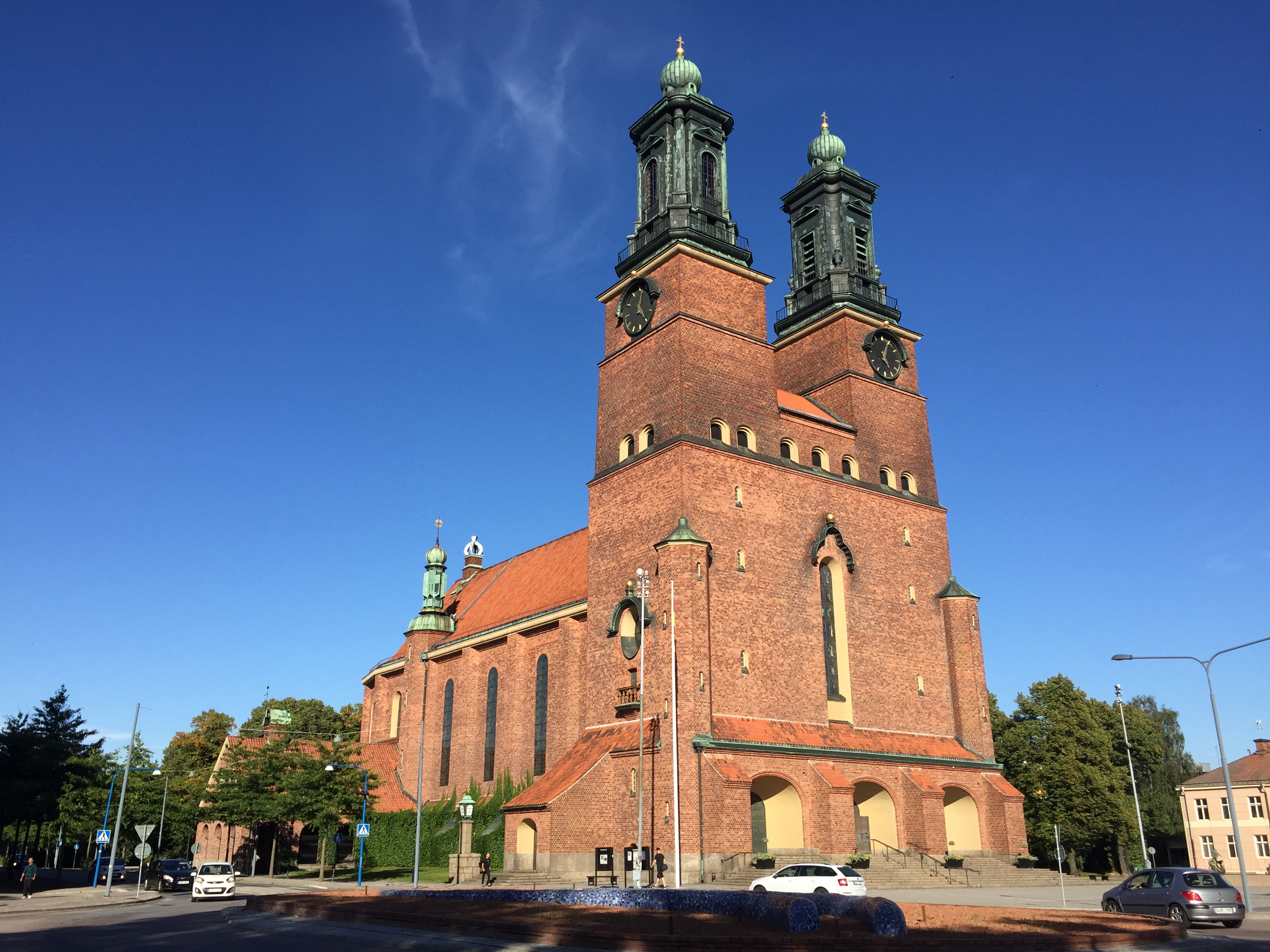
Klosters Church of Eskilstuna

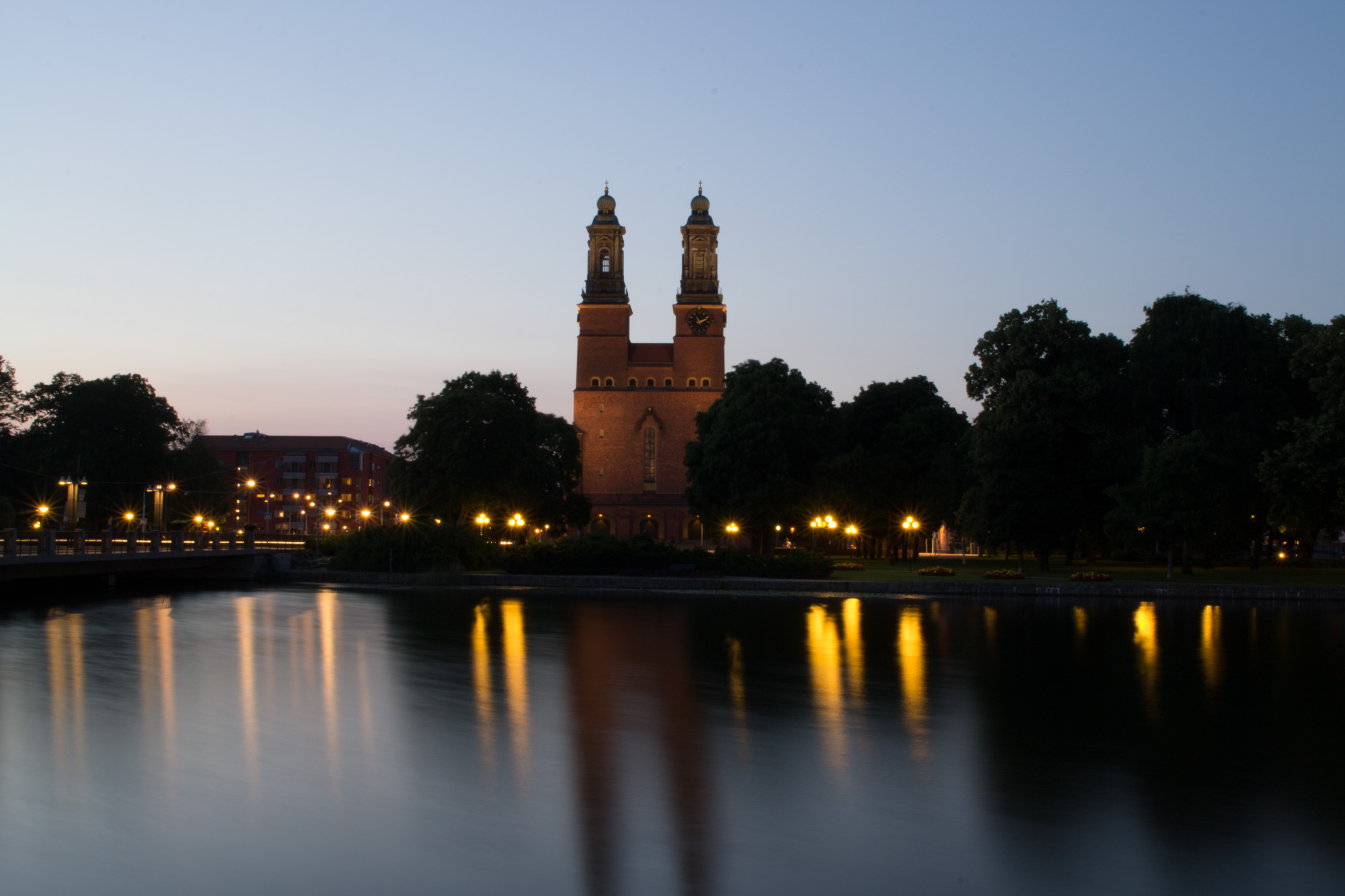

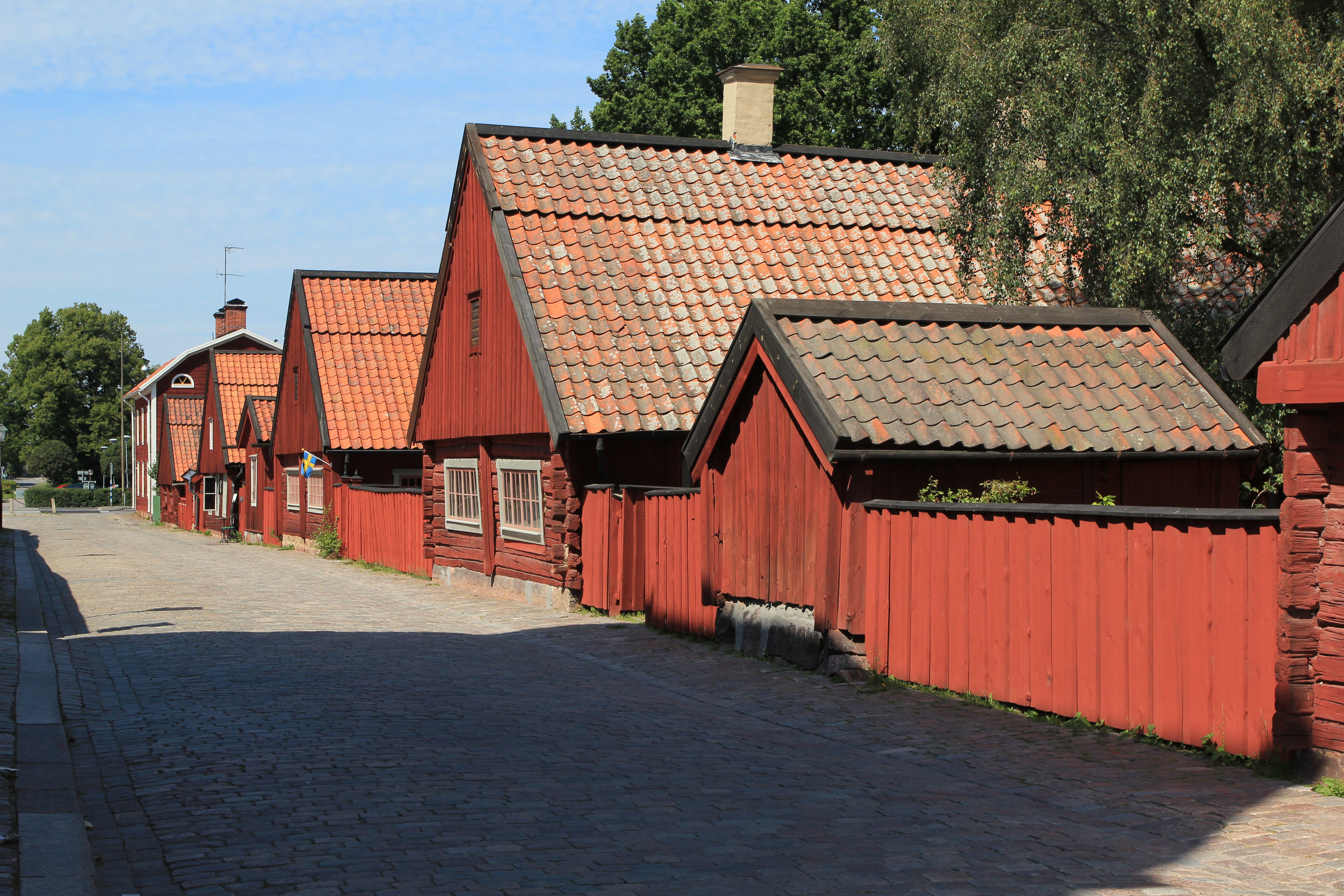
Rademachersmedjorna

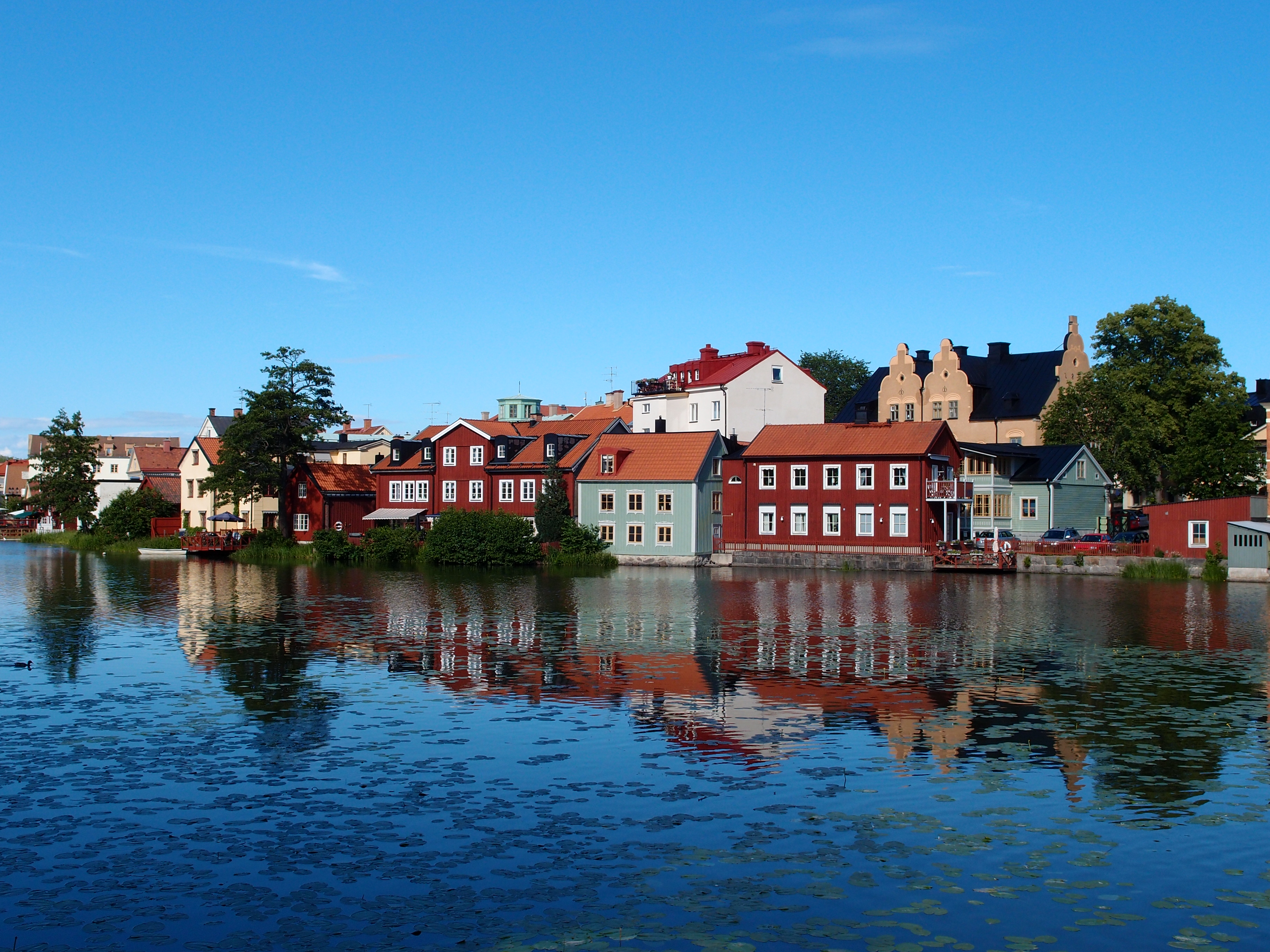
Eskilstunaån

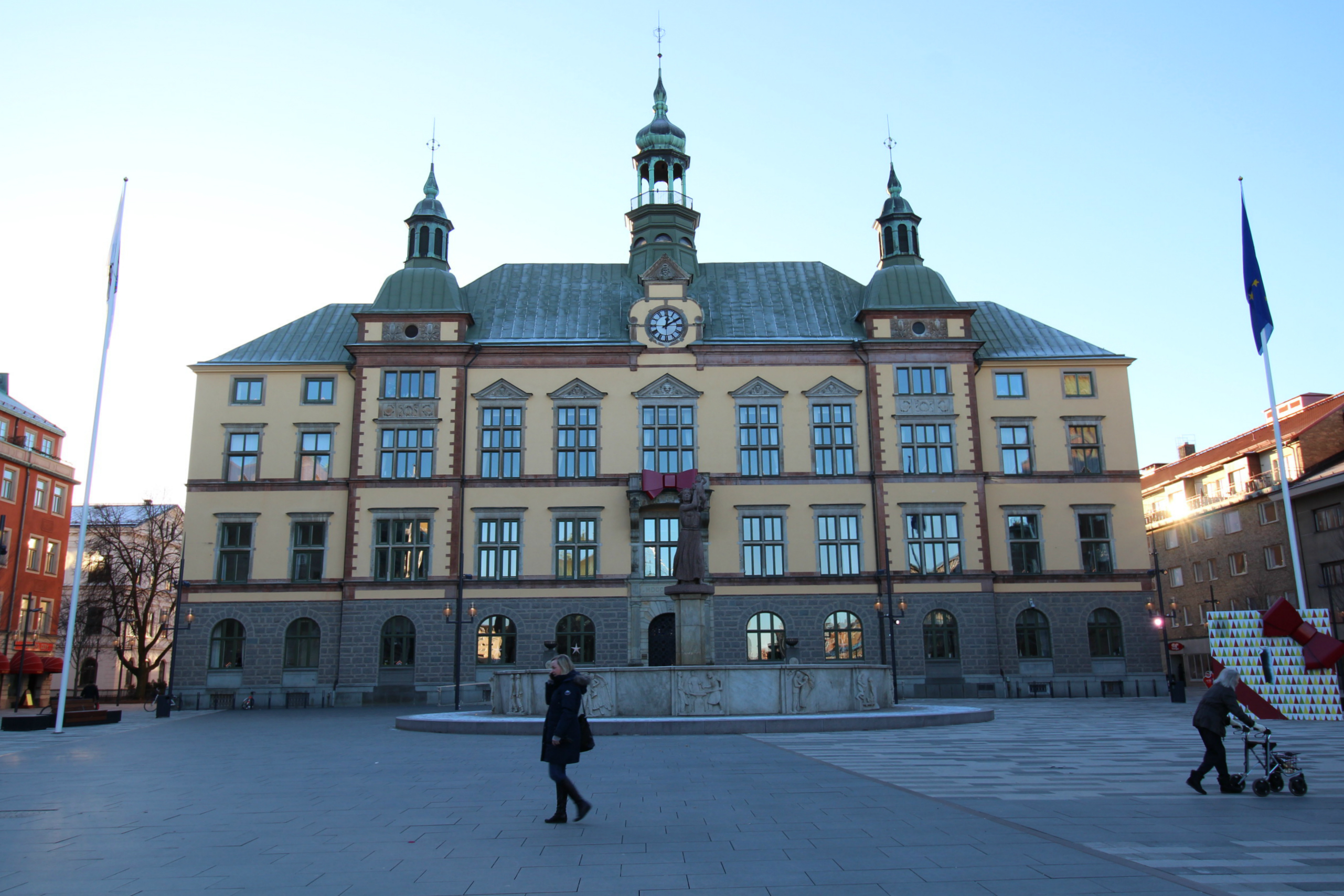
Stadshuset

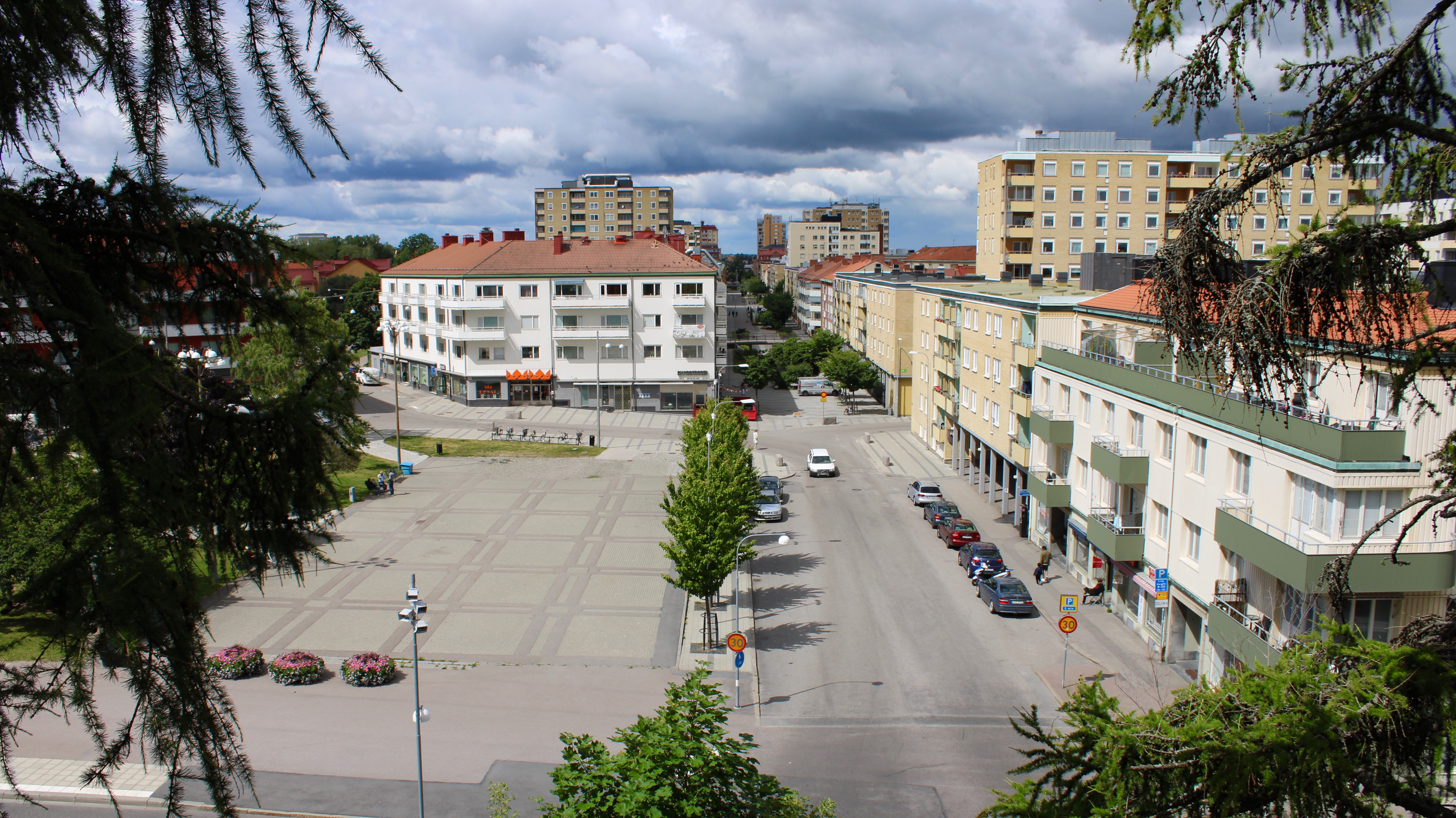
Nyfors, Eskilstuna

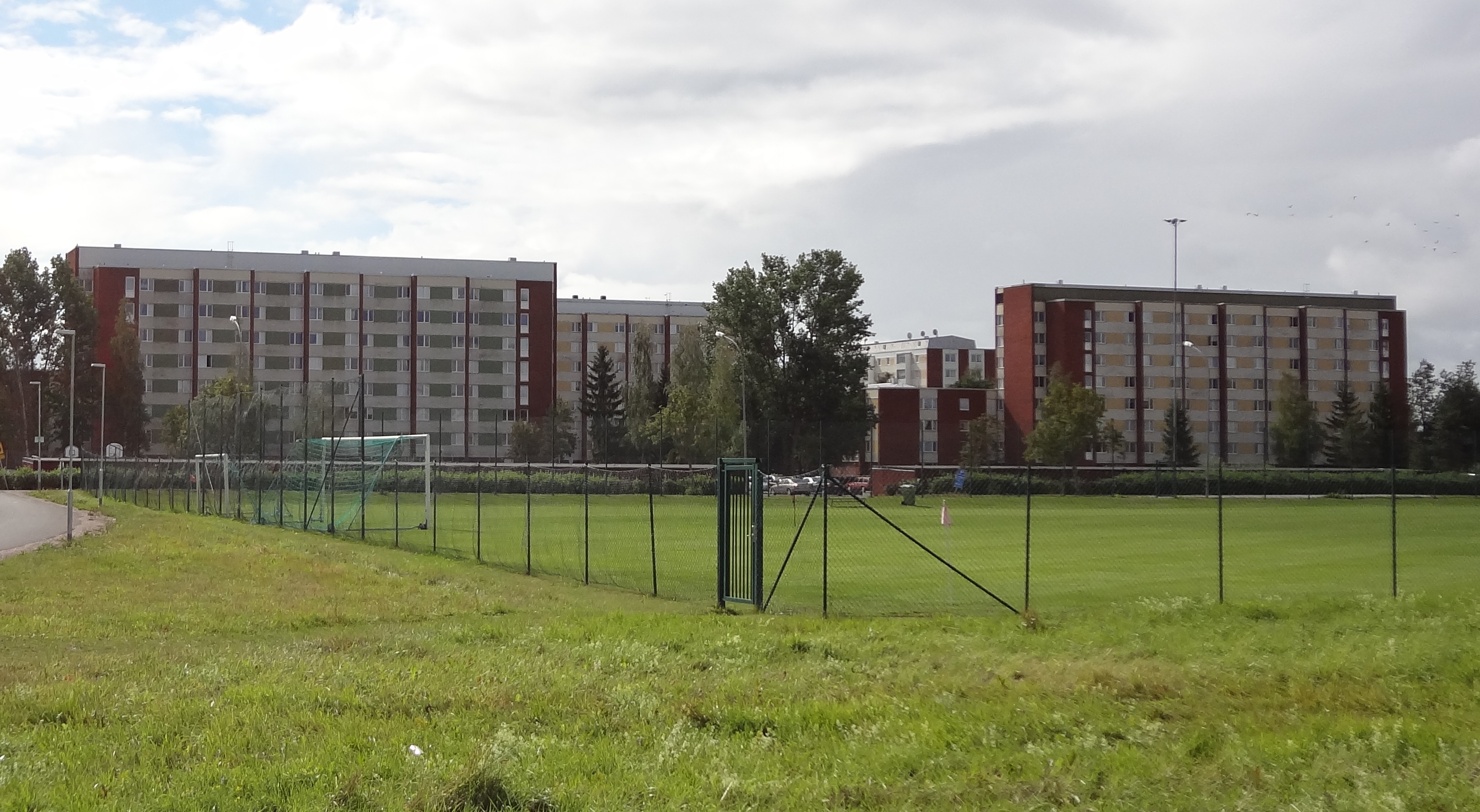
Årby in Eskilstuna

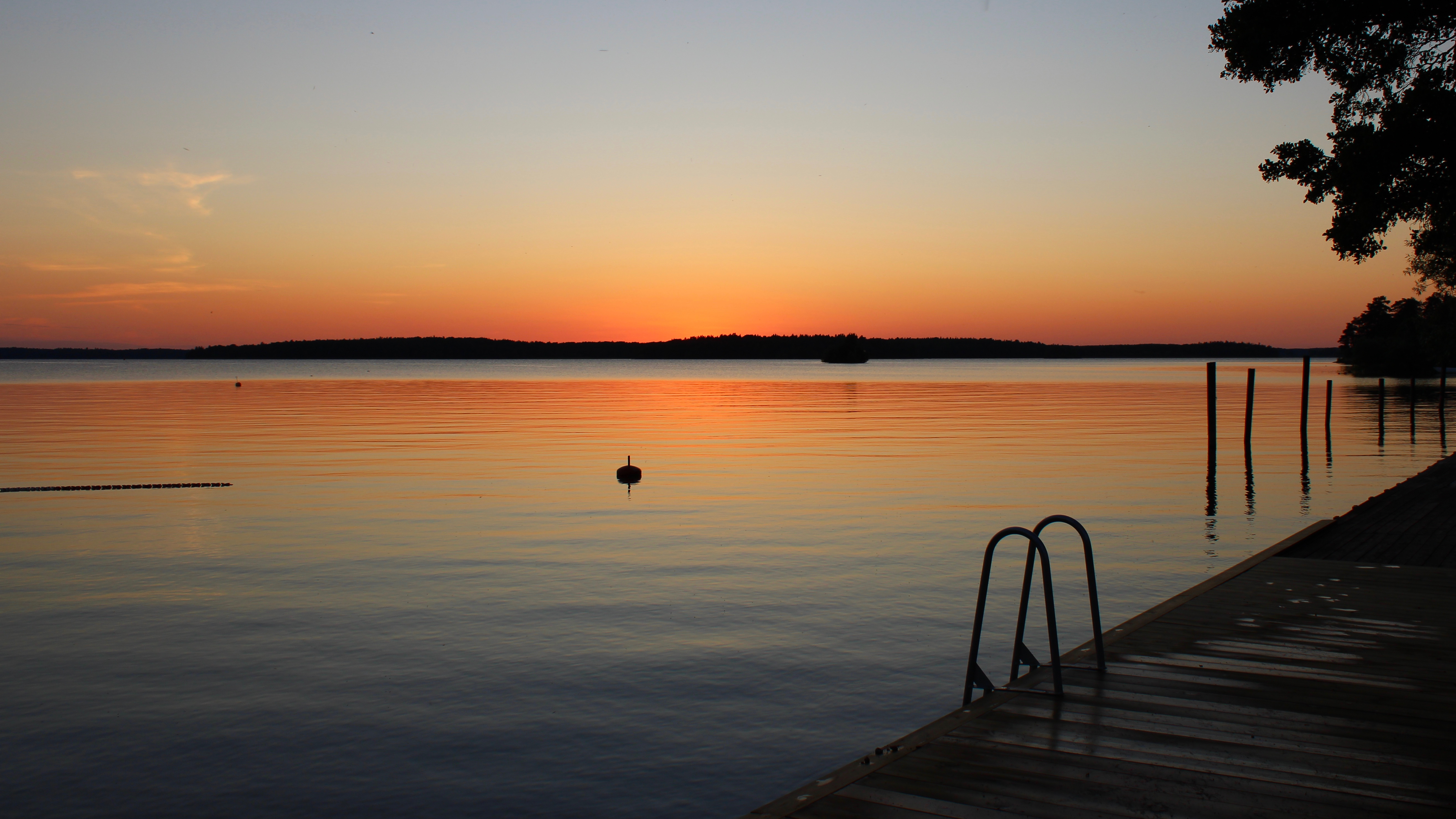
Sunset over lake Mälaren, viewed from Mälarbaden in northern Eskilstuna

== See also ==
- Eskilstunaån
