= Victoria Benedictsson =

Swedish writer (1850–1888)

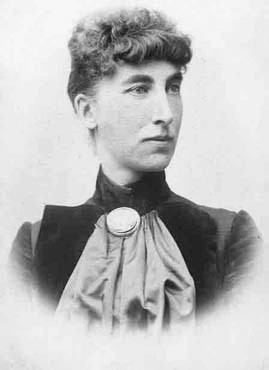
- Born: Victoria Maria Bruzelius; 6 March 1850; Domme, Skåne
- Died: 22 July 1888 (38 years); Copenhagen, Denmark
- Occupation: Author
- Spouse: Christian Benedictsson (1822 -1899)
- Writing career
- Pen name: Ernst Ahlgren
- Language: Swedish
- Notable work: Pengar (1886)

Victoria Benedictsson (6 March 1850 in Domme – 22 July 1888) was a Swedish author and playwright writing under the pen name Ernst Ahlgren. Despite her writing career being relatively short, she is, together with August Strindberg, regarded as one of the greatest proponents of the Swedish realist writing style and an important part of the Modern Breakthrough. In her novels she mainly depicts marriage problems and current women's issues, with notable works including Pengar (1885; Money) and Fru Marianne (1887; Mrs. Marianne).

== Biography ==
=== Childhood ===
Victoria Benedictsson, born Victoria Maria Bruzelius, grew up on the Charlottenberg farm in Domme in the southwestern part of the province Scania and her parents were the farmer Thure Bruzelius and Helena Sophia Finérus. Benedictsson was interested in art studies at an early age and took a job as a governess to earn money to go to Stockholm and train as an artist. However, her father, who had initially approved this, later changed his mind and denied her the opportunity.

To get away from her parents' influence, she married the postmaster of Hörby at the age of 21, Christian Benedictsson (born 1822 in Landskrona, died 1899 in Hörby). He was 49 years old and a widower with five children from his previous marriage. They had two daughters of their own, one of whom died in infancy.

Benedictsson tried for a long time to make a name for herself as an author under various pseudonyms. In the autumn of 1876, she published the novel Sirénen (The Siren) under the pseudonym Tardif in the newspaper Sydsvenska dagbladet. Based on her upbringing on a farm and her interest in the locals, she made notes on dialects and descriptions of local life for various newspapers and magazines, where she herself sketched illustrations for the stories. In her first letter to Axel Lundegård, she wrote that she had “struggled through literary difficulties for eight years under five different signatures and in five different newspapers”.

In 1882, Victoria Benedictsson fell ill with a bone disease and became bedridden.

=== Debut ===
During her illness she developed her writing and in 1884 she made her debut with the short story collection Från Skåne (From Scania). The following year, the novel Pengar (Money) was published, which became her breakthrough.

At this time she became friends with the eleven years younger Axel Lundegård, the son of the Hörby priest. Like him and many other Swedish writers during the 1880s, she sought refuge in Copenhagen, where she attracted the attention of the Danish literary critic Georg Brandes with whom she had an unrequited love affair.

Although Benedictsson never attended art school, she made a few paintings and sketches during her lifetime that are represented at Lund University Library.

=== Death ===
Benedictsson committed suicide in the summer of 1888 at Leopold's Hotel in Copenhagen, Denmark, using a razor, and she is buried in Vestre Kirkegård under the name Ernst Ahlgren.

A big part of the biographical literature on Benedictsson is concerned with explaining why the author chose to end her life. Her friend Ellen Key, who wrote the first biography on Benedictsson, found reasons in her contradictory character and social vulnerability. After Fredrik Böök's biographical works from 1949 and 1950, the focus has tended to be on her unhappy love for Georg Brandes between 1886 and 1888. Feminist literary scholars such as Jette Lundbo Levy, Ebba Witt-Brattström and Nina Björk, treat her as a pioneering feminist figure doomed to perish in a patriarchal society, as Benedictsson was deeply unhappy about the intellectually restricted life she was forced to lead in Hörby and the limitations of being a woman during this time. Birgitta Holm argues in 2007 that Benedictsson's unhappiness emanated from incestuous abuse in childhood.

Others point to more psychological reasons, such as the psychoanalyst Tora Sandström, who believes that Benedictsson was schizophrenic. A biography written by Birgitta Åkesson includes love letters between Benedictsson's stepdaughter Matti af Geijerstam and her future husband Karl af Geijerstam. These indicate that Victoria Benedictsson was exhausted and overworked with a changed emotional life is the reason for her death. Other contributing factors to her decision may have been poverty and loneliness and her concern for her writing. Her novel Fru Marianne, written the year before her death, had received mixed reviews, including negative comments from Georg Brandes and his brother Edvard writing a scathing review in the newspaper Politiken.

== Authorship ==
=== Prose and drama ===
Benedictsson's debut was the short story collection Från Skåne (1884; From Scania), containing folk tales from the Scanian countryside, where women's lives are often in focus. The following year she wrote Pengar (1885; Money), based on her own experiences, about a young and immature girl who is persuaded to marry a wealthy landowner too early, but who eventually breaks out of the marriage. The later novel Fru Marianne (1887; Mrs. Marianne) depicts a woman torn between her husband Börje, an honest and practical farmer, and his cultured friend Pål. Whereas Pengar ends in divorce, Fru Marianne presents a more utopian picture, with an ending based on understanding between the spouses and an equal marriage.

As a playwright, wrote I telefon (1887; In the telephone), which premiered at the Royal Dramatic Theatre on March 7, 1887, and was a great audience success.[12][13] She also co-wrote with Axel Lundegård the three-act play Final (1885; Finale) which premiered at the Royal Dramatic Theatre in Stockholm on November 29, 1888, that is, after Benedictsson's death. In 1888, she wrote the play Romeos Juliet, as well as Den bergtagna (The rescued), the draft of which was found after her death.

=== Biographies and research ===
In 1887, Victoria Benedictsson wrote a biographical text about the author Harriet Martineau in the magazine Dagny. In Martineau she found an equal, and the text is as much about herself as Martineau. Benedictsson's own attitude to work, criticism, and the longing for love shines through in her presentation of Martineau.

=== Posthumous publication ===
Benedictsson's literary legacy was inherited by Axel Lundegård, who gradually published a large part of it and completed a number of incomplete manuscripts. He first completed her novel Modern (1888; The mother) and the play Den bergtagna (1888; The rescued) and published her remaining short stories.

Lundegård also constructed three 'autobiographies' based on Benedictsson's letters, notes and diaries. His biography Victoria Benedictsson (1890; 2nd expanded edition 1908, 3rd expanded edition 1928) has become a great contribution to her characterization. Furthermore, his novel Elsa Finne (1902) consists largely of lightly edited extracts from her diary. It was not until 1978-1985, when Christina Sjöblad published them, that Benedictsson's diaries could be read unedited and in their entirety. Her archives are held at the University Library at Lund University. Lundegård's sometimes questionable use of Victoria Benedictsson's estate is later discussed in Lisbeth Larsson's 2008 study Hennes döda kropp (Her Dead Body), in which she shows how Lundegård processed and edited several of the works he published posthumously, including the short story Ur mörkret (Out of Darkness).

In 2013, the letter correspondence between Victoria Benedictsson and Axel Lundegård was published, making it possible for the first time to follow the authors' entire dialogue with each other.

In 1988, the editorial Jungfrun published Benedictsson's play Teorier: ett lustspel (Theories: a game of lust), which she wrote in the summer of 1887. A second edition was published by the same publisher in 1994.
