= Rut Hillarp =

Swedish poet and novelist

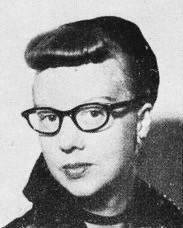
Rut Hillarp

Rut Gunhild Hillarp (21 February 1914 – 11 November 2003) was a Swedish poet and novelist. She is remembered for her modernist poetry evoking the difficulties of achieving sexual relationships in a man's world.

== Biography ==
Born in Lund in the south of Sweden, Hillarp was the daughter of Nils Bengtsson and Hulda Johansson who ran a hardware business. At the age of 18, she married her former French teacher (until the marriage broke up in 1947). The couple moved to Stockholm where she studied literature and languages, graduating in 1945. While a student, she met the poet and editor Karl Vennberg who became a lifelong friend, but it was above all the work of Erik Lindegren which encouraged her to take a serious interest in poetry.

In 1946, Hillarp published her first work, the modernist collection of poems Solens bruun, followed by Dina händers ekon (1948), and Båge av väntan (1950), all evoking the difficulties of sexual relationships in male-dominated society. She went on to write prose works on the same theme: Blodförmörkelse (1951), Sindhia (1954), En eld är havet (1956), and Kustlinje (1963).

In addition to her lyrical works, Hillarp worked in film and photography. She also wrote a diary, excerpts of which were published in 2011 in connection with Birgitta Holm's biography, Rut Hillarp. Poet och erotiskt geni (Poet and Erotic Genius). In particular, the biography provides accounts of her passionate relationships with the Romanian film director Mihail Livada, the author Sivar Arnér, and her colleagues and travel companions Gösta Oswald, Stig Sjödin and Bertil Schütt.

== Works ==
=== Poetry ===
- "Den Gamla och den Nya människan: en studie i Hans Alienus' tillkomsthistoria". In: Samlaren, 1944
- Solens brunn 1946 (poetry collection)
- Dina händers ekon 1948 (poetry collection)
- Båge av väntan 1950 (poetry collection)
- Blodförmörkelse 1951 (lyrical novel)
- Sindhia 1954 (lyrical novel)
- En eld är havet 1956 (novel)
- Kustlinje 1963 (autobiographical novel)
- Spegel under jorden 1982 (illustrated poetry)
- Penelopes väv 1985 (illustrated poetry)
- Strand för Isolde 1991 (illustrated poetry)
- Nattens språk 1995 (illustrated poetry, in Lasse Söderberg's selection)
- Dagboken 2011 (diary selection by Birgitta Holm)

=== Films ===
- Det underbara mötet (1949)
- De vita händerna (1950)
- Vart vill du rida hän? (1970)

== Literature ==
- Birgitta Holm (2011). Rut Hillarp. Poet och erotisk geni (in Swedish). Atlantis. p. 376. ISBN 9789173534758.
