= Sara Pfeiffer =

Swedish writer

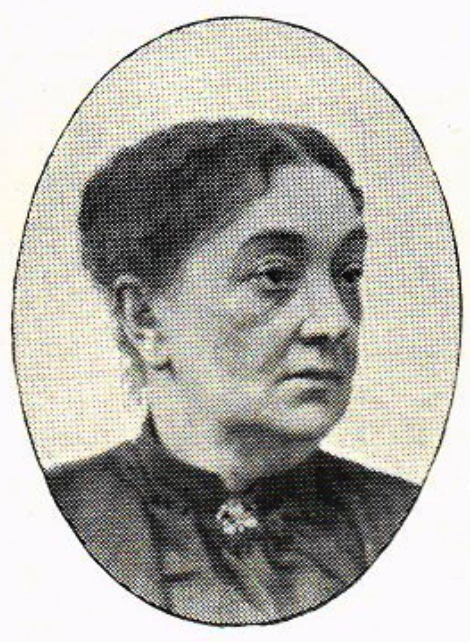
- Sara Pfeiffer
- Born: Sara Christina Wilhelmina; 12 July 1829; Lund, Sweden
- Died: 26 January 1913 (aged 83); Stockholm, Sweden
- Occupation: Writer
- Parents: Carl Gustaf Schönbeck; Sophia Wilhelmina Leche
- Relatives: Carl Johan Pfeiffer

Sara Christina Wilhelmina Apollonia Pfeiffer (12 July 1829 – 26 January 1913) was a Swedish writer.

== Life ==
Sara Pfeiffer was born on 12 July 1829 in Lund, Sweden. She was one of the five children to Carl Gustaf Schönbeck, a municipal doctor, and his wife Sophia Wilhelmina Leche. In 1835, the family moved to Gothenburg, where her father became the chief municipal doctor (stadsläkare). She married Carl Pfeiffer in 1857. Her husband was an agriculturalist who had been serving as a lieutenant in the Prussian army. The couple had two daughters together.

Although Pfeiffer had acquired an interest in writing since her childhood, she was forced to take up a career as an author to overcome the family's financial strain. In 1864, she published her first novel Fosterbarnet. Medaljongen. Tvenne berättleser. under the pen name Sylvia, and followed it up with several novels in the following years. Most of her works encompass entertainment literature and everyday life. Examples include Taflor ur Göteborgslifvet (1867–1869) and Byhistorier från Skåne (1867). She also published several historical novels such as, Furstegunst (1900–1901), which features Swedish countess Magdalena Rudenschöld, the ballet dancer Sophie Hagman, and the stage actress Emilie Högqvist.

Pfeiffer died in Stockholm, on 26 January 1913.
