= Sven G. Svenson =

Swedish historian, banker and writer

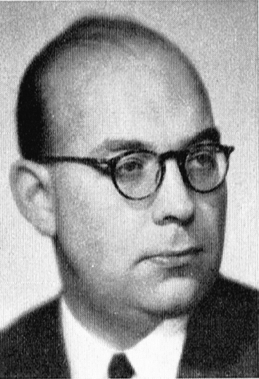
Sven Svenson

Sven Gudmar Svenson (September 29, 1919 in Eskilstuna – February 25, 1997 in Uppsala) was a Swedish historian, banker and writer.

Sven G. Svenson was CEO of Sparfrämjandet 1951-1961 and CEO of Svenska Sparbanksföreningen 1963-1979. He was also Vice Chairman of Tryckeri AB Marieberg, member of Royal Swedish Academy of Engineering Sciences from 1974, member of Royal Gustavus Adolphus Academy from 1975, as well as honorary President of Orphei Drängar.

== Bibliography ==
- 1952 – Gattjinatraktaten 1799: studier i Gustaf IV Adolfs utrikespolitik 1796–1800 (thesis in history)
- 1967 – Mord och lärda mödor (crime fiction book)
- 1982 – sv:Ulf Peder Olrog i Uppsala: några minnen
- 1986 – Gunnar Wennerberg: en biografi
- 1989 – Tre porträtt: skalden Nybom, Curry Treffenberg - en moralist, Hugo Alfvén, i kamp mot ålderdomen
- 1994 – Erland Hjärne: en historikers livsöde
