= Bob Hansson =

Swedish poet and author (born 1970)

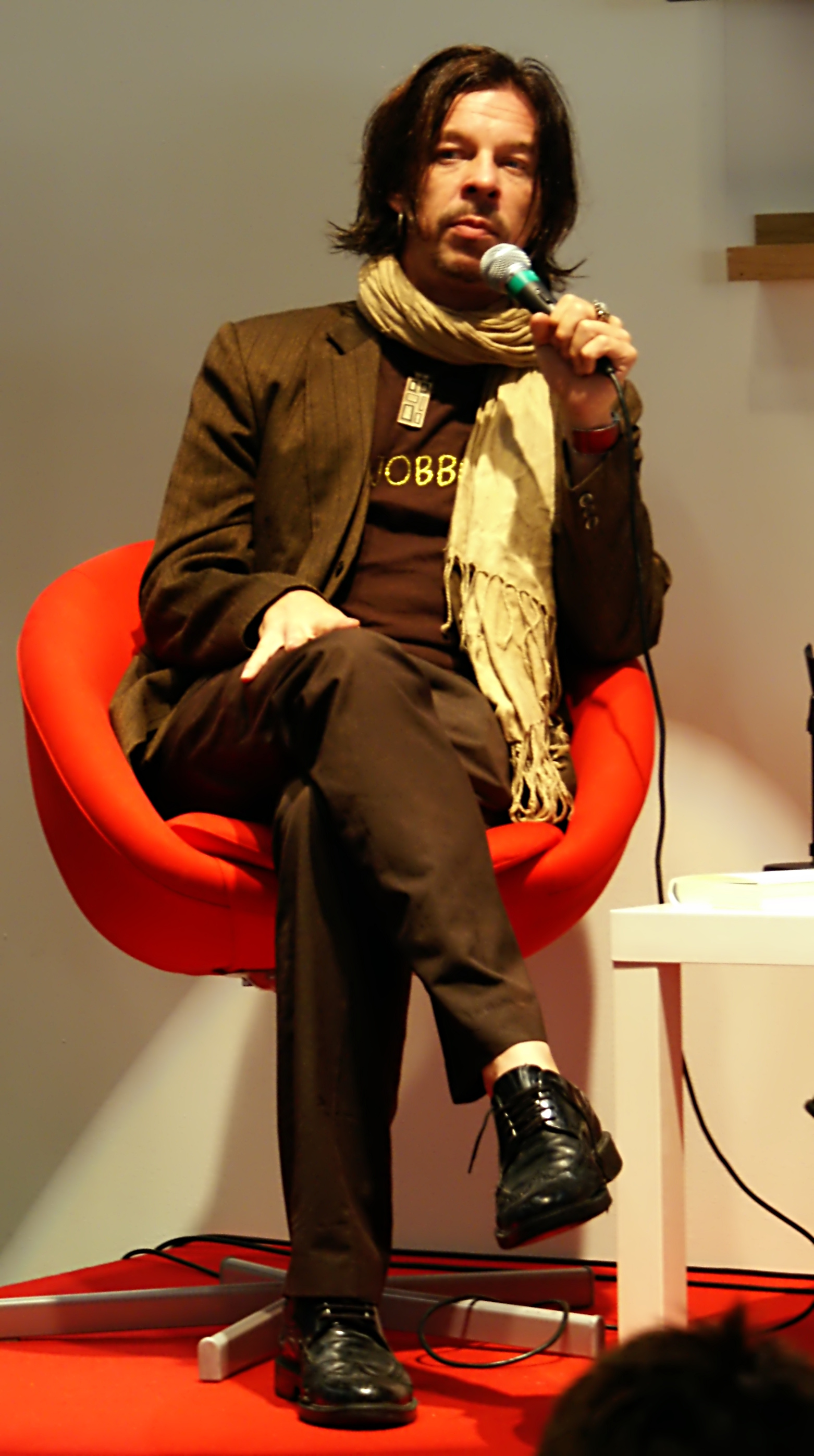
- Hansson in 2008
- Born: 1970 (age 54–55); Helsingborg, Sweden
- Occupation(s): Poet, author

Bob Hansson (born 1970) is a Swedish poet and author.

== Biography ==
Hansson was born in Helsingborg. He won the Swedish championship in poetry slam in 1995 in Falkenberg. He debuted in 1998 with the poetry collection Heja världen!. He has published several poetry collections, novels, made shows and been a panelist in the Sveriges Radio programme Allvarligt talat. In 2003, he released an album with poetry to the music of Fläskkvartetten.

In 2010, Hansson received the Sveriges Radios novellpris for best short story. The same year he was named Yttrandefrihetens hjälte (Hero of the free speech) by ALIS.

== Bibliography ==
- Grupp 94 (antologi, first publish poems) (Gedins förlag 1994) ISBN 91-7964-169-5
- Heja världen!: dikter i urdur (Wahlström & Widstrand, 1998) ISBN 91-46-17199-1
- Lugna puckarnas Mosebok (Wahlström & Widstrand, 2000) ISBN 91-46-17729-9
- Kom över på den här sidan: dikt för dig som föredrar livet (Bromberg, 2000) ISBN 91-7608-824-3
- Här ligger jag och duger (Wahlström & Widstrand, 2001) ISBN 91-46-18176-8
- Bräcklighetens poetik (Wahlström & Widstrand, 2003) ISBN 91-46-20217-X
- Här är vi (Ruin, 2004) ISBN 91-85191-06-X
- Halleluja liksom (Wahlström & Widstrand, 2005) ISBN 91-46-21080-6
- Gunnar (Wahlström & Widstrand, 2007) ISBN 91-46-21725-8
- Kärlek, hur fan gör man? (Wahlström & Widstrand, 2008)
- Cross Water – Möten med broar (Andina Förlag, 2009) by Ewa K. Andinsson
- Vips så blev det liv (Ordfront, 2010)
- Dingo Dingo – Den manliga frigörelsen (2011)
- Det sista vi har är våra kroppar (Ordfront, 2012)

== Discography ==
- Kör solen kör (National 2003)
- Stålmannen är död (Highspeedart 2005)
- Heja världen (Bolero/Sony 2008)
