= Agneta Klingspor =

Swedish author (1946–2022)

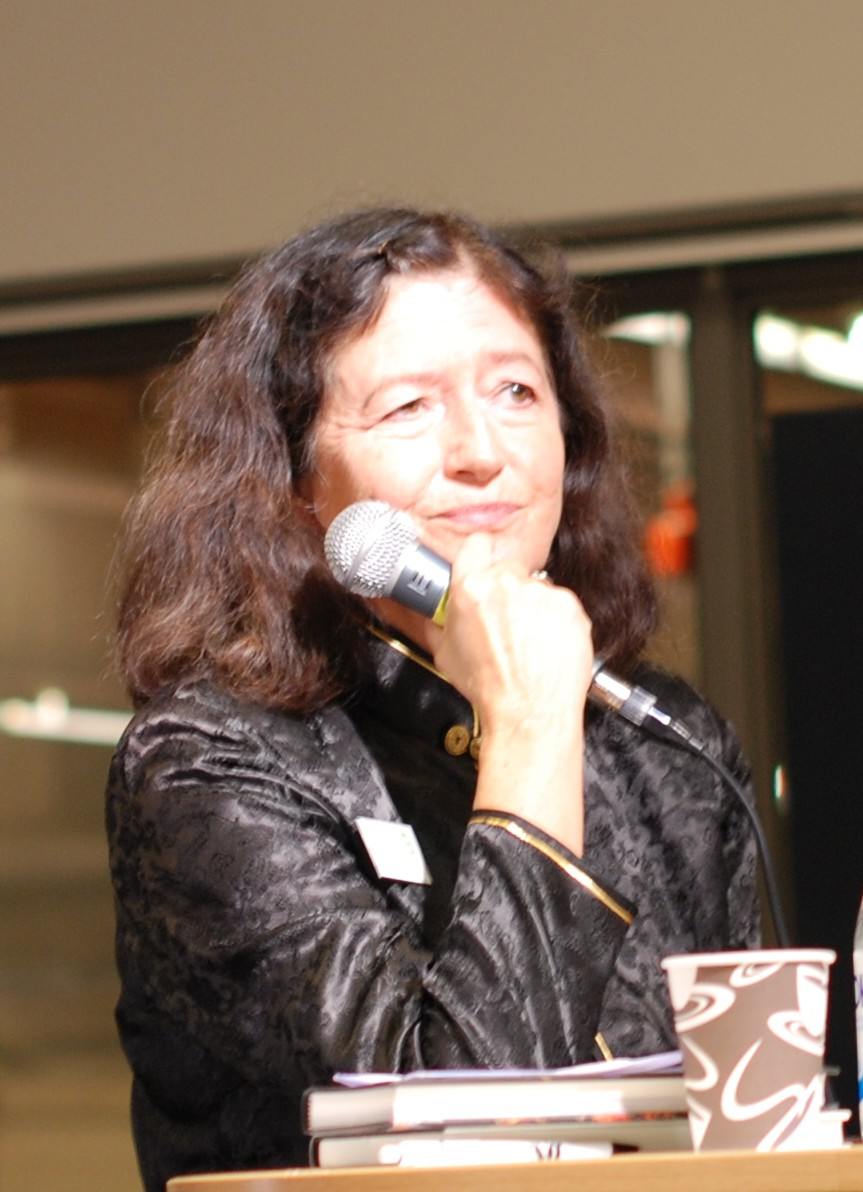
- Klingspor at the Gothenburg Book Fair in 2010
- Born: 4 January 1946; Lysekil, Västra Götaland County, Sweden
- Died: 2 June 2022 (aged 76)
- Notable work: Inte skära bara rispa

Agneta Klingspor (4 January 1946 – 2 June 2022) was a Swedish author. Her literary debut, Inte skära bara rispa, was published during the Swedish feminist movements of 1977, and has been named one of the thousand most classic Swedish novels. She published many other books, and wrote art criticism for Swedish newspapers.

== Early life and education ==
Agneta Klingspor was born in Lysekil on 4 January 1946, and grew up in the Swedish town of Uddevalla, both of which lie inside Västra Götaland County. She has degrees in both literary history and the social sciences.

== Career ==
Her first book, Inte skära bara rispa (English: No Cutting, Just Scratching), was published in 1977. The title stems from a Finnish anecdote of a man threatening a couple in a dark alley with a knife, but who reassuringly says "No cutting! Just some scratching!" The novel relied heavily on her personal journals during the 1960s and 1970s. At the time of publication, she was working in psychiatry. She said in an interview that the popular changes in attitude toward feminism had inspired her to publish the book, and she looked up to the works of women writers Suzanne Brøgger and Erica Jong; she was also inspired by Anaïs Nin. The book made headlines upon release; it was one of the pioneer works in what would be known in Swedish literature as "bekännelselitteratur" (confessional literature) where an author sought to tell the documental truth about his/her life without embellishing or hiding.

The Swedish professor of Literature Ebba Witt-Brattström has stated that Klingspor was a leading voice in the feminist new literary wave that rose to prominence in the 70's.

After Inte skära bara rispa, she published about ten books between 1977 and 1991. The Swedish author Anna-Karin Palm commented that two of these books—Nyckelroman and Framkallning—were particularly meaningful, and that they demonstrated a sense of "sincerity that is not entirely common". After 1991, she turned to writing art criticism for the Swedish major newspaper Expressen and other publications. She wrote other novels after turning to art criticism, and released a collection of photographs in 1997 entitled Minne. She earned grants from the Swedish Academy (2007) and Albert Bonniers Förlag (2008).

"Framkallning" details a daughter's journey into her deceased father's life. Through old letters and photos, the daughter makes a stunning revelation that changes all. The novel raises questions about the truthfulness of memory, and why her and her brother remember the same upbringing so differently.

The cultural critic Cecilia Alstermark wrote in 2013 that Klingspor's writing should be read because of her observational skills; Klingspor wrote variously of her own personal experiences, but also those of migrants, the homeless, in the northern region of Norrland, and in Iran.

== Later life and death ==
She died on 2 June 2022, with her friend Birgitta Holm at her side.
