= Niklas Krog =

Swedish writer

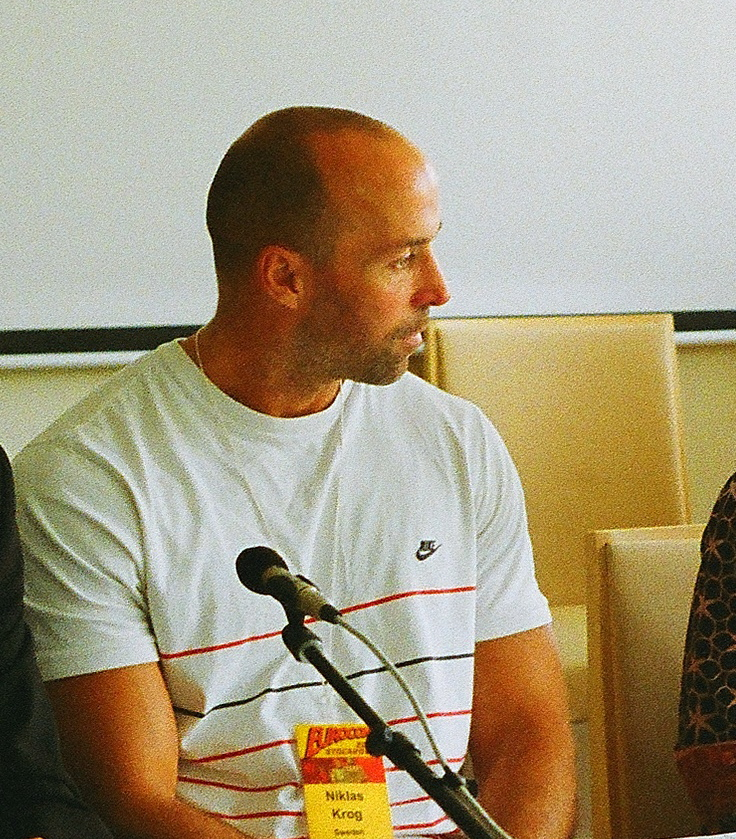
- Niklas Krog at Eurocon in Stockholm 2011.
- Born: Niklas Krog; 1965 (age 60–61); Lund, Sweden
- Occupation: Author
- Writing career
- Notable works: En krigares hjärta, 1997

Niklas Krog is a Swedish author of a number of young-adult novels within the High Fantasy genre.

== Biography ==
Niklas Krog was born in 1965, in Lund, Sweden. He later relocated with his family to Alvik in Stockholm, at the age of eight. In Alvik, Krog joined a local basketball-team and competed in Europe, and his team won several times. Krog had good grades from his highschool, although school never interested him much. Instead he liked sports and continued to play basketball and competed for some time in the Swedish Championship. But eventually Krog chose to quit sports and focus on a literary career. Krog made his debut in 1996 with "Under guds himmel" which literally translates to Beneath the sky of God.

=== Personal life ===
Niklas Krog met his wife, Elizabeth, when he was fourteen years old. They have two children.

== Bibliography ==
=== Trilogin om Frihetskrigen (The Trilogy of the Wars of Peace) ===
1. En krigares hjärta (1997)
2. En magikers styrka (1999)
3. En härskares själ (2001)
4. Den stora fredens krig (2004) - continuation of the Wars of Peace Unadan
5. Tanarog Yxkämpen (2007) - continuation of Unadan's childhood
6. Krigarens väg (2007) - continuation of En krigares hjärta

=== Janus ===
1. Gudarnas son (2000)
2. Till världens ände (2001)
3. Den sista striden (2002)
4. Kampen om tronen (2006)

=== Yumi och den magiska världen Loophole ===
1. Loophole: Drakmagi och saftsmugglare (2004)
2. Loophole - Magiväktare och sköldpaddspirater (2006)

=== Trilogin om Biko - Krigare utan minne (The Trilogy of Biko - Warrior without memory) ===
1. Krigare utan minne (2008)
2. I krigarens spår (2010)
3. Krigarens sista strid (2010)

=== Turk and Ayla ===
- Ingen rädsla (2008)
- Turk & Ayla (2010)
- Turk & Ayla - Sista skottet (2011)
- Turk & Timotej, En natt (2012)

=== Legenden om Tann (The Legend of Tann) ===
1. Legenden om Tann - Skogsflickan (2010)
2. Legenden om Tann - Bestens håla (2010)
3. Legenden om Tann - Drakmötet (2011)
4. Legenden om Tann - Nidaros vrede (2011)
5. Legenden om Tann - Dräparen (2012)
6. Legenden om Tann - Havet (2012)

=== Easy-reading fantasy ===
- Draksvärdet (2000)
- Häxmästarens skugga (2003) - continuation of Draksvärdet
- Det mystiska skeppet (2005)
- Det magiska molnet (2007) - continuation of Det mystiska skeppet

=== Others ===
- Under Guds himmel (1996)
- Jor & Ka (1998)
- Den röda planeten (2000)
