= Eva Billow =

Swedish illustrator, cartoonist and children's writer

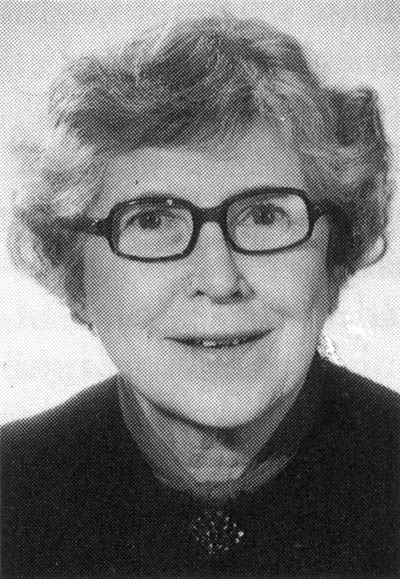
Eva Billow (1950s)

Eva Hildegard Maria Billow née Forss (1902–1993) was an influential Swedish illustrator, cartoonist and children's writer. She is remembered for writing and illustrating rhyming Swedish children's stories, including Pojkarna Igelkotts vinterskor (1948) and Nickes lediga dag (1950). They depict everyday life in a playful, humorous style, often with animals as the principal characters. Her poetry collections are inspired by children in the home environment, sometimes depicted as animals, sometimes as human beings.

== Biography ==
Born on 2 May 1902 in Övre Ullered, Värmland, in west central Sweden, Eva Hildegard Maria Forss was the youngest child of the factory owner and agronomist, Johan Albin Forss and Gerda Ingeborg Tereseia née Kjellmark. After completing her school education, she attended the Technical School in Stockholm where she trained as a drawing instructor and advertising artist. She remained at the school teaching calligraphy from 1925 to 1968. In parallel, in 1925 she became an illustrator for Svenska Journalen, creating the children's series Kajsa och Snurran with rhyming text, published in book form in 1929.

She became particularly productive and creative from the late 1940s, initially with Pojkarna Igelkotts vinterskor, a picture book for small children about a family of hedgehogs with other characters as animals, birds and insects. Her playful rhyming children's stories about everyday life continued in När John Blund försov sig (1949), and Nickes lediga dag (1950). Her poetry was published in Godmorgon och godnatt (1951). In 1949, she illustrated Astrid Lindgren's short story series Nils Karlsson-Pyssling.

Thanks to her innovative styles, Svensk Bokkonst selected her works as Årets utvalda böcker (books of the year) in 1946, 1948, 1949 and 1950.

Eva Billow died in Stockholm on 22 February 1993.
