= Sara Kristoffersson =

Swedish professor

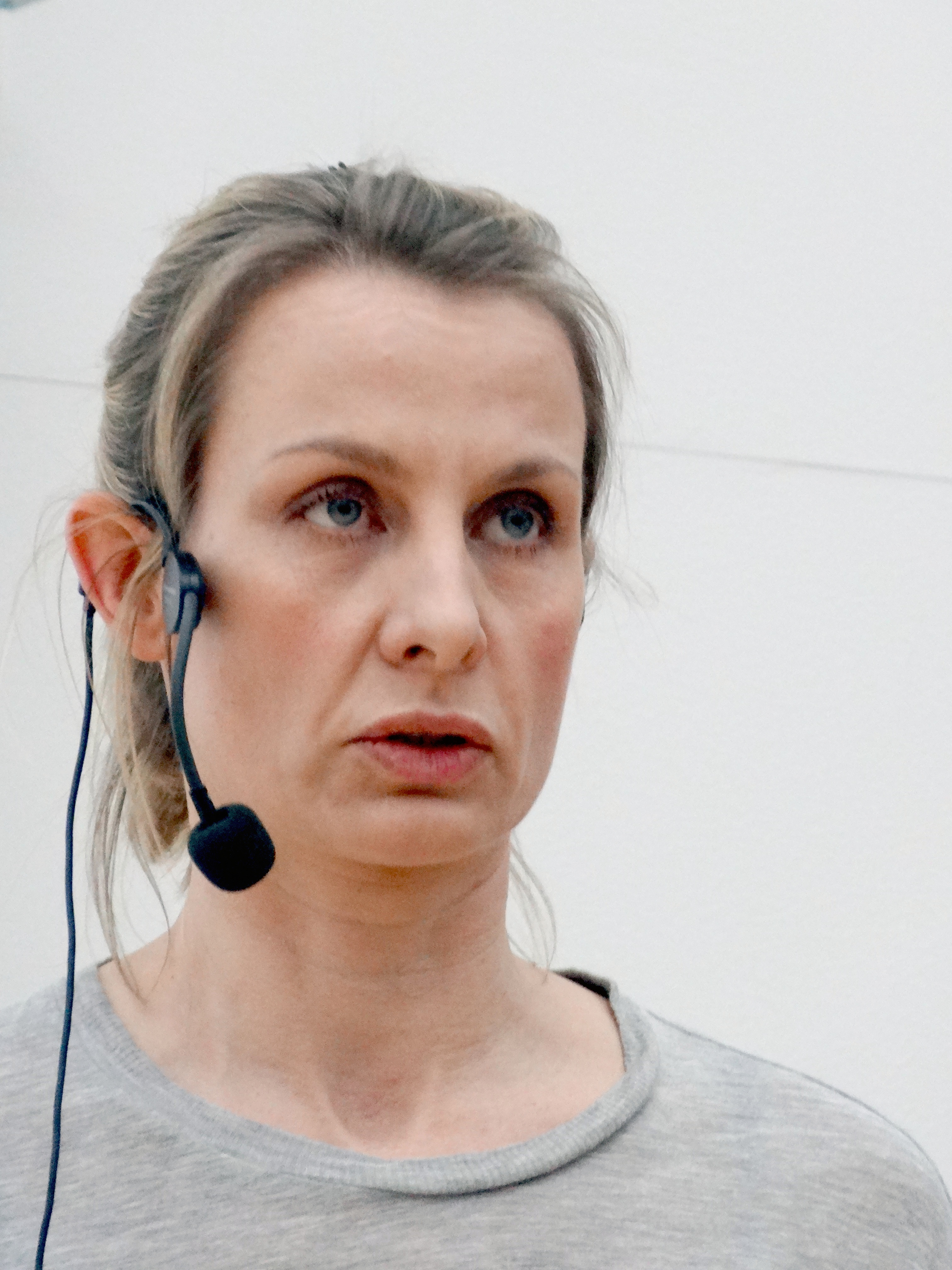
Sara Kristoffersson

Sara Kristoffersson was born in Stockholm 1972 and is a Swedish writer and professor of design history and theory at Konstfack University College of Arts, Crafts and Design in Stockholm. She is the author of several exhibition catalogue essays and has published a number of articles on various aspects of design, architecture and popular culture.

Kristoffersson received her Ph.D. in art history and visual studies from the University of Gothenburg in 2003 (Memphis and the Anti-Design Movement). During the 1990s she was a partner at Ynglingagatan 1 (Y1) – an alternative art space in Stockholm. An exhibition about the gallery was shown at the Museum of Modern Art in Stockholm in 2011–2012. She has presented research and lectures internationally at institutions including École nationale supérieure des arts décoratifs, Paris, France; Parsons School of Design, New York, USA; the Royal Swedish Academy of Fine Arts, Stockholm, Sweden; Copenhagen Business School, Copenhagen, Denmark; Humboldt-Universität, Berlin, Germany.

Her book Design by IKEA. A Cultural History (Bloomsbury Publishing, 2014) discussing the IKEA project, focusing on the 1980s and 1990s, when the company's symbolic connection to Sweden was constructed and expressed in various ways. The ongoing commercial success has been founded on the rather neat alignment of the brand with a particular image of Swedish national identity.

== Bibliography ==
- Memphis och den italienska antidesignrörelsen, University of Gothenburg, 2003.
- Når alt er design, National Touring Exhibitions, Oslo, Norway, 2005 (utställningskatalog)
- På modet – ny svensk kläddesign, Dunkers kulturhus, Helsingborg, 2005 (utställningskatalog)
- Design: Stockholm, Stockholms stadsmuseum, Stockholm, 2005 (utställningskatalog)
- Mönsterkraft, Dunkers kulturhus, Helsingborg, 2010 (utställningskatalog)
