= Maria Ernestam =

Swedish author and journalist

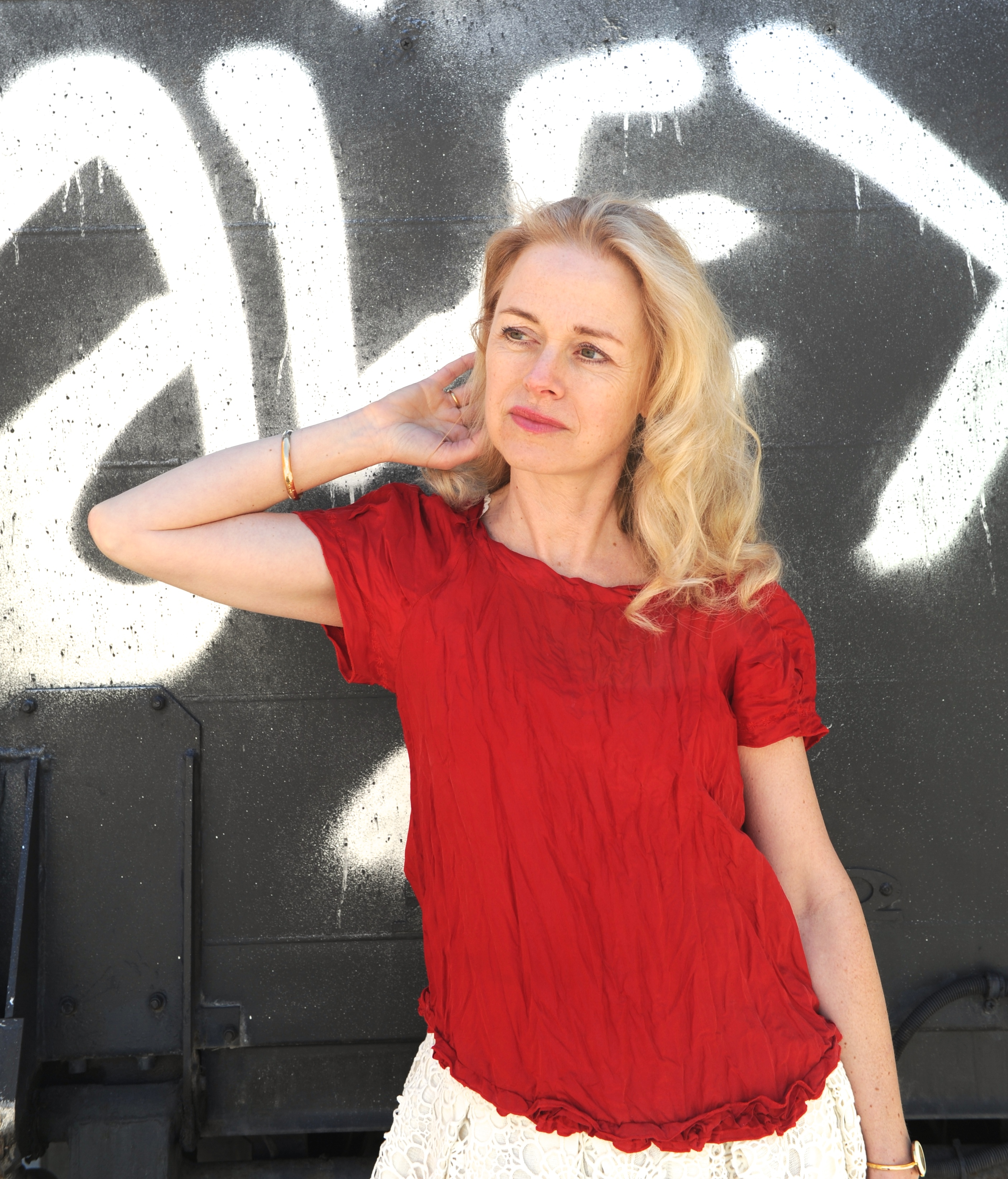
- Born: Anna Maria Ernestam; 28 November 1959 (age 66); Uppsala, Sweden
- Occupation: Writer
- Writing career
- Genre: Dramatic novels
- Notable works: The Wounded Pianist; An Eye for an Eye, and a Paw for a Paw; Daughter's of the Marionettes; Caipirinha with Death; Buster's Ears; Cleopatra's comb Always with you On the other side of the Sun
- Website: mariaernestam.com/en/

Maria Ernestam (born 28 November 1959) is a Swedish author and journalist.

== Life and career ==
Ernestam grew up in Uppsala, Sweden. She is a journalist, having earned her journalism degree at the University of Gothenburg. In addition, Ernestam studied English literature and mathematics at the University of Uppsala. Ernestam also studied in the United States, where she took a Master of Arts in political science, focusing on international relations, at the University of Kansas. She then moved to Germany, where she stayed for eleven years in Frankfurt am Main, as a correspondent for the Swedish business weekly Veckans affärer and Swedish medical weekly Dagens medicin.

In 2005, Maria Ernestam had her first novel published, "Caipirinha with Death" (Caipirinha med Döden). It tells a tale of Death knocking at the wrong door and meeting a woman who starts working for him. In Russia the book was compared to Mikhail Bulgakov's "The Master and Margarita". Since then Ernestam has written seven more novels and contributed to anthologies and short-story selections. Ernestam lives in Stockholm with her husband and two children.

== Authorship ==
Maria Ernestam's books have been described as dramatic psychological relationship novels spiced with twists and drastic humor. The books have been sold to 13 countries and reached top list placements in Germany and Taiwan. More than half a million copies have been sold.

== Prizes and awards ==
In France, Maria Ernestam received the booksellers' prize Prix Page des Libraires for Buster's Ears (Busters öron). The same book received the French awards Prix La Passerelle and Prix de l'Armitière. Ernestam's French translator Esther Sermage was awarded the prize for best translation of foreign literature into French for "Buster's Ears". She received the prize at Lire en Poche in Gradignan. Always with you (Alltid hos dig) was nominated for the Prix Littéraire Cezan Inter-CE and for the Stora Läsarpriset (The grand Readers' prize).

== Selected works ==
- 2016 – The Wounded Pianist (Den sårade pianisten). Novel
- 2014 – An Eye for and Eye, and a Paw for a Paw (Öga för öga, tass för tass). Novel
- 2012 – Daughter's of the Marionettes (Marionetternas döttrar). Novel
- 2010 – On the Other Side of the Sun (På andra sidan solen). Novel
- 2010 – Drama Queens. Selection of short stories
- 2009 – My Grandmother's Story (Min mormors historia). Anthology
- 2008 – Always With You (Alltid hos dig). Novel
- 2007 – Cleopatra's Comb (Kleopatras kam). Novel
- 2006 – Buster's Ears (Busters öron). Novel
- 2005 – Caipirinha with Death (Caipirinha med Döden). Novel

== Sources ==
- Månpocket (12-10-10)
- Forum (26 04 10)
- UNT/Kultur (26 04 10)
- Grand agency (04 10 12)
- Bokia (04 10 12)
- Official web site (24 11 15)
