= Elisabeth Kuylenstierna-Wenster =

Swedish translator and writer

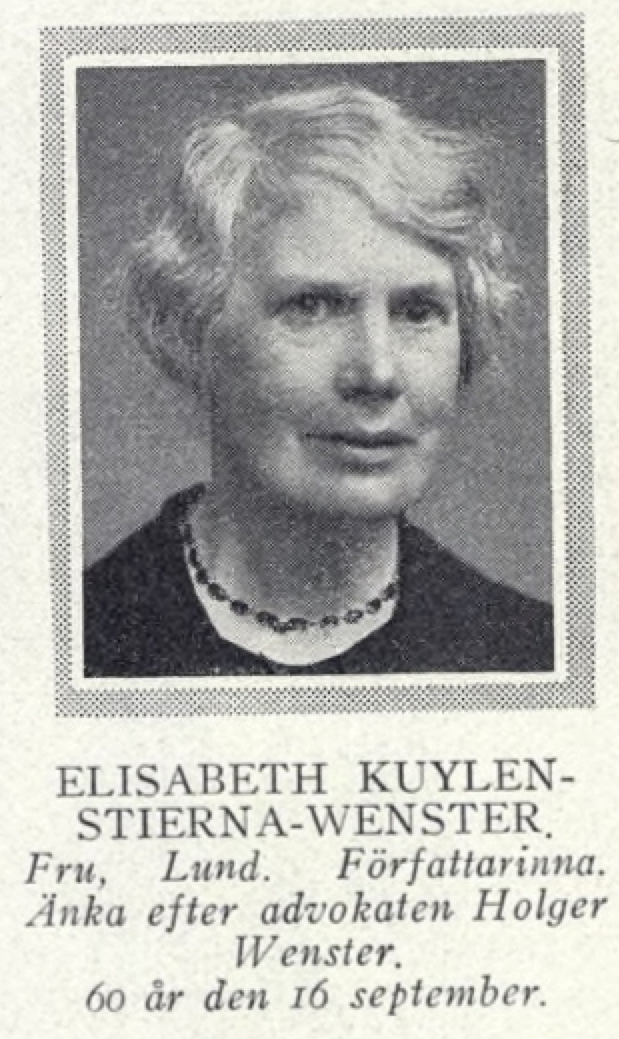
- Born: Elisabeth Kuylenstierna; 16 September 1869; Nacka, Sweden
- Died: 13 February 1933 (aged 63); Lund, Sweden
- Resting place: St. Paul's Church, Malmö
- Occupations: writer; translator; lecturer
- Spouse: Holger Wenster
- Writing career
- Pen name: Sten Wide; EKW
- Genres: societal critique; history; short stories; children

Marie Elisabeth Kuylenstierna-Wenster (16 September 1869 – 13 February 1933) was a Swedish translator and writer, often writing under the pseudonym Sten Wide or using her initials EKW. She studied in France, Germany, and Denmark and wrote for several magazines in the period 1886–1913. She then became a French teacher and was a common lecturer at the municipality before she became a popular science lecturer in Lund.

Elisabeth Keylenstierna-Wenster was known both as a lecturer and a critic on literature, and published over ten collections of short stories, over 20 children's books, and around 50 novels concerning contemporary societal critique and historical novels. She translated around 70 novels, mainly from Danish.
