= Stefan Hammarén =

Finnish author

Stefan Hammarén is a Finnish author who writes in Swedish, belonging to the Swedish-speaking minority of the country. He is the leading Scandinavian surrealist author, language anarchist, poet and text technician. He cannot be placed in any literary tradition, but his novels have recurring aspects of puns and wordplay, dadaistic eagerness and literary puzzles, and contain erotic digressions. His texts are extremely verbose with few visible threads, let alone plot or characterization, and have a distinct embellishment in a baroque pattern, partly with a Shakespearean solemnity. They resemble Joyce's verbal virtuosities in Finnegans Wake.

Hammarén's "Sopptrilogi" ("Soup Can Trilogy", 2001–2005) deals with the saucepan-land colonization, in which ingredients and constituents are plentiful. The trilogy's first novel was published in 2001 and called "Med en burk soppa", it was continued by "Konservöppnare bok" in 2003 and finally "På burklös mark" in 2005. His novel "Loserförfattarfabriken" (the station for loser authors) is a satire, making the authors culture a dream for citizens, whose backside they do not understand the hell themselves. All his fictional production is published by small-scale publisher "h:ström - Text & Kultur" of Umeå, Sweden.

Hammarén has also written poems, dramas, short stories and a translation and free interpretation of Guy de Maupassant's "Horla", amongst others. His Le Horla translation being unfaithful to the French original, it aroused the ire of noted Swede critic Carl Rudbeck in the Dagens Nyheter. An opposing view soon appeared in the Svenska Dagbladet.

== Bibliography ==
- Med en burk soppa (2001)
- konservöppnare bok (2003)
- På solfläckens barnhem (2003) (collection of poems)
- Fluga diversé (2004)
- Horla (2004)
- På burklös mark (2005)
- Melåhner o smörgromskrasse (2007) (collection of poems)
- 1, 2 (2009) (collection of poems, with Emma Ehrlekrona)
- Hydrolith: Surrealist Research & Investigations, Hydrolith Editorial Collective 2010 (in a surreal anthology)
- S:t Största skarabéerboken (2010)
- Tredje generation skarabéerbok (2012)
- Första skarabéerboken (2012)
- Flickan fr. spikregnet (2014)
- Loserförfattarfabriken (2017)
- Jordklotsmörkt, lakrits, Ars Interpres Publication 2021 (diktsvit som diptyk, N:r XVIII-XIX i "Pamphilus" skriftserie)
- Grand Hotel Metaphysik + tëxter, utg Ars Interpres Publication 2022 (fri prosalyrisk konstruktion på basen av Hugo Balls texter)
- XXX, Ars Interpres Publication 2025
