= Camilla Ceder =

Swedish writer

Camilla Ceder (born 1976) is a Swedish writer specializing in crime fiction.

She studied social science and psychotherapy and worked as a counsellor and social worker. She lives in Gothenburg, the setting for her novels.

== Selected works ==
- Fruset ögonblick (2008), translated as Frozen moment (2010)
- Babylon (2010), translated in 2012
