= Adèle Weman =

Finnish writer and educator

Adéle Weman
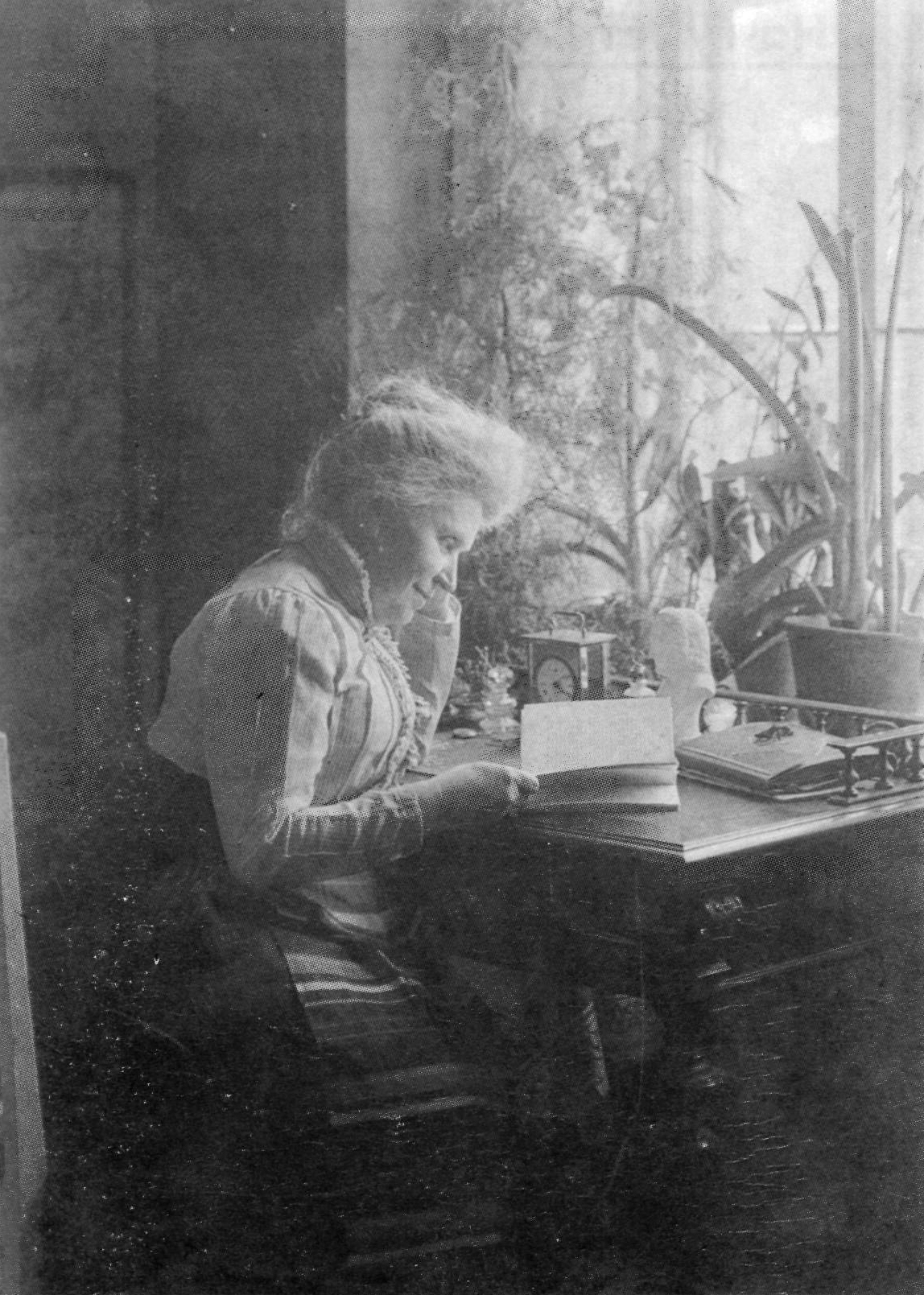
- Born: October 7, 1844; Valkeala, Finland
- Died: September 1, 1936 (aged 91); Kimito, Finland
- Writing career
- Genres: Folk tale, novel, children's literature, poetry, theatre

Adèle Wilhelmina Weman (October 7, 1844 – September 10, 1936) was a Finnish writer and educator. She wrote in Swedish under the pen names Parus Ater, Inga Storm and Zakarias. She was a pioneer in the fields of youth education and the development of youth associations.

The daughter of Johan Wilhelm Weman, a land surveyor, and Carolina Wilhelmina Granbohm, she was born in Valkeala. In 1882, she began teaching at the college in Kimito and she retired from teaching in 1917.

Her first children's book Efter lexan följer leken: berättelser och lekar was published in Swedish in 1884 under the name Parus Ater. It was followed by Barnafröjd: versifierade lekar och berättelser in 1899. She also wrote for various newspapers and magazines and published plays and poetry.

Weman died in Kimito at the age of 91.

Her former home Villa Sagalund is preserved as part of the Sagalunds museum.

Parus ater is the former Latin name for the coal tit, now called Periparus ater.

== Publications ==
- Mikko Ljung (1880)
- En byhistorie, folk stories (as Parus Ater) (1883)
- I Wiborgs gränd (1883)
- Efter lexan följer leken(1884)
- Ett löfte (1884)
- På landsbygden, folk stories (as Parus Ater) (1885)
- Uppåt eller nedåt?, novel (as Inge Storm) (1890)
- Toner från bygden (1898)
- Barnafröjd (1899)
- Giftermålsbyrån och andra dikter (1900)
- Hos spåguinman (1902)
- Lump-Lenas testamente (1902)
- Från loft och logar (1909)
- Bylåtar och strängaspel (1911)
- Läsförhörskalaset på Hultnäs (1914)
- Kung Ivars dotter (1915)
- Vinterdrömmar (1915)
- Dalakastet (1917)
- Från mormors tid (1917)
- I trolldoms garn (1917)
- Valda dikter (1917)
- Ur barnens lustgård (1918)
- Aftonklockan (1919)
- Gäckat hopp (1919)
- Stackars Margit (1919)
- Förtroliga stunder (1921)
- Stämningsstunder (1925)
- I daggryningen (1927)
- Trollborgen (1930)
- Lilla Maja (1931)
- Minnen i skuggor och dagrar (1933)
