= Paulina Westdahl =

Swedish author (1810–1887)

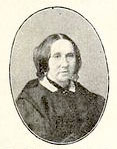
- Born: 24 March 1810; Jönköping, Sweden
- Died: 7 August 1887 (aged 77); Stockholm, Sweden
- Occupation: Writer

Eleonora Polynetta (Pauline) Emilia Westdahl, (24 March 1810 – 7 August 1887) was a Swedish writer and pioneer within the Swedish awakening movement and temperance activist. Westdahl published her novel Rosor och törnen (Roses and thorns), in 1873, and also wrote a book on sobriety and a children's fairytale.

== Biography ==
Eleonora Polynetta Emilia was born 24 March 1810. Her father was the duke Polycarpus Cronhielm (1774–1810) and her mother Anna Margareta Maria Edenhielm and she had five siblings. Her father was Master of the Chase. The year she was born, both parents died and Pauline was raised by relatives in Gothenburg and in Jönköping. She was given a comprehensive education in literature and languages. While living in Jönköping Westdahl came to know the journalist Wendela Hebbe, with whom she maintained a correspondence for the rest of her life.

From 1825, Pauline resided in Jönköping and married a vicar named Carl Magnus Westdahl in 1835. They had six children. Both Westdahls led the great awakening in the 1840's in Jönköping, and started the sobriety movements with Pauline Westdahl as manager for the Bible study group created by the United Bible Societies.

In 1848, her husband became the vicar of Karlshamn and Asarum. After his death in 1865, Westdahl lived in Stockholm as a vicar's widow with a yearly pension of 200 (SEK). To make a living, she had to rent out rooms, and translated articles for, and wrote, for local newspapers. She released her first novel, Rosor och törnen (Roses and thorns), in 1873 at the age of 63. Earlier, she had published a book on sobriety and the hurtful nature of alcohol. She also wrote a children's fairytale, called Ett treblad för julen.

== Bibliography ==
- Drinkaren och hans dotter: Nykterhets-och folkskrift tillegnad i synnerhet mina landsmanninnor i hyddan, af en svensk medborgarinna, (The drunkard and his daughter: A sobering and popular book dedicated especially to my fellow countrywomen in the hut, by a Swedish citizen) 1841.
- Rebeckas nej: Nykterhets-och folkskrift, tillegnad i synnerhet Smålands ungdom af förf. till "Drinkaren och hans dotter", 1843
- Rosor och törnen: svenskt original, 1873
- De fyra önskningarne: berättelse, (The four wishes: story) 1873
- Margareta Kling eller En ros vid vägen (Margareta Kling or A rose by the road), 1875
- Ett treblad för julen (A tree leaf for Christmas), 1882
- De sörjandes vän: Några trösteord utgifna trettio år efter författarinnans död af Ellen Tretow, född Westdahl (Friend of the bereaved: Some words of comfort published thirty years after the author's death by Ellen Tretow, née Westdahl), 1925
