= Albert Olsson (writer) =

Swedish writer (1904–1994)

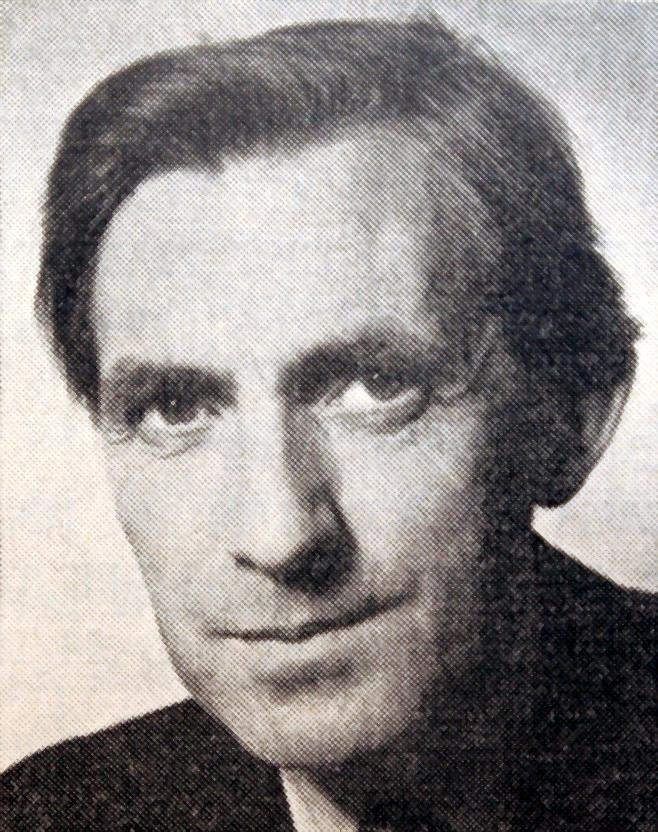
Albert Olsson

Albert Olsson (1904 in Eslöv – 1994) was a Swedish writer and elementary school teacher. For most of his life he lived in Harplinge in the county of Halland, where he worked as a teacher, after graduating in 1924. He is mostly known for his novel trilogy about the farmer Tore Gudmarsson, published in the early 1940s and set in Halland in the 17th century, during the time when Halland switched hands from Denmark to Sweden.

== Selected bibliography ==
From 1928 to 1985, Olsson penned some 46 novels, including the Tore Gudmarsson trilogy of romantic novels:

- 1940 – Sand
- 1942 – Gränsland
- 1945 – Tore Gudmarsson

and in 1947 Den nye (tr. The New), a romance, which was made into the film När kärleken kom till byn in 1950.

All of these were published by Tiden of Stockholm; some of his later works (from 1964 onwards) were published by Allhem, Malmö, then Spektra, Halmstad, and Settern, initially at Laholm then Örkelljunga.

== Prizes and awards ==
Olsson was awarded the ABF:s litteratur- & konststipendium award in 1950, one of the Boklotteriets stipendiater awards in 1954, and the Handelsanställdas förbunds pris ("Trade Unions' federal prize") for his book Makt och fattigdom (tr. Power and Poverty). in 1962.
