= Birgitta Holm (author) =

Swedish writer (born 1936)

- Born: June 4, 1936 (age 90); Stockholm, Sweden
- Title: Professor emerita of literary studies at Uppsala University

Academic background
- Education: Stockholm University (1959)
- Website: www.pardans.nu

Astrid Birgitta Holm (born 4 June 1936) is a Swedish author and professor emerita in literary studies at Uppsala University.

== Early life ==
Holm was born in Stockholm.

== Awards ==
- 2002 - Lotten von Kræmer's Prize
- 2004 - Schückska Prize
- 2006 - Moa Prize (Moa Martinson Scholarship)
- 2020 - The Mårbacka Prize

== Personal life ==
She was a friend of the author Agneta Klingspor, and was at her side when she died in June 2022.
