= Charlotta Falkman =

Swedish-Finnish author

Ulrica Charlotta Falkman (1795–1882), was a Swedish-Finnish novelist.

Falkman was born in Sweden to the Swedish Lieutenant Isaac Otto Falkman (1761–1817) and Maria Elisabeth Govenia. While Falkman was a child, her mother moved with her to Helsinki.

An educated woman who spoke French, Swedish and Finnish, Falkman was described as refined, accomplished and with a polished manner. She worked as a governess until hearing loss led her to take up sewing and, finally, writing. Falkman never became wealthy, but lived as a lodger in the homes of wealthy families in Helsinki. She never married and had no children. Falkman spent her last years in a home for the terminally ill.

Falkman's novels were published both in Finnish magazines and in book form. While she wrote her novels in Swedish, then the language of the contemporary Finnish elite, Falkman belongs to the pioneer novelists as well as female novelists in Finland. Her novels described the contemporary lives for women in the Swedish-Finnish elite as well the hardships of the laboring classes.

== Works ==
- En prestgård i N-d, af en finsk medborgarinna. Johanna Cederwaller & Son, Wiborg 1847
- Nyårsafton. Original af U-a. A. F. Cederwallers förlag, Wiborg 1848
- Leonna, en skildring ur lifvet. J. W. Lillja, Åbo 1854
- Frimurarens Fosterson : en tidsbild från 18:e seklet. G. W. Edlund, Helsingfors 1864
