= List of Swedish women writers =

This is a list of women writers who were born in Sweden or whose writings are closely associated with the country.

== A ==
- Sophie Adlersparre (1823–1895), journalist, editor, women's rights activist
- Charlotte Agell (born 1959), English-language works for children and young adults
- Catharina Ahlgren (1734–1800)
- Astrid Ahnfelt (1876–1962), writer, translator and editor, fostered cultural relations between Sweden and Italy
- Sonja Åkesson (1926–1977), poet, dramatist
- Susanna Alakoski (born 1962), Finnish-born author now in Sweden, novelist, author of Svinalängorna filmed as Beyond
- Eva Alexanderson (1911–1994), novelist, translator, publisher
- Elsa Alkman (1878–1975), suffragist, women's rights activist, writer and composer
- Gunila Ambjörnsson (1938–2013), novelist, playwright, screenwriter
- Barbro Alving (1909–1987), journalist, feminist, screenwriter
- Fanny Alving (1874–1955), journalist, novelist
- Karin Alvtegen (born 1965), crime fiction writer, some works now in English
- Lena Anderson (born 1939), children's writer and illustrator
- Pamela Andersson (born 1965), journalist
- Stina Aronson (1892–1956), novelist, her Hitom himlen features women in the farms of northern Sweden
- Suzanne Axell (born 1955), journalist, television presenter
- Majgull Axelsson (born 1947), journalist, best-selling novelist

== B ==
- Victoria Benedictsson (1850–1888), realist novelist
- Anne-Marie Berglund (1952–2020), poet, novelist, short story writer
- Elisabeth Bergstrand-Poulsen (1887–1955), writer, artist, illustrator
- Gunilla Bergström (1942–2021), journalist, widely translated children's author, creator of Alfie Atkins (Alfons Aberg)
- Charlotta Berger (1784–1852)
- Elsa Beskow (1874–1953), children's writer, novelist, illustrator
- Eva Billow (1902–1993), writer and illustrator of children's literature
- Margareta Birgersdotter Grip (1538–1586), genealogist, early documentalist
- Elsa Björkman-Goldschmidt (1888–1982), writer and lithographer
- Ellen-Sylvia Blind (1925–2009), Swedish Sami writer
- Louise Boije af Gennäs (born 1961), novelist, feminist, co-creator of Swedish soap opera Rederiet
- Sophie Bolander (1807–1869)
- Hilma Borelius (1869–1932), literary historian, academic and suffragist
- Karin Boye (1900–1941), novelist, poet, Swedes know her poems by heart
- Eva Brag (1829–1913), novelist, poet, journalist
- Agnes Branting (1862–1930), textile artist and writer
- Fredrika Bremer (1801–1865), novelist, feminist writer
- Irja Agnes Browallius (1901–1968), teacher, novelist, short story writer
- Annika Bryn (born 1945), journalist, short story writer, crime-fiction author
- Maj Bylock (1931–2019), children's writer, translator, teacher

== C ==
- Gunnel Carlson (born 1956), gardening journalist, author, television presenter
- Charlotte Cecilia af Tibell (1820–1901), author, hymn writer
- Siv Cedering (1939–2007), children's writer, poet, writes in both English and Swedish
- Sigrid Combüchen (born 1942), novelist, essayist, journalist, critic, author of Byron (1988)

== D ==
- Tora Dahl (1886–1982), novelist, teacher, gained fame with her autobiographic Fosterbarn (Foster Child) in 1954

== E ==
- Inger Edelfeldt (born 1956), novelist, short story writer, children's writer, illustrator
- Cordelia Edvardson (1929–2012), memoirist and poet
- Brita Egardt (1916–1990), ethnologist and folklorist
- Lena Einhorn (born 1954), director, writer and physician
- Hedda Ekman (1860–1929), writer and photographer
- Kerstin Ekman (born 1933), novelist, detective story writer, several English translations
- Margareta Ekström (1930–2021), poet, novelist, children's writer, critic
- Elaine Eksvärd (born 1981), non-fiction writer specializing in rhetoric
- Sigrid Elmblad (1860–1926), journalist, poet, translator and writer.
- Helena Eriksson (born 1962), expressionist poet, author of Strata
- Maria Ernestam (born 1959), journalist, widely translated novelist

== F ==
- Charlotta Falkman (1795–1882), novelist
- Phebe Fjellström (1924–2007), ethnologist
- Emilie Flygare-Carlén (1807–1892), novelist
- Maja Forsslund (1878–1967), folklorist and local historian
- Tua Forsström (born 1947), highly acclaimed Swedish-language poet, widely translated, author of Efter att ha tillbringat en natt bland hästar (After Spending a Night among Horses)
- Marianne Fredriksson (1927–2007), journalist, novelist, most works translated into English
- Inger Frimansson (born 1944), crime fiction writer, children's writer, journalist
- Katarina Frostenson (born 1953), one of Sweden's foremost poets since the 1980s

== G ==
- Christina Garsten (born 1962), social anthropologist, non-fiction writer
- Wilhelmina Gravallius (1809–1884)
- Caroline Giertz (born 1958), writer and TV presenter
- Elsa Grave (1918–2003), novelist, poet, artist
- Maria Gripe (1923–2007), children's writer
- Abela Gullbransson (1775–1822), revivalist writer
- Madeleine Gustafsson (born 1937), poet, critic, translator

== H ==
- Anna Hamilton Geete (1848–1913), translator, biographer
- Carola Hansson (born 1942), novelist, translator
- Gunnel Hazelius-Berg (1905–1997), museum curator and writer, specializing in textiles and folk costumes
- Barbro Hedvall (born 1944), journalist, non-fiction writer
- Marie Hermanson (born 1956), thriller writer, author of The Devil's Sanctuary
- Rut Hillarp (1914–2003), modernist poet evoking sexual relationships in a man's world
- Sara Holmsten (1713–1795), memoirist
- Karin Hübinette (born 1966), journalist, television presenter

== I ==
- Ulla Isaksson (1916–2000), novelist, short story writer, screenwriter, caused controversy among feminists with Paradistorg (Paradise Place, 1973)

== J ==
- Ann Jäderlund (born 1955), poet, playwright, children's writer
- Ann Henning Jocelyn, (born 1948), writer, playwright and translator
- Klara Johanson (1875–1948), literary critic, essayist, translator
- Majken Johansson (1930–1993), now regarded as one of Sweden's greatest mid-20th century poets
- Molly Johnson (1931–2018), novelist, known for Pansarkryssaren
- Mari Jungstedt (born 1962), popular crime fiction writer, journalist, translated 15 languages including English

== K ==
- Mare Kandre (1962–2005), novelist, short story writer, several works translated into English
- Marit Kapla (born 1970), writer, journalist
- Kristina Kappelin (born 1958), journalist, columnist, non-fiction writer
- Amanda Kerfstedt (1835–1920), novelist, playwright, translator
- Ellen Key (1849–1926), feminist writer, advocate of child-centred education
- Elisabet Kjellberg (1821–1914), publicist, editor, and author
- Ellen Kleman (1867–1943), novelist, journal editor, women's rights activist
- Linde Klinckowström-von Rosen (1920–2000), columnist, letter writer, non-fiction writer
- Sophie von Knorring (1797–1848), pioneer of the realistic novel in Sweden
- Thekla Knös (1815–1880)
- Anja Kontor (born 1964), journalist, television presenter
- Elisabeth Krey-Lange (1878–1965), journalist and women's rights activist
- Agnes von Krusenstjerna (1894–1940), novelist, short story writer, often causing controversy with accounts of sexual intercourse
- Annette Kullenberg (1939–2021), journalist, novelist, playwright

== L ==
- Camilla Läckberg (born 1974), best-seller crime writer, translated into 33 languages
- Anna Laestadius Larsson (born 1966), historical novelist
- Ann-Helén Laestadius (born 1971), Sami journalist and children's novelist, writing in Swedish
- Charlotta Lagerberg Thunes (born 1972), children's book author and behavioral scientist
- Selma Lagerlöf (1858–1940), children's writer, novelist, Nobel prize winner
- Dagmar Lange (1914–1991), successful crime fiction writer under the pen name Maria Lang
- Viveca Lärn (born 1944), journalist, children's writer
- Åsa Larsson (born 1966), crime fiction writer
- Lisbeth Larsson (1949–2021), literary historian focusing on gender studies
- Zenia Larsson (1922–2007), writer and sculptor, one of the first Holocaust survivors in Sweden to describe their war experiences
- Anne Charlotte Leffler (1849–1892), novelist, biographer
- Anna Maria Lenngren (1754–1817), well-known poet, works in support of intellectual freedom of expression for women
- Sara Lidman (1923–2004), novelist, several works translated into English
- Birgitta Lillpers (born 1958), poet, novelist
- Gunnel Linde (1924–2014), writer
- Gurli Linder (1865–1947), writer, feminist, children's literature critic
- Astrid Lindgren (1907–2002), world-famous children's writer, best known for her Pippi Longstocking stories
- Barbro Lindgren (born 1937), children's writer
- Anna Lindmarker (born 1961), journalist, broadcaster
- Elin Lindqvist (born 1982), novelist
- Eva Lindström (born 1952), illustrator and writer
- Aurora Ljungstedt (1821–1908), crime horror writer
- Kristina Lugn (1948–2020), poet, dramatist, critic

== M ==
- Bodil Malmsten (1944–2016), novelist, at least two works translated into English
- Rosa Malmström (1906–1995), librarian and gender studies specialist
- Edda Manga (born 1969), historian of ideas
- Gerda Marcus (1880–1952), journalist, philanthropist
- Liza Marklund (born 1962), best-seller crime fiction writer, works translated into 30 languages
- Moa Martinson (1890–1964), ever popular novelist, writer of articles and books in support of women's rights
- Ellen Mattson (born 1962), novelist, critic
- Katarina Mazetti (1944–2025), widely translated novelist, journalist
- Margareta Momma (1702–1772)
- Edita Morris (1902–1988), Swedish-American pacifist, short story writer, journalist, novelist
- Alva Myrdal (1902–1986), welfare state proponent, author of Crisis in the Population Question

== N ==
- Anna T. Nilsson (1869–1869), educator, peace activist, writer
- Kerstin Norborg (born 1961), novelist
- Hedvig Charlotta Nordenflycht (1718–1763), revered poet, works defending women's rights, first self-supporting female writer in Sweden
- Anna Nordgren (1847–1916), painter
- Astrid Nyberg (1877–1928), pioneering newspaper editor and suffragist
- Julia Nyberg (1784–1854), poet, songwriter, used the pen name Euphrosyne

== O ==
- Linda Olsson (born 1948), best-selling novelist, now in New Zealand
- Rosalinde von Ossietzky-Palm (1919–2000), German-born Swedish non-fiction writer and pacifist
- Nan Inger Östman (1923–2015), novelist, children's writer

== P ==
- Sara Pfeiffer (1829-1913), novelist
- Agneta Pleijel (born 1940), novelist, poet, playwright, journalist, critic, author of the philosophical novel Fungi

== R ==
- Karolina Ramqvist (born 1976), journalist
- Märta Helena Reenstierna (1753–1841), diarist
- Christina Rogberg (1832–1907), author and courtier
- Eva Runefelt (born 1953), novelist, poet
- Carina Rydberg (born 1962), novelist, author of the controversial Den högsta kasten
- Elisabeth Rynell (born 1954), poet, novelist, English translation of her novel Mervas

== S ==
- Hilda Sachs (1857–1935), journalist, novelist and women's rights activist
- Sofie Sarenbrant (born 1978), novelist
- Marie Sophie Schwartz (1819–1894), novelist
- Malla Silfverstolpe (1782–1861), diarist
- Maj Sjöwall (1935–2020), novelist, some works written in collaboration with Per Wahlöö
- Cecilia Skingsley (born 1968), journalist and economist
- Edith Södergran (1892–1923), widely recognized Swedish-language modernist poet
- Pernilla Stalfelt (born 1962), children's author and illustrator
- Ingela Strandberg (born 1944), poet, children's writer, novelist, playwright, translator, journalist and musician
- Sara Stridsberg (born 1972), novelist, poet
- Eva Ström (born 1947), poet, novelist, biographer, critic
- Amelie von Strussenfelt (1803–1847)
- Ulrika von Strussenfelt (1801–1873)
- Elsa Stuart-Bergstrom (1889–1970)
- Margareta Suber (1892–1984), novelist, travel writer, children's writer, poet
- Annakarin Svedberg (born 1934), novelist
- Maria Sveland (born 1974), novelist and journalist

== T ==
- Gunhild Tegen (1889–1970), short story writer, editor, pacifist
- Kerstin Thorvall (1925–2010), children's writer, novelist, journalist, illustrator
- Johanna Thydell (born 1980), children's and youth writer
- Anna-Clara Tidholm (born 1946), children's and youth writer, illustrator
- Mia Törnblom (born 1967), columnist, non-fiction writer, educator
- Rita Tornborg (born 1926), novelist, short story writer
- Ulla Trenter (1936–2019), novelist, translator, politician
- Birgitta Trotzig (1929–2011), celebrated writer of fiction, non-fiction and poetry
- Helene Tursten (born 1954), crime fiction writer

== U ==
- Bea Uusma (born 1966), children's writer, non-fiction writer, illustrator, medical doctor

== V ==
- Gunnel Vallquist (1918–2016), essayist, non-fiction writer, translator, religious commentary

== W ==
- Elin Wägner (1882–1949), novelist, journalist, pacifist, feminist
- Anna Westberg (1946–2005), novelist, non-fiction writer
- Josefina Wettergrund (1830–1903)
- Eva Wigström (1832–1901), writer, poet and pioneering folklorist
- Liselott Willén (born 1972), novelist
- Gunilla Wolde (1939–2015), children's writer, illustrator

== See also ==
- List of Swedish-language writers
- List of women writers

== Literature ==
- Forsas-Scott, Helena (2000). Swedish Women's Writing 1850-1995. A&C Black. ISBN 978-1-84714-197-2.
- Wilson, Katharina M. (1991). An Encyclopedia of Continental Women Writers. Taylor & Francis. ISBN 978-0-8240-8547-6.
