= Rogberg =

Rogberg is a surname. Notable people with the surname include:

- Carl Rogberg (born 1967), finance director
- Carl Georg Rogberg (1789–1834), Swedish priest
- Christina Rogberg (1832–1907), Swedish author and courtier

== See also ==
- Romberg
- Rosberg
