= Starbrink =

Starbrink is a surname. Notable people with the surname include:

- Anna Starbrink (born 1971), Swedish politician
- Beppe Starbrink (born 1966), Swedish journalist

== See also ==
- Star
- Brink (disambiguation)
