= Kontor (disambiguation) =

A kontor (also Kontor) was a major foreign trading post of the Hanseatic League. Kontor may also refer to:

- Kontor Records, record label based in Hamburg, Germany
- Anja Kontor, Swedish journalist and television presenter
- Kontor is an alternate spelling of the surname of Owusu-Ansah Kontoh, Ghanaian footballer
