= Ånimskog Church =

- Ånimskogs Kyrka
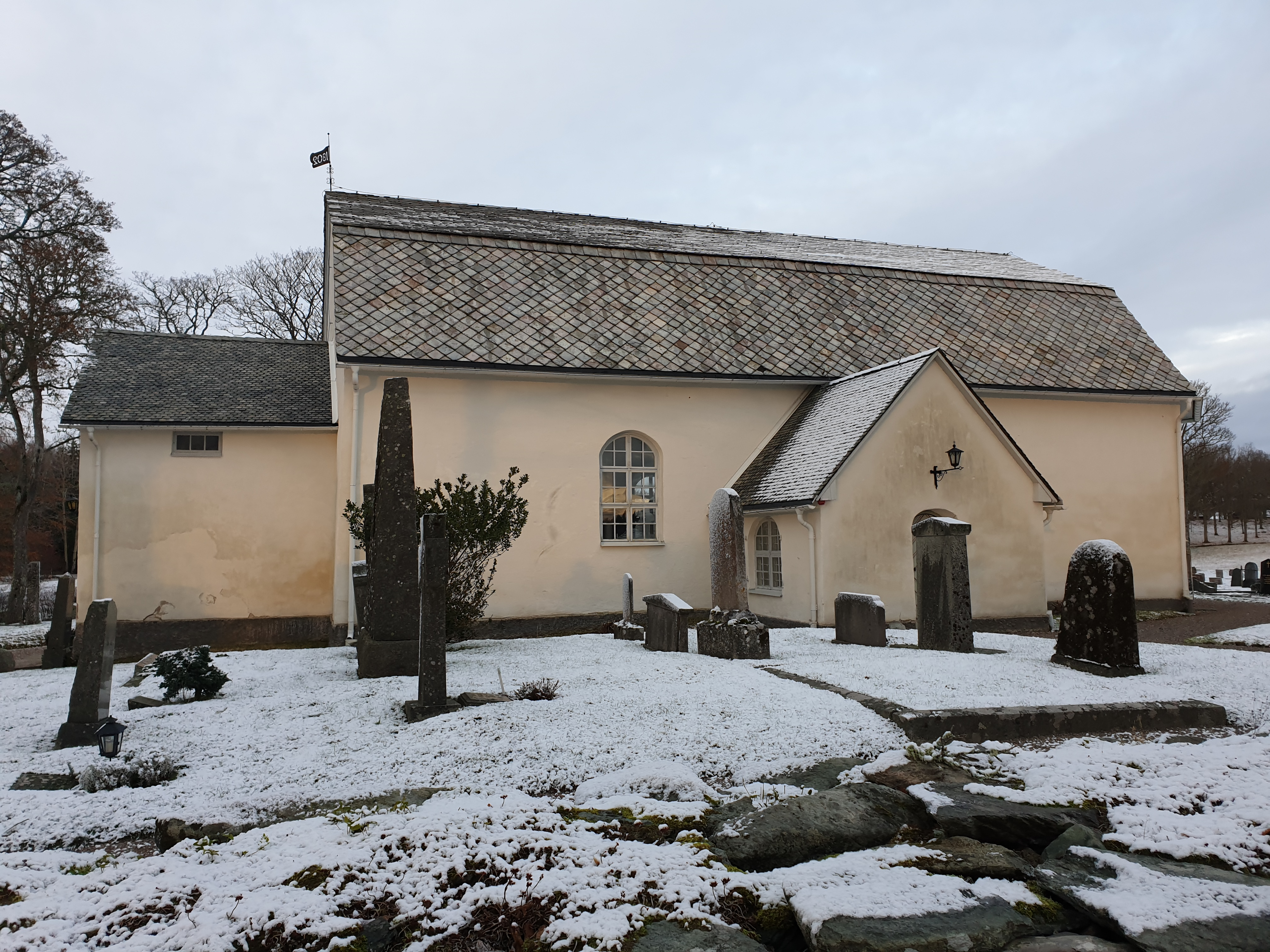
- The Ånimskog Church building has a very long history, dating back all the latter half of the 13th century.
- Ånimskog Church
- 58°53′31″N 12°32′23″E
- Country: Sweden
- Denomination: Church of Sweden
- Website: www.svenskakyrkan.se/amal/animskogs-kyrk

History
- Founded: late 13th century

Ånimskog Church is a church built during the Middle Ages. Since 2010, the church building belongs to the Åmål Parish. The church assembly was part of Karlstad Diocese. The church is located a few hundred meters from the west beach of Vänern in the Åmål Municipality.

== The church building ==
The church was built in the second half of the 13th century. It was probably square-shaped, but enlarged in the 17th and 18th centuries. Ånimskog church is one of the oldest churches in Dalsland considered one of that region's three most beautiful churches. The ceiling painting was decorated by Hans Georg Schüffner in 1739.

At around the same time, a small house was erected in the south part of the church, for storage of weapons.

== Inventory ==
The altarpiece and pulpit are from the 18th century, constructed by Lars Falcon who is from Ånimskog.

The baptismal font is from the 1200s. Its height is 80 cm and it consists of two parts with exactly the same size. The font is bowl-shaped and is unevenly cut along the top. The foot is tapered with a strong round bar below the top. There is a chimney in the middle of the church building. The church was damaged in the 1800s, and despite restorations over the years, there are still numerous problems to be fixed.

== Bell tower ==
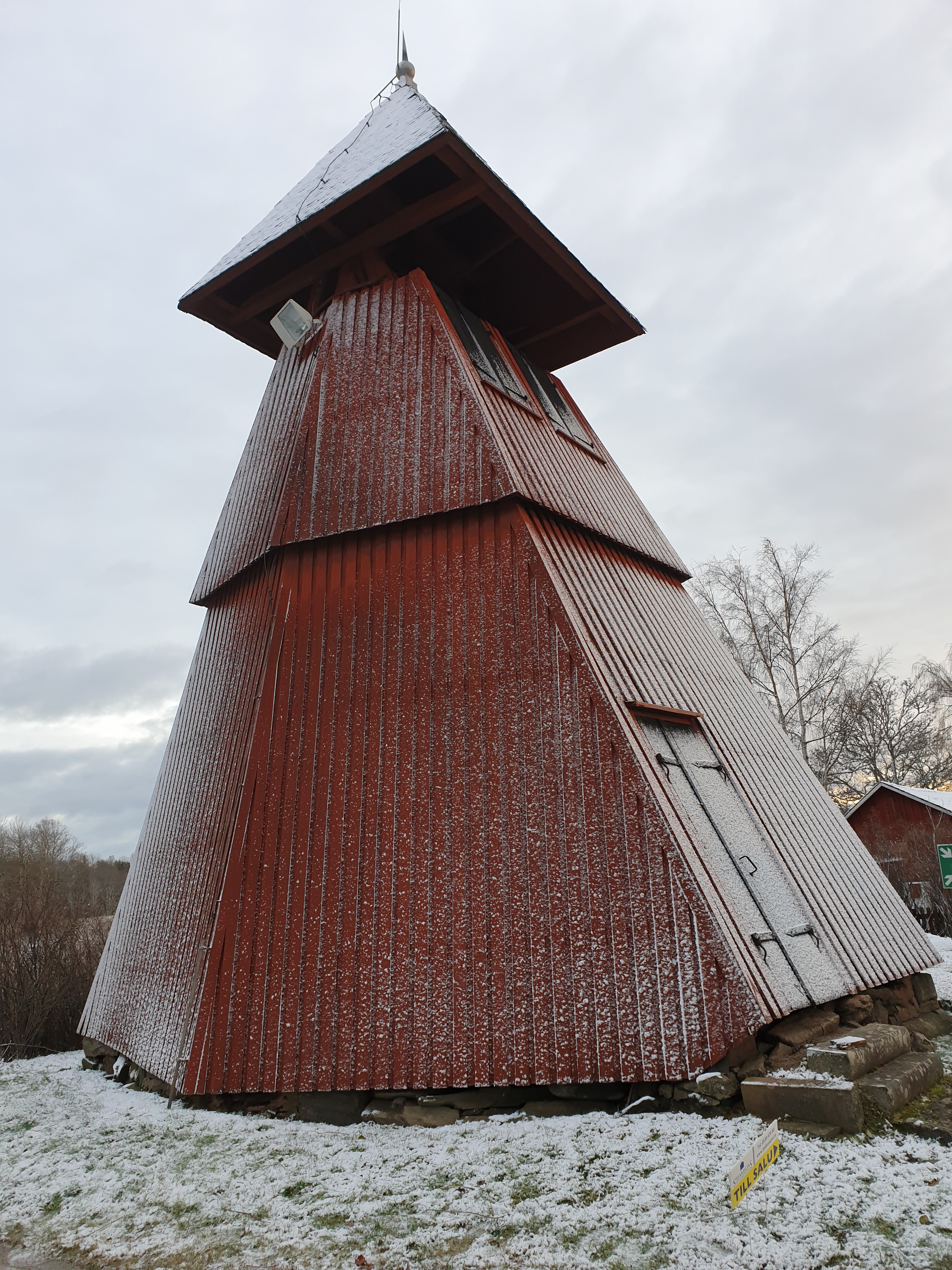
Ånimskog belltower

South of the church, outside the cemetery wall, stands a board-lined and red-painted bell tower. It was built in 1731 by carpenter Per Andersson from Sotebyn in Tösse.
