= Cutting extinguisher =

Fire extinguishing technique

The use of a cutting extinguisher is a fire extinguishing technique that combines abrasive waterjet cutting with water spray extinguishing, through a single handpiece or nozzle. The fire-fighter approaches the fire from outside the main fire area, then uses the cutting action to drill a small hole through a door or wall. Switching to a water spray then allows the fire to be fought, as with a conventional fog nozzle.

The main advantages of this system are in increased safety for the firefighter, as they remain outside the most hazardous area. In particular, the need for highly-dangerous smoke diving is reduced. The small size of the access hole also reduces any risk of flashover or backdraft. Flashover is reduced by avoiding the need to open up a large access hole, while backdraft is reduced by the flow of water through this small hole keeping any flow cooled and directed inwards, towards the fire.

Secondary advantages are in gaining rapid access to the seat of the fire, directly through most construction materials and without needing to cause structural damage that may further weaken a structure.

== Cobra cutting extinguisher ==
The cutting extinguisher technique originates in Sweden, with Cold Cut Systems Svenska AB. Cold Cut Systems Svenska AB was founded in 1988. The origins of the company was in water jet cutting but in cooperation with Räddningsverket (today the Swedish Civil Contingencies Agency (MSB)), the coldcut Cobra cutting extinguisher was developed in the mid-1990s with the first commercial cutting extinguisher available in 2000. In 2008, Saab acquired a 27% stake in the company.

The first two commercial Cobra systems sold were bought by the Swedish Fire and Rescue Services in Borås and Sörmlandskusten.

Today there are about 1300 systems in 45 countries worldwide. Most of the Cobra systems are used by municipal Fire and Rescue Services. However, Cobra is also used in; refineries, car production, steel- and paper industry, chemical processing industry, non-nuclear and nuclear power plants, coal mines, airports, and maritime departments.

Water is supplied to the Cobra at about 300 bar and a flow rate of up to 60 litres / minute through a lightweight hose that with extensions can be up to 300 meters long. With 350 litres of water carried on-board this allows several minutes active use, even without connection to a fire hydrant. It can cut through 15 cm of concrete in 75 seconds and 10mm steel in 60 seconds.

With the coldcut Cobra cutting extinguisher a fire fighter can attack a fire from the safety of being outside the fire room. The water jet combined with an abrasive cutting sand makes it possible to 'shoot' right through a wall or other structure. When the water jet has penetrated the fine water droplets in the water jet hits the hot fire gases in the fire room and are turned to steam. This sucks the energy out of the fire and quickly reduces the temperature in the fire room to the point where the risk of a back-draft is very much reduced or eliminated. It is then safer to make entry into the fire room and apply conventional fire fighting tactics if required. As very little water is used in the process there is also much less water damage to take care of compared with conventional fire fighting methods.

As tactics has developed over the 10 years the technology has been applied it has been found that especially the combination with a Thermal Imaging Camera is useful. The camera is used for finding hotspots or for reading a building etc. and the cutting extinguisher is used for attacking those spots while the result is monitored with the camera. The cutting extinguisher has also been used successfully in combination with positive pressure ventilation (PPV) fans.

The Swedish contingencies agency recently published a report on 10 years user experience of the Cobra cutting extinguisher in Sweden.

== PyroLance USA ==
PyroLance is a firefighting system that cools and contains fires and fire gases. Utilizing a combination of high-pressure water and a nonsparking abrasive material, the PyroLance pierces exterior structures, and blankets the thermal layers inside with a fog of atomized water. The PyroLance introduces its fine mist of water through a small opening; therefore, a rapid reduction in temperature occurs without introducing large amounts of oxygen, reducing the likelihood of flashover or backdraft.

During piercing operations, the abrasive aggregate is carried with the high velocity water, allowing the PyroLance to create a pea-size hole in any material. Once the opening has been made, a second trigger allows the operator to switch to plain water and/or water with foam. Starting the flow of water turns the PyroLance into a fire confinement tool injecting its high-pressure fog stream directly into the thermal layer while the operator remains in a protected position outside.
