= Holmsten =

Holmsten is a surname. Notable people with the surname include:

- Karl-Arne Holmsten (1911–1995), Swedish film actor
- Sara Holmsten (1715–1795), Swedish memoirist
- Sevi Holmsten (1921–1993), Finnish rower
- My Ann Kristina Holmsten (1957 - ) Swedish dancer and actress

== Origin ==
The surname was found in the USA, UK, and Canada back in 1891 to 1920. Most families with this name were found in the USA in 1920 that included 3 families living in Illinois which further made up about 20% of all the recorded Holmsten's in the USA.

== Occupation ==
In 1940, Tire Blder was the top reported job for people in the USA named Holmsten with 50% of Holmsten men working as Tire Blders. Other 50% worked as blacksmith helpers.

== Life expectancy ==
Between 1962 and 2004, in the United States, Holmsten life expectancy was at its lowest in 1976, and highest in 2004. The average life expectancy for Holmsten in 1962 was 63, and 98 in 2004.
