= Anna Hamilton Geete =

Swedish translator and writer

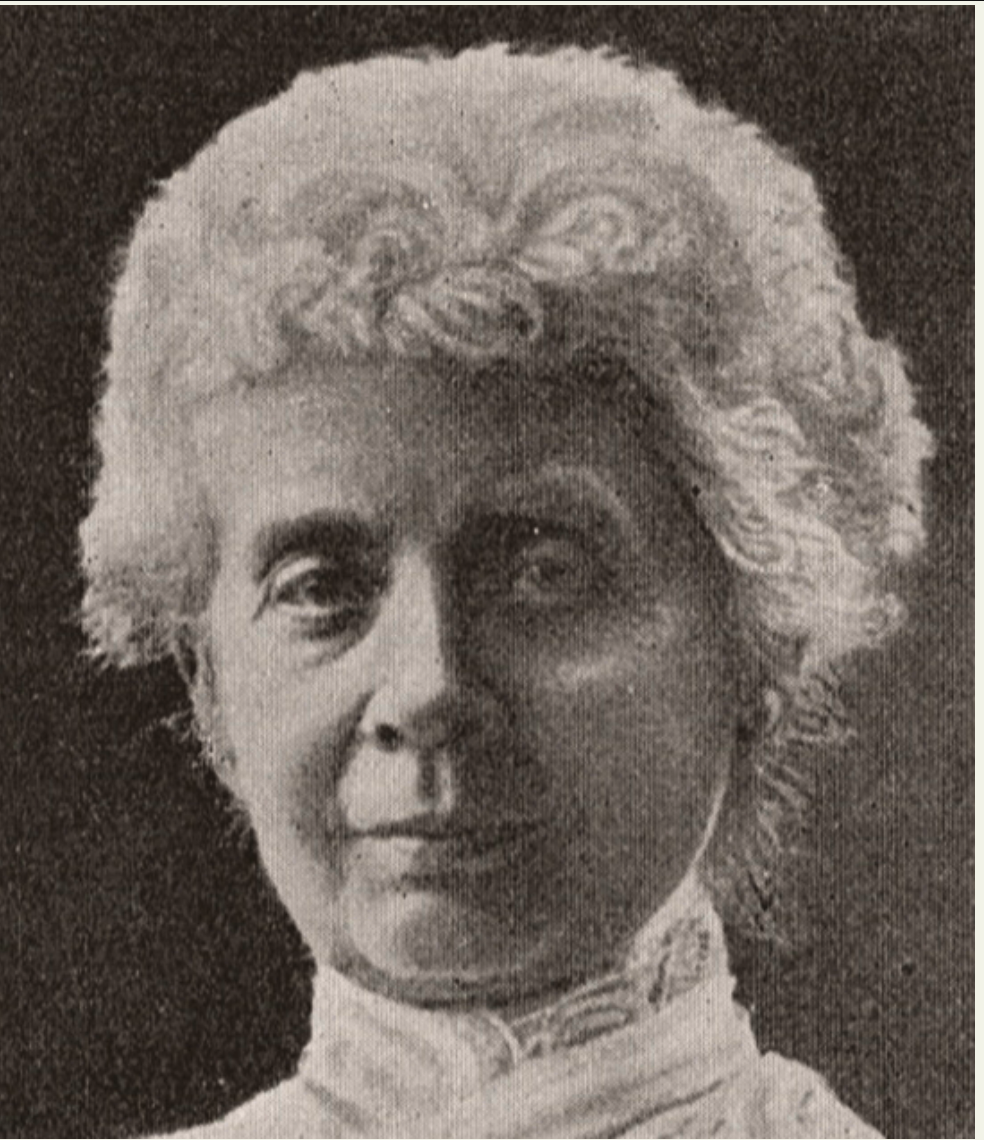
Anna Hamiltorn Geete (1900)

Anna Charlotta Hamilton Geete née Hamilton (1848–1913) was a Swedish translator and writer. Fluent from childhood in several languages, she is remembered not only for her translations into Swedish of many English-speaking authors, including Mark Twain, Rudyard Kipling and Robert Louis Stevenson, but for an extensive and widely acclaimed biography of her grandfather, the influential philosopher and historian Erik Gustaf Geijer. Her account also covers detailed depictions of several celebrated women of the times.

== Early life, education and family ==
Born on 2 March 1848 in Husaby, Götene Municipality, in western Sweden, Anna Charlotta Hamilton was the daughter of count Adolf Ludvig Hamilton (1820–1896) and his wife Johanna Ulrika Agnes née Geijer. She was one of the family's eight children. Educated by German, British and French governesses, she was exposed from childhood to literature, art and music. Her brother Hugo noted that she could read English when five, German by the age of seven and French before she was ten. She furthered her knowledge of German by three trips to Germany with her mother and that of English by befriending the British Nonnen family in a neighbouring estate. On 2 September 1876, she married the physician Gustav Vilhelm Geete.

== Professional life ==
Although she briefly studied painting in 1873, Hamilton Geete realized it was in literature and translation that her talents lay. After her marriage in 1876, she published a wide selection of translations, including works of fiction by Bret Harte, Mark Twain, Robert Louis Stevenson and Constance Fenimore Woolson. She is however remembered above all for the interest she took in her maternal grandfather, the influential philosopher Erik Gstaf Geijer, whose biography I solnedgången. Minnen och bilder från Erik Gustaf Geijers senaste lefnadsår (In the sunset. Memories and images of Erik Gustaf Geijer's last years of life) she published in four volumes from 1910 to 1914. The work proved popular and received a prize from the Swedish Academy. It features extensive coverage of several women including Geijer's wife Anna-Lisa and his daughter Agnes and of his intellectual acquaintances such as Malla Silfverstolpe, Fredrika Bremer, Jenny Lind, Thekla Knös. Attention is given to their struggle for education and their success as writers, actresses or singers.

Anna Hamilton Geete died in Borås on 24 February 1913.
