= Tösse =

- Location within Västra Götaland Location within Sweden
- Coordinates: 58°58′N 12°37′E
- Country: Sweden
- Province: Dalsland
- County: Västra Götaland County
- Municipality: Åmål Municipality

Area
  - Total: 0.58 km^{2} (0.22 sq mi)

Population (31 December 2010)
  - Total: 305
  - Density: 524/km^{2} (1,360/sq mi)
- Time zone: UTC+1 (CET)
  - Summer (DST): UTC+2 (CEST)
- Climate: Dfb

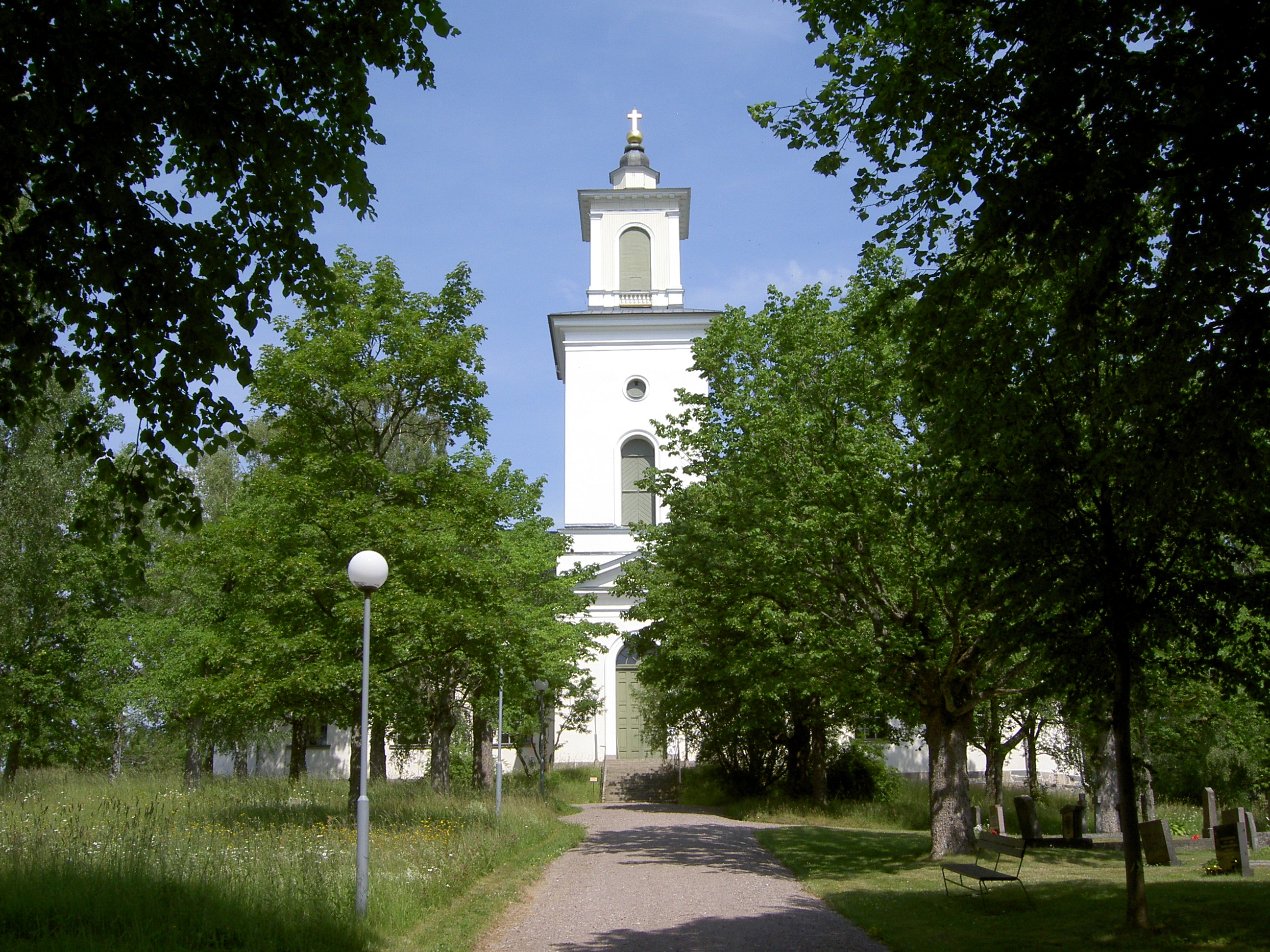
Tösse new church

Tösse is a locality situated in Åmål Municipality, Västra Götaland County, Sweden with 305 inhabitants in 2010.

== Notable people ==
- Elisabet Kjellberg (1821-1914), publicist, editor, and author
