= Elisabet Kjellberg =

Elisabet Kjellberg (3 October 1821 – 29 November 1914) was a Swedish publicist, editor and author.

Gustafva Elisabet Kjellberg was born at Tösse in Dalsland, Sweden. She moved to Uppsala in the 1870s. In 1896 she moved to Djursholm where she died during 1914.

Kjellberg published the literary magazine Läsning för hemmet from 1879 to 1904. It mainly contained biographies of Swedish culture personalities and authors, often her friends and mostly written by herself. The magazine also included contributions by contemporary Swedish authors. The most noted biography from the magazine was that of Swedish lecturer Pontus Wikner (1837–1888).
