= Dagmar Lange =

Swedish writer

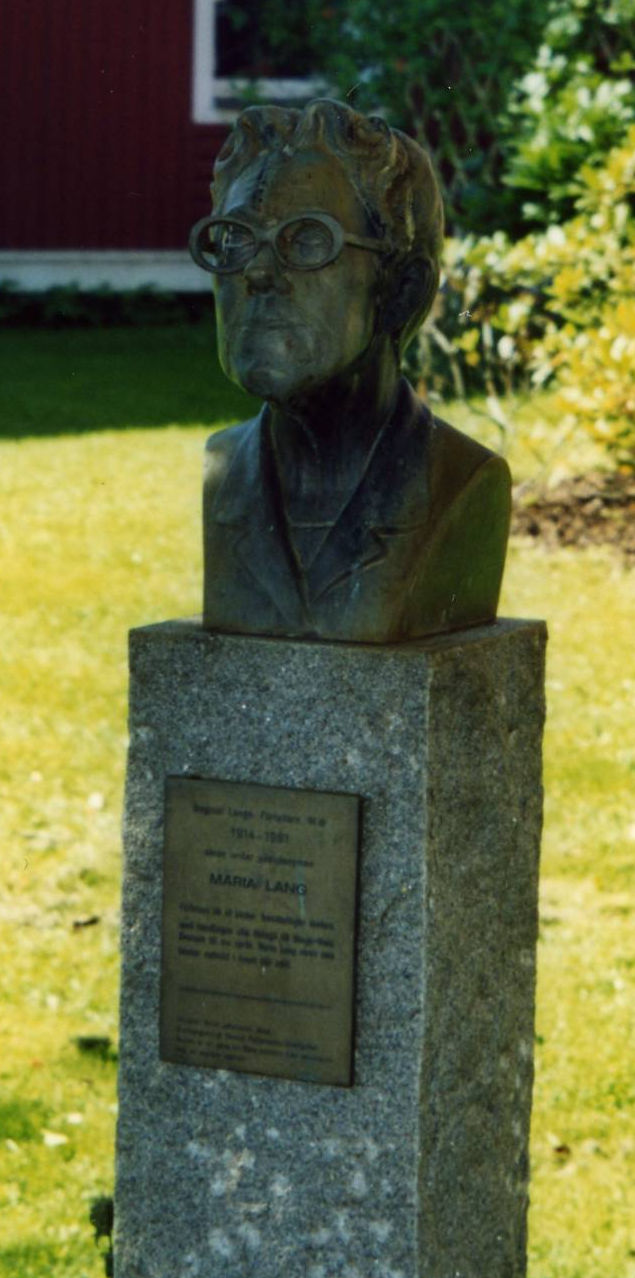
- Bust of Lange in her home town of Nora.
- Born: Dagmar Maria Lange; 31 March 1914; Västerås, Sweden
- Died: 9 October 1991 (aged 77); Nora, Sweden
- Writing career
- Pen name: Maria Lang
- Period: 1949–1990
- Genre: Crime fiction

Dagmar Maria Lange (31 March 1914 – 9 October 1991, Nora) was a Swedish author of crime fiction under the pen name Maria Lang. She was one of the first detective novelists in the Swedish language, and her books helped make the genre popular in Sweden.

== Early life and academic career ==
Lange was born in Västerås to journalist Clas Lange and Elsa Kejser. The family moved to Lindesberg in 1915, when her father was appointed editor and publisher of the newspaper Bergslagernas Tidning. In 1917, her father died from appendicitis when Dagmar Lange was just two years old. In 1919, her mother married merchant Carl Ivar Olson, and they settled in Nora.

Lange enrolled as a student of Scandinavian languages in Uppsala in 1933, and from 1934 at Stockholms högskola. The subject for her PhD thesis in 1946 was Pontus Wikner. From 1946 to 1968, she worked at Ahlströmska skolan (Nya Elementarskolan för flickor), a private gymnasium in Stockholm, first as a teacher and eventually as the principal.

== Literary career ==
Her first novel, Mördaren ljuger inte ensam (The Murderer is Not the Only Liar), was published in 1949 and caused some controversy because two of the main characters lived in a homosexual relationship. The book was given a positive review by Barbro Alving in Dagens Nyheter.

Lange wrote more than 40 detective novels, as well as crime fiction for young adults. Most of her books are set in the fictional Swedish town Skoga, which is based on Lange's home town Nora. She was one of the original 13 members of the Swedish Crime Writers' Academy when it was founded in 1971.

== Books in Swedish ==
- Mördaren ljuger inte ensam (1949), film adaptation made in 2013
- Farligt att förtära (1950)
- Inte flera mord (1951), film adaptation made in 2013
- En skugga blott (1952)
- Rosor, kyssar och döden (1953) film adaptation made in 2013
- Tragedi på en lantkyrkogård (1954), film adaptations made in 1961 & 2013
- Se döden på dig väntar (1955)
- Mörkögda augustinatt (1956)
- Kung Liljekonvalje av dungen (1957), film adaptations made in 1961 & 2013
- Farliga drömmar (1958) film adaptation made in 2013
- Ofärd i huset bor (1959)
- Vår sång blir stum (1960)
- Att vara kvinna (1961)
- En främmande man (1962)
- Tre små gummor (1963)
- Ögonen (1964)
- Siden sammet (1964)
- De röda kattorna (1965)
- Svart sommar (1966)
- Vitklädd med ljus i hår (1967)
- Ingen returbiljett (1968)
- Intrigernas hus (1969)
- Staden sover (1970)
- Mördarens bok (1971)
- Vem väntar på värdshuset? (1972)
- Vi var tretton i klassen (1973)
- Det är ugglor i mossen (1974)
- Dubbelsäng i Danmark (1975)
- Körsbär i november (1976)
- Arvet efter Alberta (1977)
- Camilla vid skiljevägen (1978)
- Svar till Ensam Eva (1979)
- Inga pengar till Vendela (1980)
- Gullregn i oktober (1981)
- Docka vit, Docka röd (1982)
- Fyra fönster mot gården (1983)
- Använd aldrig arsenik (1984)
- Klappa inte katten (1985)
- Dödligt drama på Dramaten (1986)
- Ånglok 16 på fel spår (1987)
- Tvillingen i spegeln (1988)
- Flyttbil försvunnen (1989)
- Se Skoga och sedan... (1990)

== See also ==
- Crimes of Passion
