= Go'kväll =

Swedish daily television show

- Country of origin: Sweden
- Original language: Swedish

Original release
- Network: SVT2
- Release: 30 September 1997

Go'kväll is a Swedish daily television show broadcast at Sveriges Television. The show consists of interviews, singer performances and cooking. It has had different hosts, including Anja Kontor, Suzanne Axell and Beppe Starbrink.

It was first broadcast on 30 September 1997.

It ended its broadcast on 21 December 2025 after being cancelled.
