= Rescue Services Agency (Sweden) =

The Swedish Rescue Services Agency (SRSA) (Swedish: Statens räddningsverk (SRV)) was the central supervisory government agency for the rescue services in Sweden until 2008, after which it merged into the newly formed Swedish Civil Contingencies Agency on 1 January 2009. It promoted emergency management practice that improved disaster prevention and response, and in the event of an incident/accident limited injury and damage. This was achieved among other ways by conveying information, by running training courses and holding exercises, and through supervision.

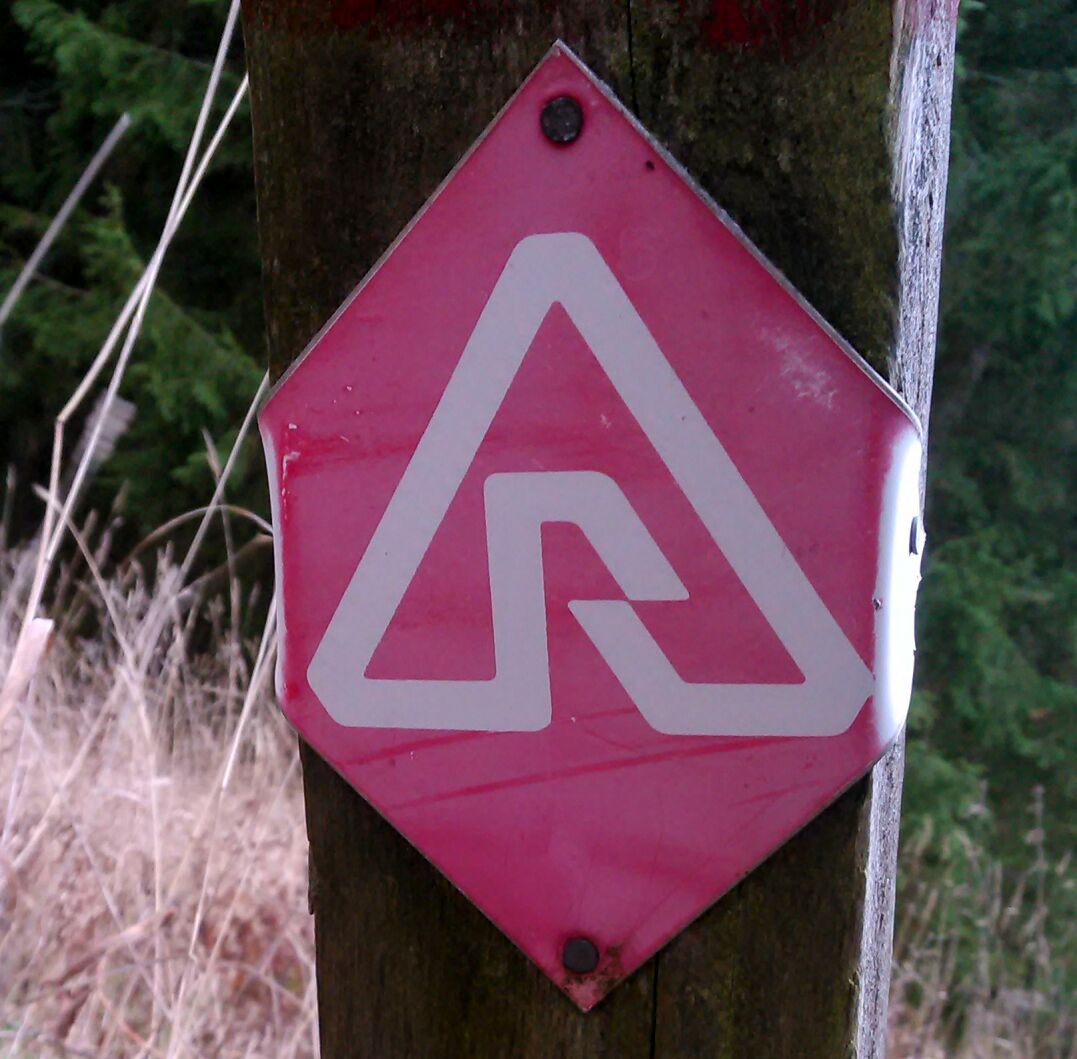
Plate with the logo marking the boundary of the training area outside of Skövde.

== Government function ==
The SRSA was the central Swedish supervisory government authority for the rescue services. Its tasks included examining co-ordination between the various branches of the national rescue services, as well as contingency planning by the county administrative boards for the rescue services in the event of a release of radioactive substances. The agency also collated observations and lessons learned from serious emergencies that have occurred at home or abroad. Its tasks included examining co-ordination between the various branches of the state rescue services, as well as the county administrative boards' planning for the rescue services in the event of a release of radioactive substances. The agency gained experience from major incidents that have occurred in Sweden and worldwide. The SRSA developed methods and equipment for use by the rescue services, and was responsible for the training of all personnel in the municipal fire and rescue service brigades and in the chimney sweeping service. The agency also implemented rules for safety in relation to the transport of dangerous goods by road and rail, and co-ordinated the work of the supervisory authorities within this field.

=== Domestic expertise ===
In the event of oil spill, equipment from one of the agency’s five oil-combating depots may be used. The agency also had seven depots holding equipment and trained personnel for use when responding to chemical emergencies. Furthermore, the government had an agreement with six municipalities, which states that they are to assist the Swedish Maritime Administration and the Swedish Coast Guard with emergency operations at sea.

=== Overseas operations ===
The SRSA maintained a state of emergency preparedness to assist other countries with rescue and humanitarian aid operations. The majority of personnel employed on such assignments were recruited from the municipal fire & rescue services. The SRSA was a prominent actor in mine action and Explosive Ordnance Disposal for development.

== Organisation ==
The central administration offices for the Swedish Rescue Services Agency were situated in Karlstad. Their four colleges were located at Revingeby, Rosersberg Palace, Sandö and Skövde provided the training for all the personnel in the municipal fire & rescue services and in the chimney sweeping service. The agency had its main office in Karlstad and its offices for overseas operations in Kristinehamn.

== Restructuring ==
On 18 March 2008 the Swedish government made a decision to restructure its peace-time emergency management agencies. As part of this decision, the SRSA, the Swedish Emergency Management Agency, and the Swedish National Board of Psychological Defence were dissolved at the end of 2008. The Swedish Civil Contingencies Agency replaced the previous three bodies.

== See also ==
- Emergency service
- Swedish Armed Forces
- Government agencies in Sweden
- Swedish response to Hurricane Katrina
- Cutting extinguisher A novel fire-extinguishing technique, developed by Räddningsverket
