= Fengersfors =

- Location within Västra Götaland Location within Sweden
- Coordinates: 58°59′N 12°28′E
- Country: Sweden
- Province: Dalsland
- County: Västra Götaland County
- Municipality: Åmål Municipality

Area
  - Total: 0.97 km^{2} (0.37 sq mi)

Population (31 December 2010)
  - Total: 345
  - Density: 356/km^{2} (920/sq mi)
- Time zone: UTC+1 (CET)
  - Summer (DST): UTC+2 (CEST)
- Climate: Dfb

Fengersfors is a locality situated in Åmål Municipality, Västra Götaland County, Sweden with 345 inhabitants in 2010.

Fengersfors was originally named Lisefors after the wife of industrialist Christopher Sahlin, Anna Lisa. The name was changed to Fengersfors by industrialist Johan Fenger-Krog.

Fengersfors is an industrial community where iron, pulp, and paper have been produced. Fengersfors bruk (mill) was closed down in 1978, and since 2003, the site has been used for arts and crafts and small businesses, primarily within the framework of the artists' cooperative Not Quite.
