= Åmål Municipality =

Åmål Municipality Åmåls kommun
- Municipality
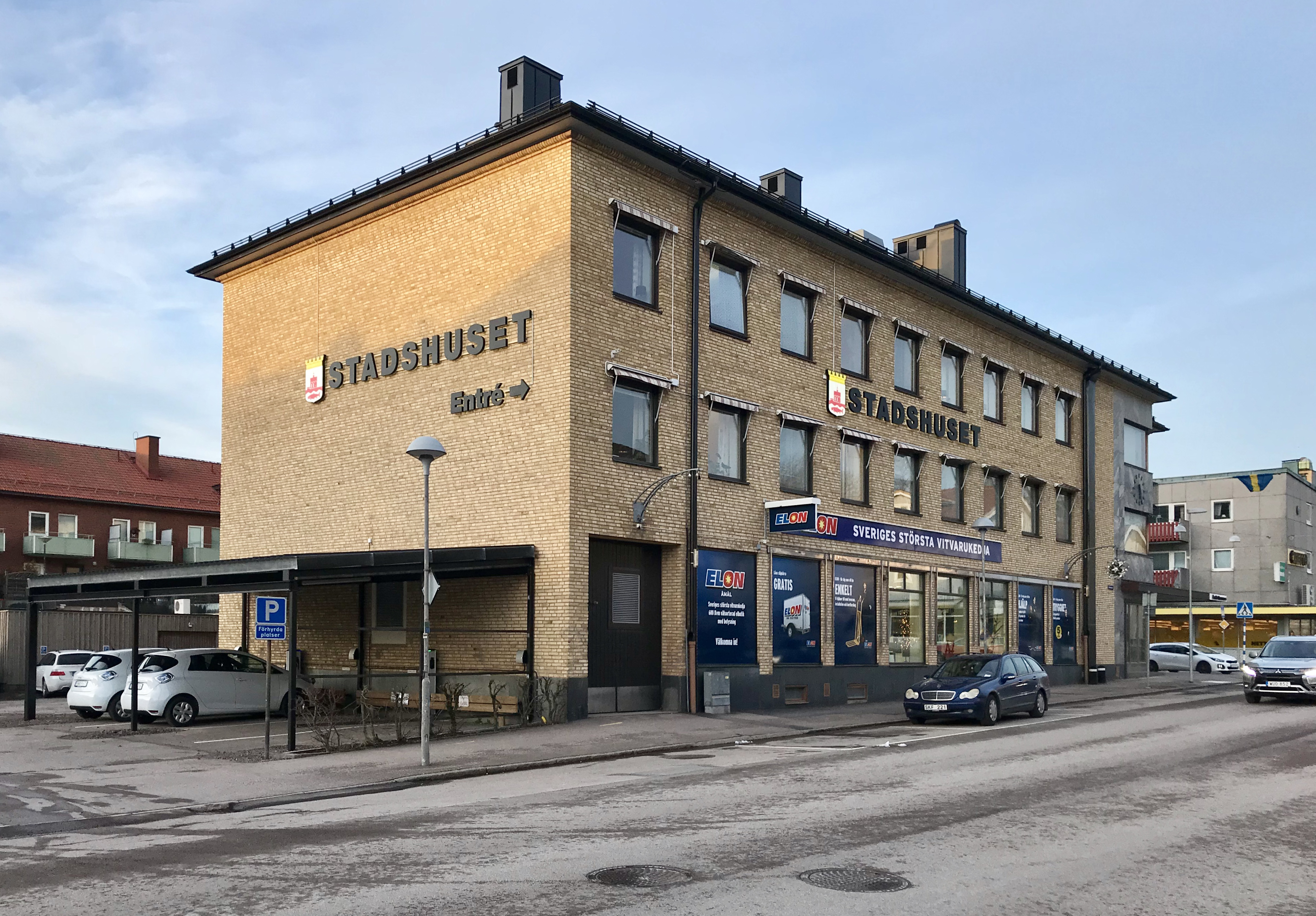
- Åmål town hall

- Coat of arms

- Coordinates: 59°03′N 12°42′E
- Country: Sweden
- County: Västra Götaland County
- Seat: Åmål

Area
  - Total: 889.71 km^{2} (343.52 sq mi)
  - Land: 481.12 km^{2} (185.76 sq mi)
  - Water: 408.59 km^{2} (157.76 sq mi)
- Area as of 1 January 2014.

Population (30 June 2025)
  - Total: 11,844
  - Density: 24.618/km^{2} (63.759/sq mi)
- Time zone: UTC+1 (CET)
  - Summer (DST): UTC+2 (CEST)
- ISO 3166 code: SE
- Province: Dalsland
- Municipal code: 1492
- Website: www.amal.se

Åmål Municipality (Swedish: Åmåls kommun) is a municipality in Västra Götaland County in western Sweden. Its seat is located in the city of Åmål.

The present municipality was created in 1971 through the amalgamation of the former City of Åmål and the former rural municipality of Tössbo (the latter created in 1952).

== Geography and natural resources ==
The city of Åmål is located in a scenic bay of Lake Vänern, the largest lake in Sweden. The municipality has a small archipelago with some 30 islands, called Tösse skärgård, to the south of the city. The islands are protected as a nature preserve; many of the islands are wooded, but a few are used for farming. They provide habitat for a number of bird species, including grey heron, osprey, mallard, goldeneye, goosander, the black-throated diver and hobby in the bays; on the cobs are colonies of herring gull, and the common tern; while on the fir-covered islands are capercaillie, woodpeckers and other birds.

Population centers in the municipality include Åmål, Fengersfors, and Tösse.

== Demographics ==
This is a demographic table based on Åmål Municipality's electoral districts in the 2022 Swedish general election sourced from SVT's election platform, in turn taken from SCB official statistics.

In total there were 12,302 residents, including 9,585 Swedish citizens of voting age. 46.3% voted for the left coalition and 52.5% for the right coalition. Indicators are in percentage points except population totals and income.

Location	Residents	Citizen adults	Left vote	Right vote	Employed	Swedish parents	Foreign heritage	Income SEK	Degree
Location			%	%					
Tösse-Fröskog	2,050	1,624	43.3	55.3	80	89	11	22,639	28
Åmål C	2,296	1,678	54.3	43.7	60	60	40	17,038	29
Åmål NV	2,006	1,502	48.7	50.1	78	80	20	24,998	32
Åmål N-Mo	2,224	1,759	40.2	59.3	83	90	10	26,124	34
Åmål SV	1,898	1,568	48.1	51.1	80	88	12	23,259	30
Åmål S	1,828	1,454	44.4	54.2	73	81	19	22,655	33
Source: SVT

== Economy ==
Fishing was once a major industry, as indicated by the fish appearing on the bottom of the coat of arms. Logging was also of importance. In recent years tourism, especially activities connected to the use of the lake, have increased.

== Sister cities ==
Åmål has seven twin towns:

(Finland)	Loimaa, Finland
(Estonia)	Türi, Estonia
(Norway)	Drøbak, Norway
(Denmark)	Grenaa, Denmark
(Germany)	Gadebusch, Germany
(United States)	De Pere, Wi, United States
(Bulgaria)	Kubrat, Bulgaria
