= Thekla Knös =

Swedish writer

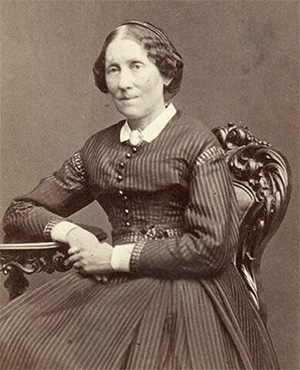
- Born: 17 July 1815; Uppsala
- Died: 10 March 1880 (aged 64); Växjö
- Occupations: writer and translator
- Writing career
- Genre: poetry
- Notable work: Ragnar Lodbrok

Thekla Levinia Andrietta Knös (17 July 1815, Uppsala – 10 March 1880, Växjö), was a Swedish writer, poet and translator.

== Life ==
Her parents were the wealthy professor Gustaf Knös (d. 1828) and the literary upper class socialite Alida Maria Olbers, and she was given the education and accomplishments customary for upper class girls. She and her mother were both important members of the high society life in Uppsala, where they were described as "light beauties, genies of jokes, joy and poetry". Her mother hosted a literary salon, and Knös was raised in a cultivated but extremely sheltered environment in a home "where they, surrounded by flowers and paintings, lived a life which was allowed to mix with reality only when necessary".

Thekla Knös was described as serious and cultivated, but sheltered and ignorant of all practical necessities of life, nervous and depressive, witty and entertaining but oversensitive and mentally fragile. She had many friends among the Swedish cultural elite, notably Fredrika Bremer and Pontus Wikner, and was described as a devoted friend and confidante "who diminished herself in overflowing compassion", and reportedly, she refused to wear the fashionable crinoline because she did not wish to take so much space in the world. In 1870, she was afflicted by a mental illness and placed in a mental asylum in Växjö, where she spent her remaining life until her death ten years later.

== Literary career ==
In 1855, her life changed by the death of her mother and her sudden need to support herself. She lived on the charity of protective friends and relatives, but started to support herself by translations and by giving language lessons. In her mother's salon, she was affected by the then fashionable German romanticism, which affected her poetic production. Her poems centred around descriptions of the Uppsala of her childhood, heroic poetry in the style of the then fashionable Gothicism, scenes from nature and everyday life and poems and songs for children in the idyllic and realistic style of the late romanticism.

Her poems were successful and given good critics: in 1846, they were read aloud in the Swedish Academy; in 1851 they were awarded first and second prize by the academy, and as a sign of recognition, the academy gave her monetary contributions from time to time. She was also active as the writer of children's books. In Fotografier af det forna upsalalifvet, the characters depicted were in fact descriptions of her acquaintances such as Per Daniel Amadeus Atterbom, Erik Gustaf Geijer and Hans Järta.

== Selected works ==
- Ragnar Lodbrok (1851), writing, winner of the grand prize of the Swedish academy
- Dikter I (1852), poem
- Elfvornas qvällar (1852)
- Dikter II (1853), poem
- Konvaljerna with Daniel and Louisa Müller (1855)
- Fyrväpplingen with Daniel and Louisa Müller and Fredrika Bremer (1855), verse and prose
- Sång vid öfverlämnandet af ett standar till Christiania studenter från Upsala damer (1856), song
- Kaffebjudningen. Af förf. till Sjöjungfruns saga (1858), poem
- Fotografier af det forna upsalalifvet (1864), prose
- Året. Teckningar ur barndomslifvet (1868), prose
- Efterlemnade anteckningar (1881)

== Sources ==
- Knös. 6. Tekla Levina Andrietta i Nordisk familjebok (andra upplagan, 1911)
- Thekla Knös at Svenskt kvinnobiografiskt lexikon
