= Brita Egardt =

Swedish ethnologist and folklorist

Brita Sigrid Anna Lovisa Egardt (née Mellander; 1916–1990) was a Swedish ethnologist and folklorist who undertook research into folk beliefs and customs. Attached to the Folklife Archive (Folklivsarkivet) at Lund University, from 1967 to 1973 she was docent of Nordic and comparative folklore research (Nordisk och jämförande folklivsforskning) and thereafter docent of ethnology research specializing in folk customs. In addition to her highly rated 1962 thesis Hästslakt och rackarskam (The slaughter of horses and the shame of the slaughterers), she was a co-editor of Schwedische Volkskunde. Quellen. Forschung. Ergebnisse (1961) and contributed articles on folklore to various journals.

== Early life, education and family ==
Born in Trelleborg on 7 August 1916, Brita Sigrid Anna Lovisa Mellander was the daughter of the postmaster Arvid Gottfrid Mellander and his wife Augusta Matilda (Mattis) née Johnsson. She was the family's second child. After matriculating from Malmö's high school for girls in 1936, she studied Nordic studies, history of religion and folklore, graduating in 1941. In 1941, she married the banker Otto Egardt with whom she had two children, Eva-Mia and Peter. In 1962, she was awarded a doctorate on the basis of her thesis on the slaughter of horses.

== Career ==
After working as an assistant (amanuens) at Lund University's historical museum, in 1952 she was promoted to principal assistant and in 1964 to archivist. From 1967 to 1973, she was docent for Nordic and folklore studies and thereafter for ethnology.

Egardt's work focuses mainly on folk beliefs and customs as well as people's likes and dislikes. She also devoted attention to traditional meals. All these topics are covered in her 1962 thesis Hästslakt och rackarskam: En etnologisk undersökning av folkliga fördomar (The slaughter of horses and the shame of the slaughterers: an ethnological investigation of folk prejudice) which was well received by its reviewers and given an unusually high rating. The Swedish ethnologist Barbro Blehr has argued that in view of the thesis' focus on hierarchy, exclusion and stigmatisation, it can be used as a model for ethnologists. Egardt was a co-editor of Schwedische Volkskunde. Quellen. Forschung. Ergebnisse (1961) and contributed articles on folklore to various journals.

Although she retired in 1983, Brita Egardt continued to work part-time until 1988. She died in Lund on 4 April 1990 and was buried in the city's Northern Cemetery (Norra kyrkogården).
