= Gunhild Tegen =

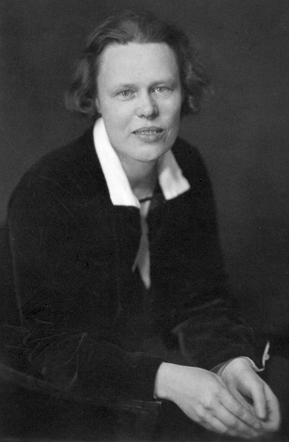
Gunhild Tegen

Gunhild Maria Elisabet Tegen née Nordling, pen name Tilja, (1889–1970) was a Swedish writer, translator and peace activist. In addition to short stories and autobiographical works, in 1935 she wrote a film script titled En judisk tragedi (A Jewish Tragedy) based on the problems facing the Jews in Europe. From the beginning of World War II, Tegen was active in supporting refugees and contributing to the peace movement. In 1945, as editor of De dödsdömda vittna (Testimonial of the Condemned), she sought to present accounts collected from Jewish refugees, in particular from those detained in concentration camps.

== Early life and family ==
Born on 15 August 1889 in the village of Njurunda near Sundsvall on the west coast of Sweden, Gunhild Maria Elisabet Nordling was the daughter of Johan Petter Nordling (1854–1912), a sea captain, and his wife Maria Erika née Dahlén (1857–1931). The eldest of the family's five children, she referred to herself as Alfa or Ettan (Number One). Brought up on the nearby island of Alnön, she matriculated from high school in 1909, earned an elementary school teaching diploma in 1910 and went on to study at Uppsala University (1911–1912). In 1915, she married the philosophy professor Einar Tegen (1884–1965) with whom she had two children: Inga (1916) and Martin (1919).

== Career ==
Tegen was employed first as a teacher at Sundsvall girls' school (1913–1914). After her marriage, in the 1920s she worked as a columnist for various newspapers, also contributing short stories. In 1929, drawing on her life in Uppsala, she published her first book Eros i Uppsala under the pen name Tor Tilja. To contribute to the family income, she also worked as a translator. Following Einar Tegen's academic appointments, the family moved to Lund in 1931 and Stockholm in 1937.

Captivated by a 1934 newspaper report from the German parliamentarian Gerhart Seger who had escaped from the concentration camp where he had been detained in 1933, Tegen wrote a film script on problems facing Germany's Jewish population titled En judisk tragedi (A Jewish Tragedy). Although it received an honorary mention in a Svensk Industri competition, it did not lead to a film but was published in book form in 1935 by Lunds Studenters Filmstudio with a foreword by Marika Stiernstedt. In November 1934, she contributed an article titled "Vem vil krig?" (Who Wants War?) to the local newspaper Lunds Dagblad.

During World War II, together with her husband Tegen visited the United States, recounting her experiences in Jorden runt i krigstid (Round the World in Wartime). To avoid hostilities, the couple travelled to San Francisco via Russia, Siberia and Japan. In 1945, as editor of De dödsdömda vittna (Testimonial of the Condemned), she sought to present accounts collected from Jewish refugees, in particular from those detained in concentration camps. Tegen was a member of various pacifist organizations including Women's International League for Peace and Freedom and Världssamling för fred (World Initiative for Peace).

Gunhild Tegen died in Stockholm on 24 May 1970.
