= Abela Gullbransson =

Abela Maria Gullbransson née Berglund (1775–1822) was a Swedish Christian revivalist and writer who was active in the early nineteenth century. Her religious views can be seen in her surviving correspondence as well as in her collection of edifying songs (Uppbyggliga sånger), published posthumously in several editions from 1823.

== Early life and family ==
Born in Varberg on 18 March 1775, Abela Maria Berglund was the daughter of the merchant Sven Berglund and his wife Johanna Christina née Brunius. She was one of the family's four daughters. Her education resulted from her bourgeois family upbringing and contacts with learned friends and relatives, including her cousin Carl Georg Brunius, an architecture professor. In 1795, she married the merchant Laurentius Gulbransson with whom she had three sons.

== Writings ==
Gullbransson appears to have corresponded frequently with her many friends, expressing her religious views. Referred to as "själavårdsbrev" (letters of spiritual welfare), her letters provide spiritual guidance, generally on the basis of well known Christian themes but on occasion offering more personalized advice as in the case of a letter to an upset young woman whom she encourages to remember Jesus' wounds and not to worry if she feels out of sorts or ill but rather to follow the Shepherd who knows his sheep. She calls for the observance of morning and evening prayers and for daily Bible reading. In general her letters to men are less emotive than those to women. Thanks to her correspondence, she proved to be a highly influential spiritual advocate on Sweden's west coast, often expressing ideas in line with those of the pietistic priest Henric Schartau or, rather less enthusiastically, with those of Jacob Otto Hoof.

A collection of Gullbransson's songs, now remembered as Uppbyggliga sånger och böner vid åtskilliga tillfällen (Edifying songs and prayers for various occasions), was first published a year after her death as Några andeliga sånger jemte ett bref till ett barn (Some spiritual songs together with a letter to a child) but subsequently appeared in at least ten different versions by the end of the century.

Abela Gullbransson died in Varberg on 17 November 1822.
