= Anna T. Nilsson =

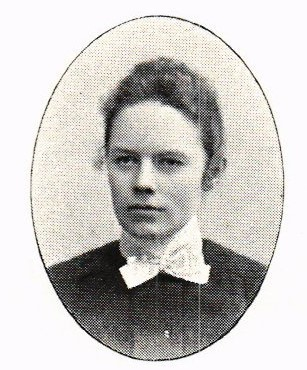
Anna T. Nilsson

Anna Alida Theresia Nilsson (1869–1947) was a Swedish drawing teacher, suffragist, and peace activist. Based in Malmö from 1902, she was active in many associations including those dealing with education, women's rights and the women's movement in Sweden. After the end of World War I, in 1919 she was active in the Swedish branch of the Women's International League for Peace and Freedom (WILPF). In 1923, together with Matilda Widegren and others, she established Nordiska Lärares Fredsförbund (Scandinavian Teachers’ Federation for Peace). After retiring from teaching in 1929, she travelled widely across Europe in support of the WILPF, distributing her pamphlet "ABC of the Peace Movement. Dates and Facts" in many different languages.

== Early life ==
Born in Södra Såm in Västergötland, Anna Alida Theresia Nilsson was the daughter of Hans Petter Nilsson, a textile executive, and his wife Albertina Juliana née Hulander. She was the fourth of the family's five children. In 1886, a year after her father died, she moved to Stockholm, studying at the HKS art college while living with her younger sister Ada who later became a physician and magazine editor. She graduated as a drawing instructor in 1890.

== Career ==
After teaching in Stockholm for two years, she moved to Malmö where she spent eight years at the technical college. After a year in Strängnäs, she returned to Malmö where she initially taught both at Misses Bunth's Girls School and at the realschool for boys. From 1910 until her retirement in 1929, she taught at the realschool.

Nilsson was active in several Malmö associations, serving on the boards of the suffragist federation Skåneförbundet för kvinnas politiska rösträtt, the ladies' Malmö Damsällskap, the liberal party's women's club Malmö Frisinnade Kvinnoklubb and the women's club and reading society Malmö Kvinnliga Klubb- och Läsesällskap.

After the end of World War I, in 1919 Nilsson was active in the Swedish branch of the Women's International League for Peace and Freedom (WILPF). In 1923, together with Matilda Widegren and representatives from Norway and Finland, she established Nordiska Lärares Fredsförbund (Scandinavian Teachers’ Federation for Peace). After retiring from teaching in 1929, she travelled widely across Europe in support of the WILPF, distributing her pamphlet "ABC of the Peace Movement. Dates and Facts" which had been translated into many different languages.

Anna T. Nilsson died in Malmö on 11 December 1947 and was buried in the Södra Säm churchyard.

== Publications ==
Nilsson's publications include:

- 1924: Data och fakta rörande fredsrörelsen (Data and facts in connection with the peace movement)
- 1933: Från tvenne slagfält - och från ett tredje (From two battlefields — and from a third)
- 1934: Fredsrörelsens ABC : data och fakta, second edition (ABC of the Peace Movement. Dates and Facts)
- 1945: Tio lyckliga år : på resa i fredsarbetets tjänst (Ten happy years: on a journey in the service of peace work)

== See also ==
- List of peace activists
