= Carl Rogberg =

Carl Elis Rogberg (born 1967) was Finance Director UK for Tesco Stores Limited in Britain. He currently is the Managing Director for Church Farm Industries Ltd., a company which specialises in Consultancy within retail and KPI driven business improvement.

== Early life and education ==
Rogberg was born in Sweden but moved with his family a couple of times to Germany. He also spent one year in Canada during the high school years. He has an MBA from the Stockholm School of Economics. He also is a reserve officer in the Swedish Army.

== Career ==
Rogberg worked at Kraft Foods from 1992 to 2000. In 2000 he founded MINT (now known as Easypark) where he worked until 2004. He then worked as chief financial officer for Education First in Hong Kong before joining Tesco in 2007. At Tesco, Rogberg was international finance director for Asia from 2007 to 2010 after which he became finance director of Tesco Lotus in Thailand. During his tenure in Thailand, the business grew significantly despite having to deal with the worst floods in modern Thai history. Rogberg oversaw the very large insurance claim, which is rumoured to have been settled in record time given its size. During his time in Thailand, he also served as the Chairman of Tesco Card Services, a consumer credit company set up as a joint venture between Tesco and Krungsri Bank. Furthermore, he led the IPO of the Tesco Lotus Growth Fund, a property fund listed on the Thai Stock Exchange in 2012. In 2012, he returned to the UK where he became the Finance Director for the UK business. In 2014, Rogberg was one of the Tesco executives suspended following the discovery of accounting irregularities. Rogberg was charged with false accounting and fraud on 9 September 2016 along with two fellow ex-Tesco executives, Christopher Bush and John Scouler. On 6 February 2018, the trial of Christopher Bush, John Scouler and Rogberg charged with fraud and false accounting has been abandoned due to Rogberg remaining in hospital and awaiting surgery after a heart attack.

In March 2018 The Serious Fraud Office said that it had decided to go ahead with a further trial with a date still to be finalised

A second trial of John Scouler and Christopher Bush collapsed in December 2018, where judge Sir John Royce ruled that there was no case to answer. The SFO made a hopeless appeal, and the permission for this appeal was rejected by three High Court judges. Carl Rogberg was subsequently acquitted on January 23 as the SFO offered no evidence. The four-and-a-half-year-long ordeal was widely and publicly criticised leaving both Tesco and the SFO a lot to answer for.

Rogberg speaks for innovation enterprise on "Financial Planning for Success in a Globalised Environment".

== Private life ==
Rogberg shares a home in Oxfordshire with his wife and son.
