= Anna Starbrink =

Swedish politician (born 1971)

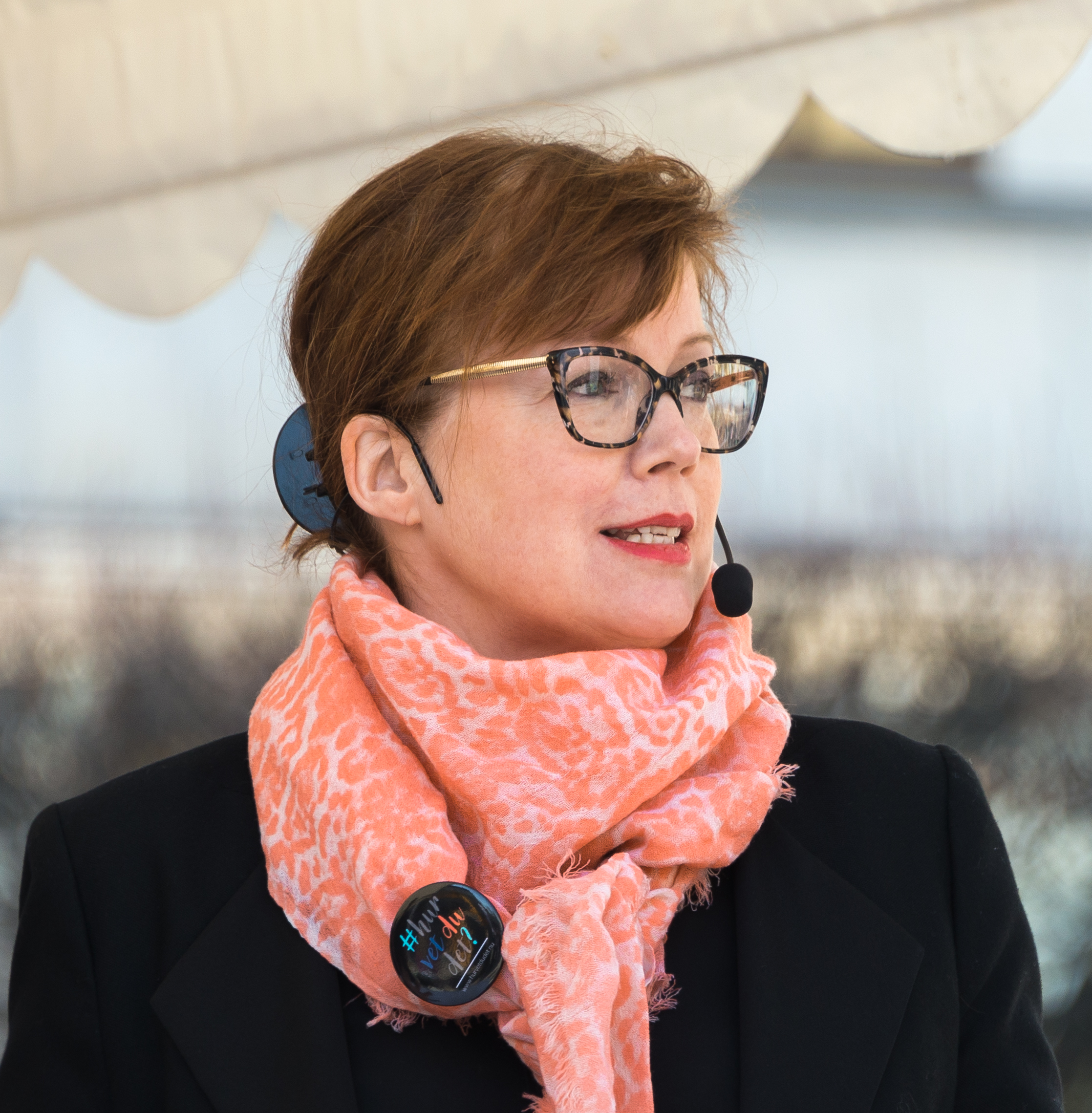
- Starbrink in 2018

Member of the Riksdag
- In office 2022–2025
- Constituency: Stockholm County

Personal details
- Born: 1971 (age 54–55) Kopparberg County, Sweden
- Party: Liberals
- Relations: Beppe Starbrink (uncle)

Anna Maj Ingegerd Starbrink (born 1971) is a Swedish politician from the Liberals who was a member of the Riksdag.

In February 2025, she was appointed Director General of the Swedish Civil Contingencies Agency (MSB). She resigned her seat in the Riksdag.

== See also ==
- List of members of the Riksdag, 2022–2026
