= Sofie Sarenbrant =

Swedish author (born 1978)

Anna Brita Sofie Sarenbrant
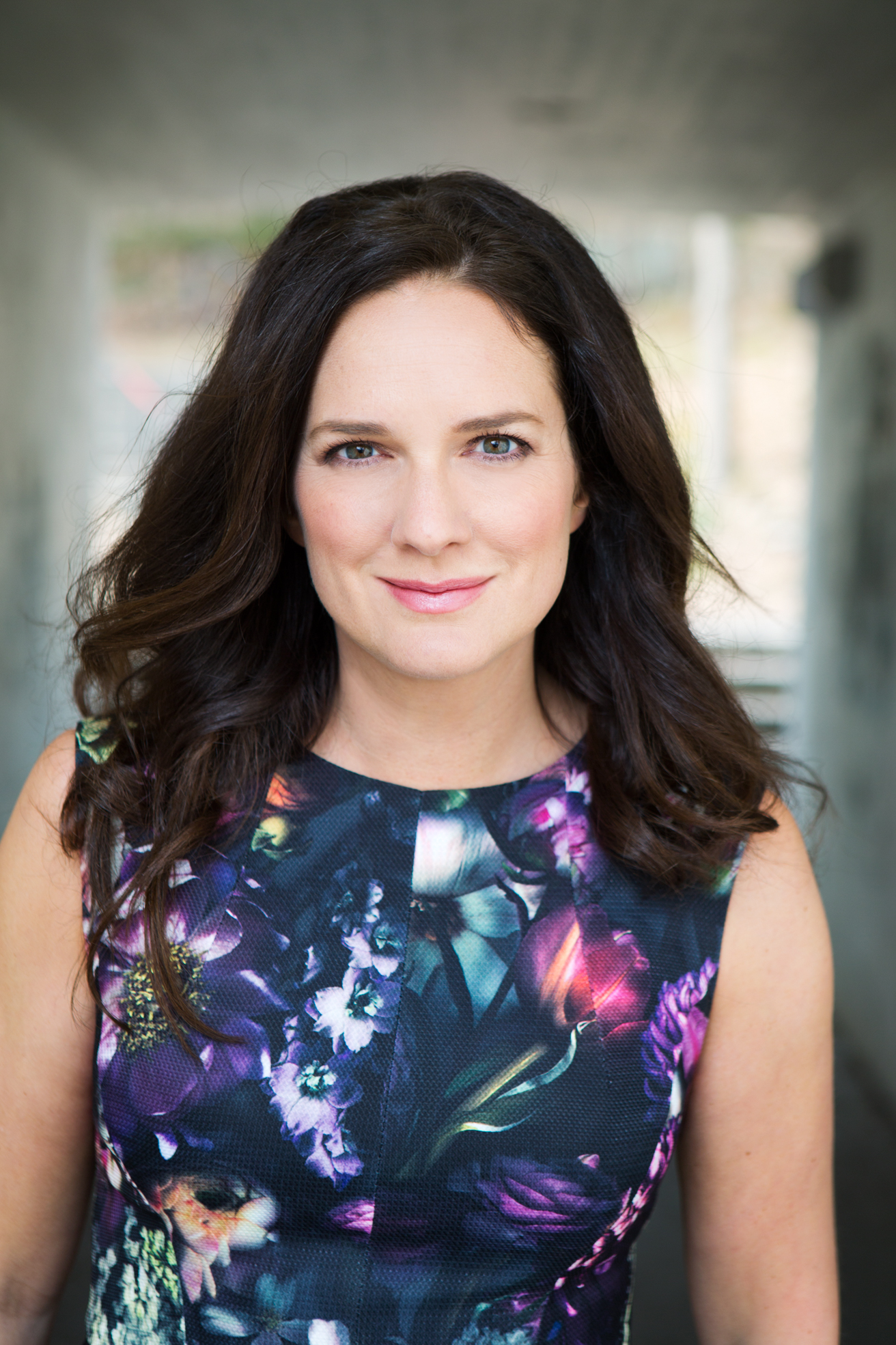
- Born: 4 January 1978 (age 48); Stockholm, Sweden
- Occupation: Writer
- Spouse: Tommy Sarenbrant
- Children: 2

Sofie Sarenbrant (born 1978) is a Swedish author. Her fictional books about police officer Emma Sköld have sold two million copies in fourteen countries.

== Biography ==
Sarenbrant was born in Stockholm on 4 January 1978. At the age of two her family moved to Narebo in Östergötland. After ending school she moved to Västervik where she studied media in high school. She began her journalism career as a freelance journalist for Veckorevyn, she has since worked for Expressen, Friskispressen and Amelia.

Sarenbrant debuted as an author with the book Vecka 36 in 2010. She is perhaps best known for her series of novels about the police officer Emma Sköld who was introduced in the book Vila i frid. Sarenbrand wanted the lead figure to be a young and ambitious woman, in comparison to the stereotypical image of a police officer as an alcoholic and being depressed. The third book in the series Visning pågår became the best-selling crime novel of 2015, and Tiggaren, the fifth part of the book series became the second best-selling crime novel of 2017 in Sweden.

The book Bakom din rygg which was published in 2017, was the first in a series of three books about three hairdressers in Östermalm. In 2019, the seventh book about Emma Sköld named Skamvrån was published.

== Bibliography ==
- Vecka 36. Malmö: Damm. 2010. Libris ISBN 978-91-7351-682-2
- I stället för dig. Malmö: Damm. 2011. Libris ISBN 978-91-7351-723-2
- Vila i frid. Damm förlag. 2012. Libris ISBN 978-91-7351-833-8
- Andra andningen. Damm förlag. 2013. Libris ISBN 978-91-7537-012-5
- Visning pågår. Damm förlag. 2014. Libris ISBN 9789174751543
- Avdelning 73. Massolit förlag. 2015. ISBN 9789187783210
- Tiggaren. Bookmark förlag. 2016. ISBN 9789188171092
- Bakom din rygg. Bookmark förlag. 2017. ISBN 9789188171108
- Syndabocken. Bookmark förlag. 2018. ISBN 978-91-88545-57-2
- Skamvrån. Bookmark förlag. 2019. ISBN 978-91-88859-16-7
