= Maja Forsslund =

Swedish folklorist and women's rights activist

Ingeborg Augusta Maria Forsslund
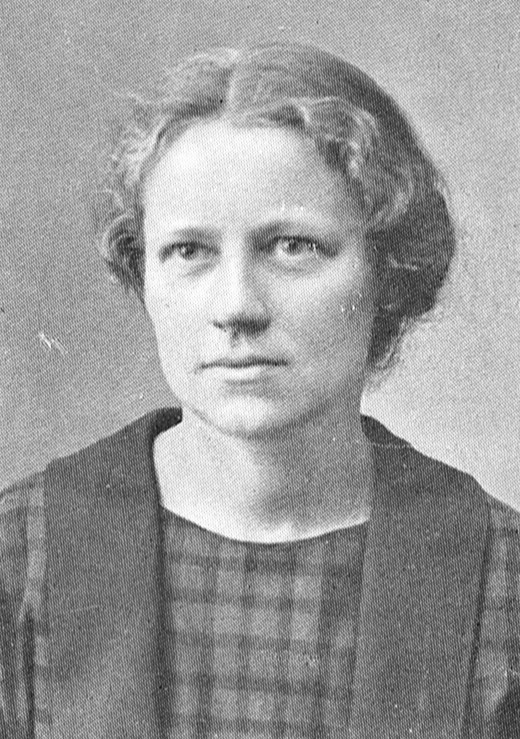
- Born: November 20, 1878; Kopparberg, Sweden
- Died: November 2, 1967 (aged 88); Kopparberg, Sweden
- Other name: Maja
- Occupations: Folklorist, women's rights activist

Ingeborg Augusta Maria (Maja) Forsslund (20 November 1878 – 2 November 1967) was a Swedish folklorist and women's rights activist. She is remembered for enthusiastically collecting folk material in and around Kopparberg in central Sweden, paying special attention to religious folk memories. The local educational association has preserved her findings in its Örebro County's folk history archives as well as in similar archives in Uppsala.

== Early life ==
Born on 20 November 1878 in Kopparberg in central Sweden, Ingeborg Augusta Maria Forsslund was the daughter of the prosperous wholesale merchant Carl Frederik Forsslund and his wife Augusta Christina née Ôhman. The only girl among the family's four children, she attended Kopparberg's elementary school (folkskola).

== Career ==
Forsslund was a member of the local branch of the Swedish Association for Women's Suffrage as described in the chapters she contributed to the local information book Från Ljusnarsbergen (1921). Interested in developing education facilities for ordinary people, she not only wrote books and gave lectures but in 1919 was the driving force behind the establishment of Kopparbergs-Ljusnarsbergs Folkbildningsförening, a folk education association. As books were acquired with assistance from the church, Forsslund put some order into their presentation, preparing the way for the Ljusnarberg Library.

In 1920, as a result of a course on local history and culture given by students from Uppsala and of a crafts exhibition held in Kopparberg, with an emphasis on religious accounts the folk education association began to collect folk memories to be preserved for the future. After the folklore scholar Carl Wilhelm von Sydow emphasized the importance of keeping notes, Forsslund started to undertake collecting expeditions, cycling energetically from one farm to another, and carefully recording the results of her interviews. The local educational association has preserved her findings in its Örebro County's folk history archives as well as in similar archives in Uppsala. In addition to her contributions to Från Ljusnarsbergen, in 1960 Forsslund published accounts of her interviews in the local information book Ljusnars-Kopparberg: en hembygdsbok. Her contribution titled En färd genom Kopparbergs kyrkby för hundra år sedan (A Journey through the Village of Kopparberg a Hundred Years Ago) presents the activities of her ancestors in the local mining community.

Maja Forsslund died in Kopparberg on 2 November 1967 and was buried in Ljusnarsberg Churchyard.
