= Swedish Civil Defence and Resilience Agency =

Government agency of Sweden

- Myndigheten för civilt försvar

Agency overview
- Formed: 1 January, 2009
- Preceding agencies: Swedish Emergency Management Agency; Swedish National Board of Psychological Defence; Swedish Rescue Services Agency
- Headquarters: Karlstad
- Employees: 1,000
- Annual budget: SEK 1.2 billion (2019)
- Minister responsible: Carl-Oskar Bohlin, (Minister for Civil Defence)
- Agency executives: Mikael Frisell, (Director-General); Anna Starbrink, (Overdirectorl)
- Parent agency: Ministry of Defence
- Website: www.mcf.se/en/

The Swedish Civil Defence and Resilience Agency (Swedish: Myndigheten för civilt försvar, MCF), is a Swedish administrative authority, organised under the Ministry of Defence. The agency is responsible for issues concerning civil protection, public safety, emergency management and civil defence. Responsibility refers to measures taken before, during and after an emergency or crisis. MCF work in close cooperation with the municipalities, the county councils, other authorities, organisations and the private sector to achieve increased safety and security at all levels of society. This is done through education, support, training exercises, regulation and supervision.

The agency covers the whole spectrum of contingencies; from everyday road traffic accidents and fires, up to chemical emergencies, power cuts and other technical failures. Additionally, more serious emergencies, such as bomb threats and other antagonistic attacks, epidemics, natural disasters and war. In most cases, the responsibility for on-scene action does not lie with the Civil Defence and Resilience Agency but with municipal rescue services, law enforcement agencies or other agencies.

== History ==
The Swedish Civil Contingencies Agency (Swedish: Myndigheten för samhällsskydd och beredskap) was established 1 January 2009, when Swedish Rescue Services Agency (Swedish: Räddningsverket), the Swedish Emergency Management Agency (Swedish: Krisberedskapsmyndigheten) and the Swedish National Board of Psychological Defence (Swedish: Styrelsen för psykologiskt försvar) were merged into one body. In 2022 the Agency for Psychological Defence was established as a separate agency.

During the 2018 Sweden wildfires, Sweden requested help from European Union through the Emergency Response Coordination Centre at the European Commission's Directorate-General for European Civil Protection and Humanitarian Aid Operations department. Sweden received help from Estonia, France, Finland, Germany, Italy, Lithuania, Poland and Portugal. The help included firefighters, equipment and water bombing aircraft.

From 1 January 2026 the agency was renamed as the Swedish Civil Defence and Resilience Agency.

== Organisation ==
MCF is based in Stockholm, Karlstad, Kristinehamn and Ljung. MCF also has some colleges in Sandö, Revinge and Rosersberg. The agency has about 850 employees, led by Director-General Charlotte Petri Gornitzka. It's organised into five departments: Risk & Vulnerability Reduction Department, Emergency Management Development Department, Coordination and Operations Department, Evaluation and Monitoring Department and the Administration Department.

== Directors-General ==
- 2009–2017: Helena Lindberg
- 2018–2021: Dan Eliasson
- 2021: Camilla Asp (acting)
- 2021–2024: Charlotte Petri Gornitzka
- 2024–: Mikael Frisell

=== Assistant Director General ===
- 2025–: Anna Starbrink

== See also ==
- Ministry of Justice (Sweden)
