= Carl Georg Rogberg =

Swedish priest and university teacher

- Portrait of Rogberg c. 1830 by Johan Adolf Sevén
- Born: 6 August 1789
- Died: 28 January 1834 (aged 44); Uppsala
- Occupations: Priest, Teacher

Carl Georg Rogberg (6 August 1789 – 28 January 1834) was a Swedish priest and university teacher. Rogberg was born in Växjö. He matriculated at Uppsala University in 1807 and studied at the faculty of theology, graduating in 1818. He started to take seminaries to become a vicar at Heliga Trefaldighets congregation in Uppsala in 1823. In 1828 he became a member of the Bible commission, which was working on a new translation of the Bible into Swedish and in 1831 he became professor of pastoral theology in Uppsala, where he died.
