= Suzanne Axell =

Swedish journalist and TV presenter

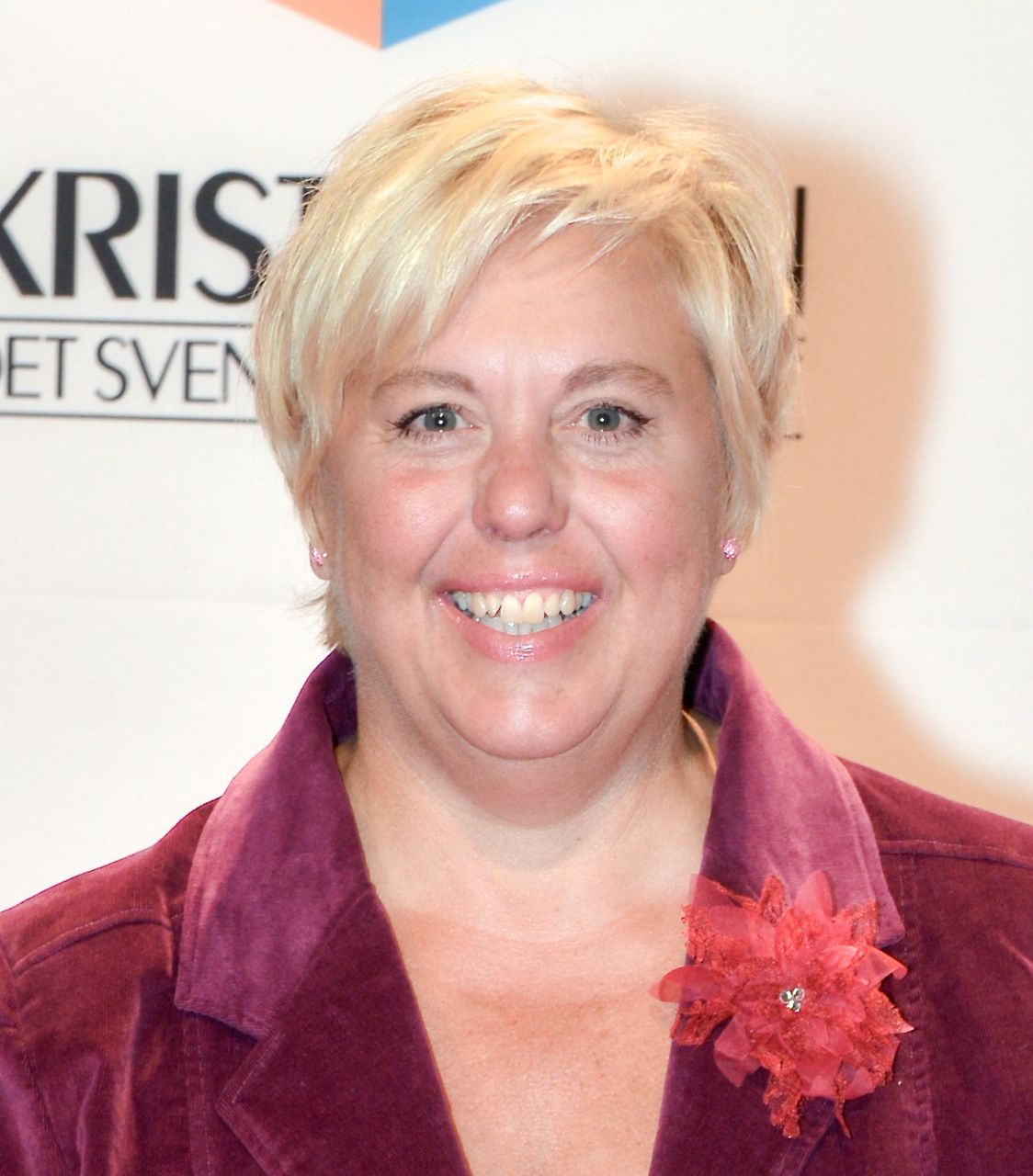
- Axell in 2013
- Born: 27 December 1955 (age 70); Stockholm, Sweden
- Occupations: Television presenter, journalist
- Known for: Fråga doktorn
- Partner: Jörgen Wedebrand

Suzanne Axell (born 27 December 1955) is a Swedish journalist and television presenter. She has presented SVTs Fråga doktorn and she has worked as a journalist for Expressen, Aftonbladet and Arbetet. She has also worked for local radio in Uppland, Stockholm and for Sveriges Radios P4 station.

== Career ==
In 1980, she started her career in media. For ten years she worked as a crime reporter for Expressen and as an entertainment reporter for Arbetet. In 1990, she turned down a job at Aftonbladet to start working for local radio stations. She presented Parasollet at Radio Uppland, and she continued to work at that station for five years.

After working at Radio Stockholm in her hometown Stockholm and Sveriges Radio, she started presenting the SVT daily show Go'kväll in 1999, recorded in Norrköping. She presented over 300 shows. Since 2003, she is the presenter of the health facts show Fråga doktorn on the same channel. Axel co-wrote the book Fråga doktorn which was published in 2005. In it she also interviewed Royal Dramatic Theatre actress Marie Göranzon.

Axell has received an award from the Chernobyl foundation in Russia, for her reports about Natasha Andersson and her work for children from the radiation damaged area surrounding Chernobyl. Axell has competed three times in the SVT quiz show På spåret in 2004, 2005 and 2006. On the first two occasions she reached the semifinals along with her teammate Peder Lamm.
