= Gunila Ambjörnsson =

Swedish director, author, playwright

Elsa Gunila Ambjörnsson
- Born: Elsa Gunilla Falklind; 12 March 1938; Kalmar, Sweden
- Died: 16 November 2013; Stockholm, Sweden
- Education: University of Gothenburg (MA)
- Occupations: Writer; film director; producer; children's book author; playwright; theater director
- Known for: Co-founding Fria Teatern; writing children's books; producing TV and film
- Notable work: Skräpkultur åt barnen (1968); Ville, Valle och Viktor (1970-1972)
- Spouse: Ronny Ambjörnsson
- Parents: Otto Falklind (father); Gunborg Lundgren (mother)

Gunila Ambjörnsson (12 March 1938 – 16 November 2013) was a Swedish author, playwright, and director. She wrote 20+ books and directed 5+ films and two TV shows. She is best known for directing the show Ville, Valle och Viktor (1970-1972).

== Personal life ==
On 12 March 1938, Ambjörnsson was born in Kalmar, Sweden to Otto Falklind and Gunborg Lundgren. She had a brother named Hans. Ambjörnsson spent her childhood in Gothenberg, Sweden. Growing up, she spent her summers on Fårö writing.

Ambjörnsson graduated with a Master of Philosophy from the University of Gothenberg in 1962. At the university, she worked as an editor at Götheborgske Spionen, the student newspaper.

Ambjörnsson married Ronny Ambjörnsson in 1958. They had one child, Ola Ambjörnsson. They later divorced in 1973.

== Career ==
In 1966, Ambjörnsson began working for Sveriges Television, the national television broadcaster of Sweden. She also taught directing and screenwriting at the Dramatiska Institutet.

In the late 1960s, Ambjörnsson went on a trip to Czechoslovakia and "was greatly impressed by the high quality of the children’s television, films, books, and plays that she saw there." She wanted to improve the media for Sweden's youth since she believed "children deserved to be treated as competent and aware individuals."

Ambjörnsson published her first book Truls in 1967. Her big break came the next year with Skräpkultur åt barnen. The book described ongoing debates in children's media and proposed solutions to the "trash culture" she believed children were receiving in Sweden at the time. She would go on to write more than 20 fiction and non-fiction books.

In the late 1960s, Ambjörnsson also collaborated on the creation of Fria Teatern, one of Sweden's first independent theatre companies. She worked as a playwright and director in the early productions of the company. She hired some company members in her later films.

Ambjörnsson had her first film roles in 1970. She served as a producer for the movie Veronica: en sjörövarberättelse, and as a producer and writer for the TV series, Ville, Valle och Viktor. A spin-off of Beppe's World House, Ville, Valle och Viktor would run for two seasons and nine holiday specials. Discography for the show would win a 1972 Grammis Award for Children's Record of the Year.

She left Sveriges Television in 1985. Through the late 1980s until her death, she worked as a freelance author and director.

One of her later books, Tigerhjärta, also was released to positive reviews. Ying Toijer-Nilsson for Svenska Dagbladet described the book as having "evocative staging", adding that "As soon as the book was finished, I took hold of it again, then with 'Macbeth' in my hand to really enjoy both the Scottish and the Gotland atmosphere. And, of course, the author's skill in intertwining several cultural layers into an exciting contemporary story."

Ambjörnsson's last book, Från de inställda rymningarnas tid, was published the year of her death in 2013.

== Bibliography ==
=== Fiction ===
- Truls (1967)
- Barnteater - en klassfråga (1970)
- Tiga, tala, handla: en antologi med texter från vår tid (1971)
- Läsning för barn: orientering i dagens barnlitteratur (1971)
- Här kommer Ville & Valle & Viktor (1972)
- Den mystiske mand slår til: en bog om Ville og Valle og Viktor (1976) – Translation of Here comes Ville & Valle & Viktor
- Pappa - en kärlekshistoria: en antologi (1986)
- Spindelvävsridån (1990)
- Huset Silvercronas gåta (1992)
- Trädet och tiden (1999)
- Berättelser från andra sidan (2000)
- Tidens fånge (2000)
- Tigerhjärta (2003)
- Från de inställda rymningarnas tid (2013)

==== Children's fiction ====
- Ivar den förskräcklige: en storebrors berättelse (1996)
- Vilse i tiden (1998)
- Silverapan (2004)
- Magic.circle.com (2008)

=== Non-fiction ===
- Skräpkultur åt barnen (1968)
- Folkhemsprinsessorna: om att växa upp på 50-talet (1987)
- Äventyrerskor (2001)
- Vart tog Fredrika vägen?: en bok om Flickläroverket och flickorna (2004)
- Tidsandans krumbukter (2007)

== Filmography ==
Year	Name	English Name	Medium	Role
1970	Veronica: en sjörövarberättelse	Veronica: a pirate story	Movie	Producer
1970	Ville, Valle och Viktor upptäcker Sverige	Ville, Valle and Viktor discover Sweden	TV season	Writer, Producer
1972	Ville, Valle och Viktor och den mystiske mannen	Ville, Valle and Viktor and the mysterious man	TV season	Writer, Producer
1974	Huset Silfvercronas gåta	The Riddle of the House of Silfvercrona	TV Series	Director, Writer
1980	Sista varningen	Last warning	Movie	Writer, Cinematographer
1980	Kvällen före dagen efter	The evening before the next day	Video	Director, Writer
1985	Rörande granars inverkan på människors sinnesfrid	The impact of touching firs on people's peace of mind	Movie	Director
1985	1985. Vad hände katten i råttans år?	1985. What happened to the cat in the year of the rat?	Movie	Director
1988	Det finns för lite indianer	There are too few Indians	Movie	Director, Writer
1991	Drömspår: En film om längtan	Dream track: A film about longing	Movie	Director, Writer, Editor
1993	Sagan om pappan som bakade prinsessor	The story of the father who baked princesses	Movie	Director, Writer
1994	Granskogen i våra hjärtan - en bondfilm	The spruce forest in our hearts - a peasant film	Movie	Director, Writer
1995	Stannar du så springer jag	If you stop, I'll run	Movie	Director, Writer
