= Charlotta Lagerberg Thunes =

Swedish children's author (born 1972)

- Born: Charlotta Elisabet Albinsson; 1972 (age 53–54); Högsbo, Gothenburg, Sweden
- Education: Linnaeus University (Växjö University)
- Occupations: Children's author, behavioral scientist, lecturer
- Writing career
- Genres: Children's literature, fiction
- Notable works: Popcornmannen Poppe series, Orkidébarnet
- Notable awards: Årets driftigaste HSP-person (2018)
- Website: www.charlottalagerbergthunes.se

Charlotta Elisabet Lagerberg Thunes (born 1972) is a Swedish children's book author, behavioral scientist and lecturer. She wrote a book series featuring the character Popcornmannen Poppe, which focuses on emotional intelligence for children.

== Biography ==
Lagerberg Thunes was born in the Högsbo parish of Gothenburg. She has a background in social work, having worked with vulnerable children, youth, and adults in schools, municipal authorities, and for the children's rights organization BRIS.

In addition to her training as a behavioral scientist, she studied creative writing at Linnaeus University (formerly Växjö University).

Lagerberg Thunes also works as a freelance writer for various publications and conducts author visits at institutions such as the Alfie Atkins Cultural Centre (Alfons Åbergs kulturhus) in Gothenburg.

Her adult fiction includes the novel Bara för din skull (Just for Your Sake), which addresses social exclusion in Gothenburg. Her novel Orkidébarnet (The Orchid Child) is the first in a four-part series exploring high sensitivity (HSP) and shame. In 2018, she was named "Most Driven HSP Person of the Year" by HSP Sweden for her commitment to spreading knowledge about sensitivity and vulnerability.

== Awards and honors ==
- Skandia Foundation "Ideas for Life" Grant (2014)
- Helge Ax:son Johnson Foundation Grant (2015, 2016)
- Swedish Authors' Fund (Författarfonden) (2014)
- HSP Person of the Year, HSP Sweden (2017, 2018)
- Längmanska Culture Foundation Grant (2020)
- Emotion Visionary of the Year, Känslogalan (2021)

== Bibliography ==
Notable works from her bibliography include:

- Popcornmannen Poppe (2005)
- Poppe och hans vänner (2005)
- Bara för din skull (2014)
- Orkidébarnet (2017)
- Fjärilsdrömmar (2019)
- Sorgmanteln (2020)
- Vingklippt (2023)
- Dansa mig till kärleken (2026)
