= Beppe Starbrink =

Swedish journalist and television presenter

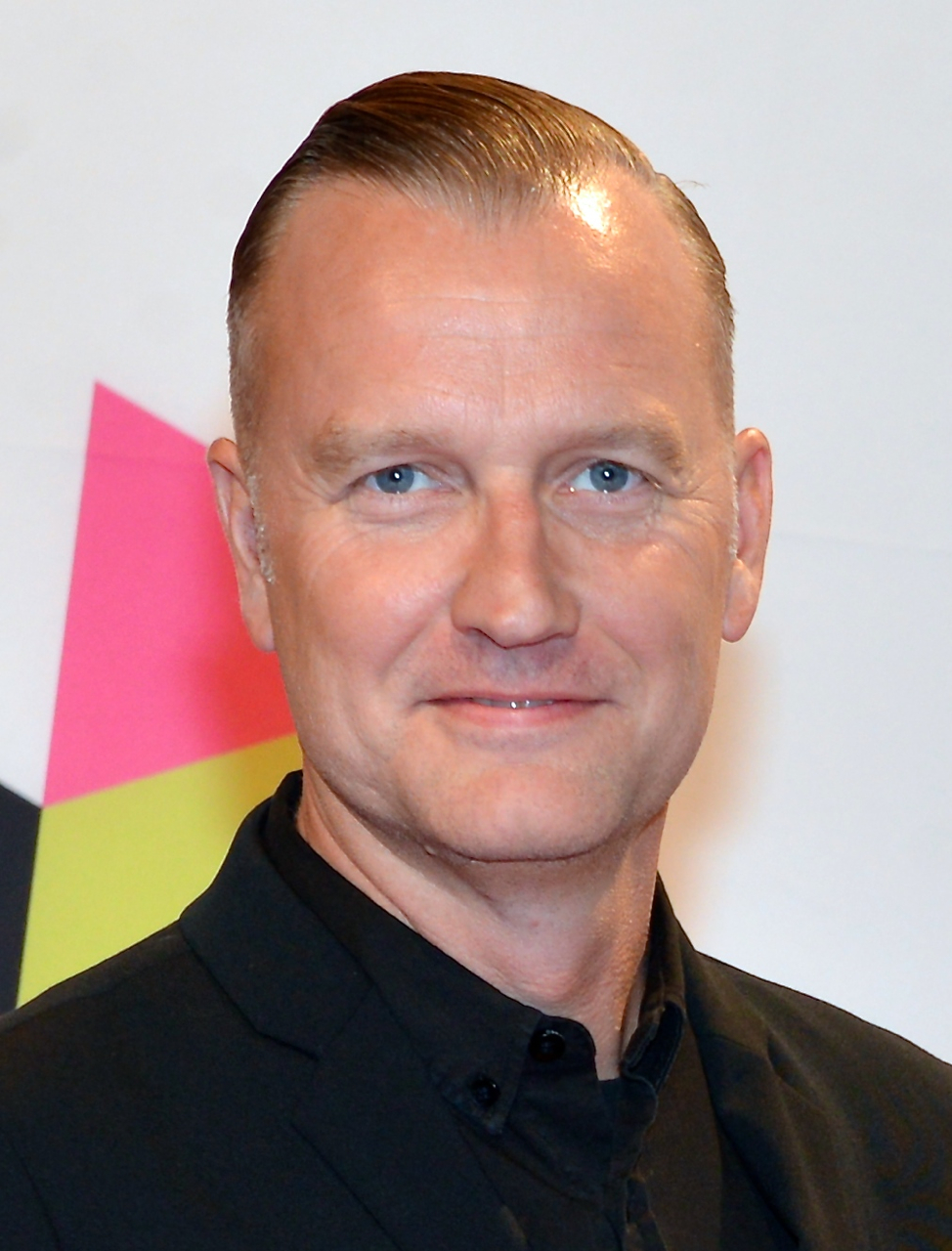
- Beppe Starbrink (2013)
- Born: Beppe Bengt Erik Starbrink; 3 April 1966 (age 60); Jönköping, Sweden
- Occupation: Television presenter
- Relatives: Anna Starbrink (niece)

Beppe Bengt Erik Starbrink (born 3 April 1966) is a Swedish journalist and television presenter, mainly working for Sveriges Television, currently presenting Go'kväll.

== Biography ==
Starbrink grew up in Lekeryd and today lives in Umeå. He studied Cultural Sociology and Journalism at Umeå University. His practice in journalism started at the student radio.

He has practiced different jobs such as an excavator operator, a librarian, a waiter, a writer, a script writer, a barman, a radio actor and at last a program manager and a TV reporter. Since 1993, he has worked on RadioRix, the first private radio of that time. And then he received the invitation to become a program manager on a regional television program on TV4 Botnia (now TV4 Västerbotten). He began working there in 1997 but later he worked as a newsreader, a reporter and an editor on TV. Since 2002, he has worked on SVT in different programs.

He works for SVT where he presents Go'kväll, he has previously presented Finns blått?. He has been a reporter for the shows Plus, Existens, Sverige! and for the SVT news broadcasts.

He lives in Umeå. He is married and has two daughters.
