= Rosberg =

Origin
- Origin: Sweden
- Meaning: rose hill
- Region of origin: Sweden

Rosberg is a Swedish surname.

It may refer to:

- Rosberg racing family
  - Keke Rosberg, father of Nico, former Finnish Formula One racing driver and 1982 Formula One World Champion
  - Nico Rosberg, son of Keke, former German Formula One racing driver and 2016 Formula One World Champion
    - Rosberg X Racing, Extreme E team formed by Nico Rosberg
- Christer Rosberg, Swedish soccer player
- Mikey Madison Rosberg, American actress

== See also ==
- Team Rosberg, a racing team owned by the Rosberg racing family
