= Anja Kontor =

Swedish journalist and television presenter

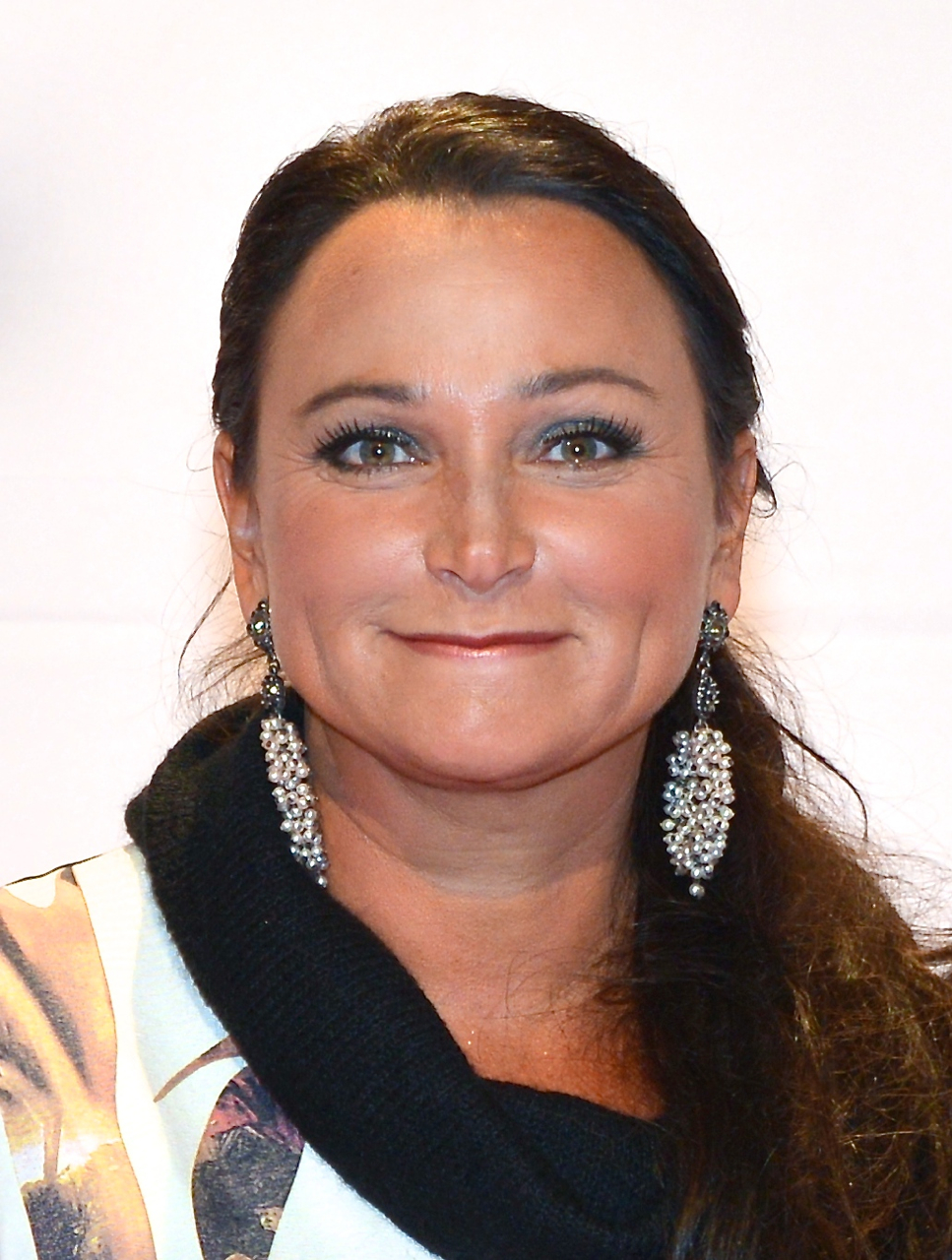
- Kontor in 2013
- Born: Anja Christina Kontor; 18 December 1964 (age 61); Uppsala, Sweden
- Occupations: Journalist, television presenter

Anja Christina Kontor (born 18 December 1964) is a Swedish journalist and television presenter. She started as a freelancer for Sveriges Radio in 1987. She started working at Sveriges Television and started presenting Go'kväll when the show was first broadcast from studios in Sundsvall, Umeå and Norrköping. Kontor worked as a presenter, producer and reporter for the show in 1997–2010. Between 1995 and 1997, she also helped launch the TV4 Uppland local news broadcasts, where she handled several different tasks. At the same time Kontor also produced regular features on TV4 News and Nyhetsmorgon. Kontor has also filled in and helped presenting episodes of Sveriges Radio show P4 Extra and Karlavagnen.

In 2013, she presented her own show on SVT called När livet vänder, the fourth series started airing in March 2016.
