= Sara Holmsten =

Swedish writer (1713–1795)

Sara Holmsten (1713–1795) was a Swedish memoirist and member of the Moravian Church also known as the Evangelical Brotherhood.

== Life and work ==
Sara Holmsten was the daughter of a farmer living on the Baltic island of Åland, (then Sweden but now Finland), but the devastation wrought by the Russian Army during the Great Nordic War (1700–1721) reduced her to beggary. By becoming a domestic worker and factory employee in Stockholm, she was able to take care of herself sufficiently. In the 1750s, she became a member of the Moravian church in Stockholm. In that capacity, she eventually took employment with leading members of the congregation.

When she was 68, again destitute, she took up residence at Johannes’s poorhouse in Stockholm. At 72, she began dictating and writing her autobiography describing her experiences as a Swede as was the custom of the Moravian Church at the time. According to Haettner Aurelius, "All members of the congregation in the Moravian Church were therefore obliged to write their 'life stories', which were then read out at the member’s funeral." Holmsten's autobiography was among 35 similar ones that have been preserved from women who survived the second half of the 1700s.

Her autobiography published in 1787 is now regarded as being among the most historically interesting of contemporary Swedish works of that kind.

She has been cited as a notably reliable source for information about life at that time, including the Russian torching of a forest where she was hiding with other refugees. "Then we went further, to seek out other people who had hidden in the forest, but before we knew it, we were surrounded by forest fires that the Russians lit; when I knew (had) perished in the morass, if the Savior had not so directed that a wife came to my aid and at great risk of life brought me to my mother."

She died in Stockholm on 29 July 1795 at 82.
