= Christina Rogberg =

Swedish author and courtier

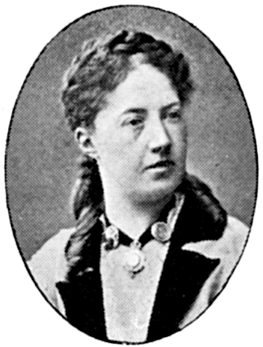
Christina Rogberg

Christina Gustava Lovisa Rogberg (26 October 1832, in Stockholm – 22 December 1907, in Stockholm) was a Swedish author and courtier.

She was the daughter of Olof Erland Rogberg (1787–1863), chaplain of the Swedish court. She was appointed kammarfru (ladies' maid) to Queen Désirée Clary in 1857, and to the same position in the household of Queen Louise in 1862. She became Louise's favorite and confidant. In 1869, she was promoted to the post of lectrice or reader to Louise, who was a published translator.

She is best remembered as the author of a book about her life at court, Strödda anteckningar ur drottning Lovisas lif ('Scattered Notes from the life of Queen Louise'), which was published in 1873.

== Sources ==
- Sveriges dödbok 1901–2013
- Svenskt konstnärslexikon del IV sid 501, Allhems Förlag, Malmö. LIBRIS-ID:8390296
