= Pontus Wikner =

Swedish philosopher

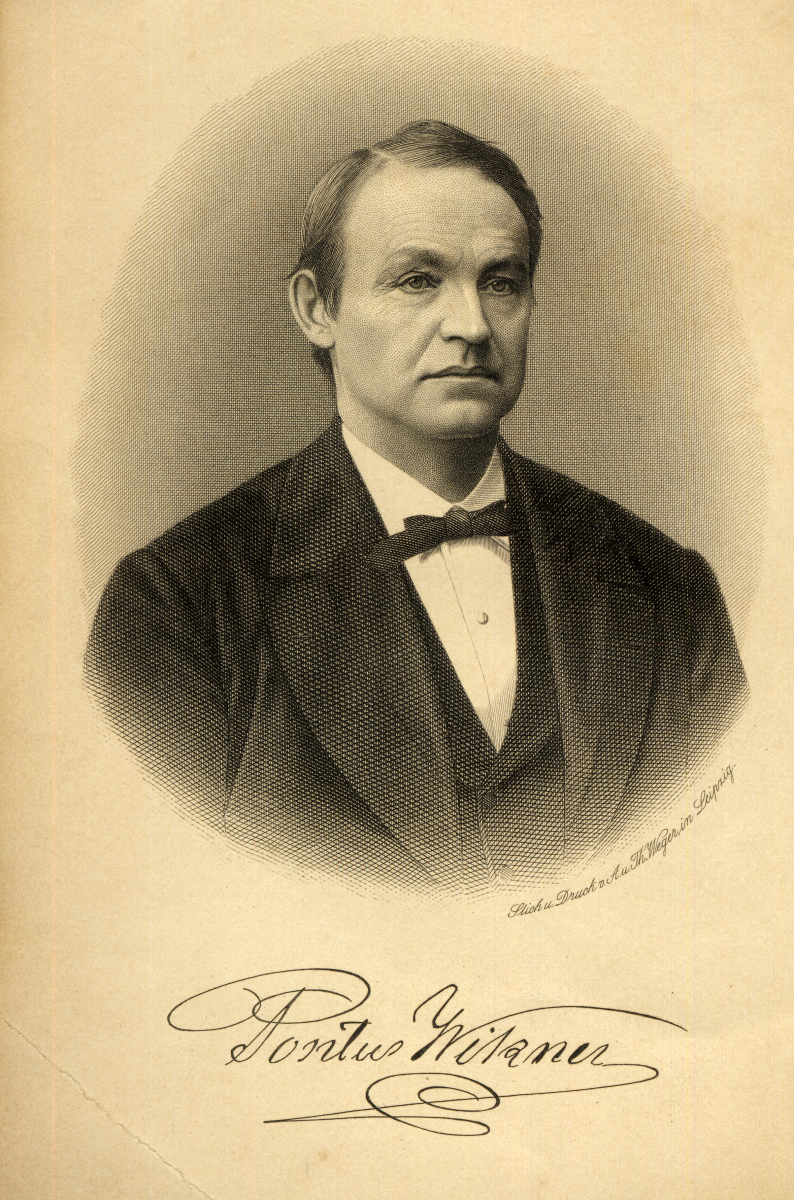
Carl Pontus Wikner

Carl Pontus Wikner (19 May 1837 – 16 May 1888) was a Swedish lecturer in philosophy and professor of aesthetics in Oslo (Christiania) from 1884.

Wikner's contribution to homosexual history consists foremostly of producing the first description of the problematics about homosexual identity and the coming-out process. He deposited for future research at the medical faculty in Uppsala his Psychological Self-Confessions from 1879 and diaries from 1853 to 1871. According to his own wishes, they were not published before his wife and sons - the nearest members of the family - had died.

== Biography ==
Wikner was the son of the mill inspector Peter Wikner and his wife Sara Larsson. He grew up at the Barracks in Foss parish. There, the local community association has restored Pontus Wiknergården and uses it as a local community farm. At the age of three and a half, he learned to read. At the age of seven, he threw himself into biblical history in German and within a few more years he was immersed in English and Latin grammar. In the summer of 1871 he married his childhood friend Ida Weinberg (1837–1910). They had two sons, Ernst and Hugo. For Wikner, the marriage was a marriage of convenience, because he was gay.

After studying at Uppsala University, he became an associate professor of theoretical philosophy and senior lecturer there. In 1884, he was appointed professor of philosophy at Royal Frederick University in Oslo (Christiania) and took up this chair the following year.

Towards the end of his life, Wikner wrote that he was suffering from four chronic ailments. One of them - too big a heart - he did not mention without a certain pride. He died just before he turned 51 years old. Wikner is buried in Uppsala's old cemetery. In 1902, a grave was unveiled that was erected in his honor, when a speech was given by J.A. Eklund, later bishop of Karlstad diocese.

== Philosophy ==
As a philosopher, Wikner was influenced by Christopher Jacob Boström, but asserted his own independent view, partly in scholarly writings, partly also in more popular, rarely well-written works. Among the latter are a series of philosophical and religious lectures, such as The Sacrifice of Culture, The Narcissus Saga and some historical novels influenced by Viktor Rydberg's style art, excellent for richness of thought, beauty of form and a warm religious spirit: My mother's testament, Mantegna's angel.

Wikner was a member of the Nameless Society. Wikner's writing has had a far-reaching and profound influence. He also had a Christian creed.

== The Diaries ==
Eighty years after Wikner's death, following the deaths of his wife and two sons, his private notes and diaries were compiled into the work Psychological Confessions, which revealed his homosexuality: first boys, and later youths and men. Wikner wrote that he had penned the frank confessions for the benefit of fellow homosexuals: "I must speak: I must cry from my grave for mercy for my brothers."
