= List of Uppsala University nations =

This is a list of student nations at Uppsala University in Sweden. The tradition of nations at the university is practically as old as the university itself.

The list is always sorted in accordance with a time-honoured order based on the age of the diocese of the area that the nation was named after.

== Active nations ==
Nation	Foundation year	Inspektor	Acronym	House
Stockholms nation	c. 1649	Prof. Coco Norén	Stocken	Built by the nation in 1848.
Uplands nation	1642	Prof. Björn Victor		Bought by the nation in 1825. Parts from 1770.
Gästrike-Hälsinge nation	c. 1646	Prof. Anders Virtanen	GH	Built by the nation in 1880.
Östgöta nation	1646	Prof. Ulf Pettersson	ÖG	Built by the nation in 1885.
Västgöta nation	1639	Prof. Bertil Wiman	VG	Bought by the nation in 1825. Medieval basement.
Södermanlands-Nerikes nation	1595	Per Ström	Snerikes	Built by the nation in 1897.
Västmanlands-Dala nation	1639	Prof. Johan Sundström	V-Dala	Built by the nation in 1965.
Smålands nation	1663	Prof. Mattias Dahlberg		Built by the nation in 1957.
Göteborgs nation	1667	Prof. Per Hansson		Built by the nation in 1960.
Kalmar nation	1663	Prof. Anders Ahlén		Built by the nation in 1988.
Värmlands nation	1660	Prof. Lars Burman		Built by the nation in 1930.
Norrlands nation	1646	Prof. Cecilia Pahlberg		Built by the nation in 1889.
Gotlands nation	c. 1663	Prof. Lars Magnusson		Built by the nation in 1957.

== Other nations ==
- Finska nationen i Uppsala. Student society for Finnish students founded in 1998, using the same name as the historic Finnish nation.

== Former nations ==
- Adelsnationen (1768–1780). Historic nation for the nobility.
- Ångermanländska nationen (1646–1800). The oldest predecessor of Norrlands nation. Merged with Västerbottniska nationen into Bottniska nationen.
- Bottniska nationen (1800–1827). Merged with Medelpado–Jämtländska nationen into Norrlands nation.
- Finska nationen, (1673–1835). Former Finnish student nation in Uppsala. Split from Österbottniska nationen.
- Fjärdhundralands nation (?–1829). Merged with Uplands nation.
- Gästrike nation (?–1811). Merged with Hälsinge Nation.
- Germanska nationen (c. 1663–?). Historic nation for German students.
- Hälsinge nation (c. 1646–1811). Merged with Gästrike Nation.
- Livländska nationen (c. 1663–?). Historic nation for Baltic students.
- Medelpado–Jämtländska nationen (1685–1827). Split from Ångermanländska nationen and later merged into Norrlands nation.
- Närkes nation (?–1805). Merged with Södermanlands nation.
- Österbottniska nationen (c. 1656–c. 1680). Merged with Finska nationen.
- Roslags nation (?–1829). Merged with Uplands nation.
- Skånska nationen (1757–?)
- Södermanlands nation (1595–1805). Merged with Närkes nation.
- Västerbottniska nationen (1647–1800). Merged with Ångermanländska nationen into Bottniska nationen, later Norrlands nation.
- Skånelandens nation (1970s–2010) Student society founded in the 1970s by students who wanted to avoid obligatory membership in the nations. Had no membership fee and no activities and ceased to exist when membership of nations became voluntarily in the summer of 2010.

== See also ==
- Nations at Swedish universities
