= Birkarlarna =

Birkarlarna is a fraternal society based in Uppsala, Sweden, affiliated with the university student association Norrlands nation. The society aims to promote cultural activities from the historical provinces of Norrbotten and Västerbotten. Eligible for membership are male students at Uppsala University or SLU, who are born and/or having graduated from highschools in the aforementioned provinces. The device of the Birkarlarna is "Dåd, Mannakraft och Ära" (Deed, Manly Strength and Honour).

The activities of the Birkarlarna are centered on the stämma (a formal word for "meeting"). There are eight held annually, and they are named after the food served. The Stämmor are as follows;

- Älgstämman (Elk-Meeting)
- Paltstämman
- Blötastämman (Blöta is a kind of flatbread traditionally served at Christmas with ham and mustard)
- Rödingstämman (Arctic Char-meeting)
- Pyttstämman
- Märgbensstämman (Marrowbone-meeting. Food consist from reindeer's marrowbones)
- Sommarstämman (Summer-meet. Held in Norr- or Västerbotten)
- Surströmmingsstämman (Fermented herring is served)
