= Göteborgs nation =

Göteborgs nation may refer to one of the two following Swedish student nations:

- Göteborgs Nation, Lund
- Göteborgs nation, Uppsala
