= Anna Petrus =

Swedish sculptor, graphic artist, designer and dancer

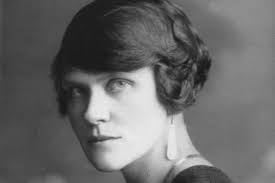
Anna Petrus

Anna Marie-Louise Petrus Lyttkens née Petersson (1886–1949) was a Swedish sculptor, graphic artist, designer and dancer. She is remembered in particular for the pewter and cast iron works with the lion motif she designed in the mid-1920s for Svenskt Tenn, some of which are still produced today. Petrus also contributed to the design of the Swedish pavilion for the 1925 Paris Exhibition.

== Biography ==
Born on 2 June 1886 in Uppsala, Anna Marie-Louise Petersson was the daughter of Oskar Viktor Petersson (1844–1912), an academic specializing in paediatrics, and the Countess Maria Strackelberg (1848–1897). In 1910, she changed her name to Petrus. Thanks to an inheritance, she was able to travel to London to study sculpture. On returning to Stockholm, she studied at the private art college Althins Målarskola which prepared her entry to the Royal Institute of Art in 1913.

Her daughter Sonja Lyttkens was born in 1919; Sonja Lyttkens became a notable Swedish mathematician.

In 1920, Petrus was planning a solo exhibition at the French Art Gallery in Stockholm but most of her works were destroyed in a fire in her studio with the result only a few could be presented. After taking a long trip to Italy, North Africa and Paris, on returning to her studio she decided to turn from painting to crafts. She designed candlesticks, inkwells, trays and tables, some in collaboration with the silversmith Karl Wojtech (1881–1944). Unusual for a woman, she drew on new techniques using copper, brass and pewter. Petrus created a number of decorative castings for Näfveqvarns Bruk which were displayed at the 1925 Paris Exhibition. They included columns and door-frame decorations for the Swedish pavilion, commissioned by the architect Carl Bergsten. After meeting Estrid Ericson, the founder of Svenskt Tenn, in the mid-1920s, from 1926 Petrus designed a variety of pewter and cast iron works, some of which are still produced today.

Petrus withdrew from creative artwork in 1930. She died in Kalmar on 26 July 1949.
