= Sonja Lyttkens =

Swedish mathematician

Sonja Lyttkens (26 August 1919 – 18 December 2014) was a Swedish mathematician, the third woman to earn a mathematics doctorate in Sweden and the first of these women to obtain a permanent university position in mathematics. She is also known for her work to make academia less hostile to women, and for pointing out that the Swedish taxation system of the time, which provided an income deduction for husbands of non-working wives, pressured women even in low-income families not to work. Her observations helped push Sweden into taxing married people separately from their spouses.

== Education and career ==
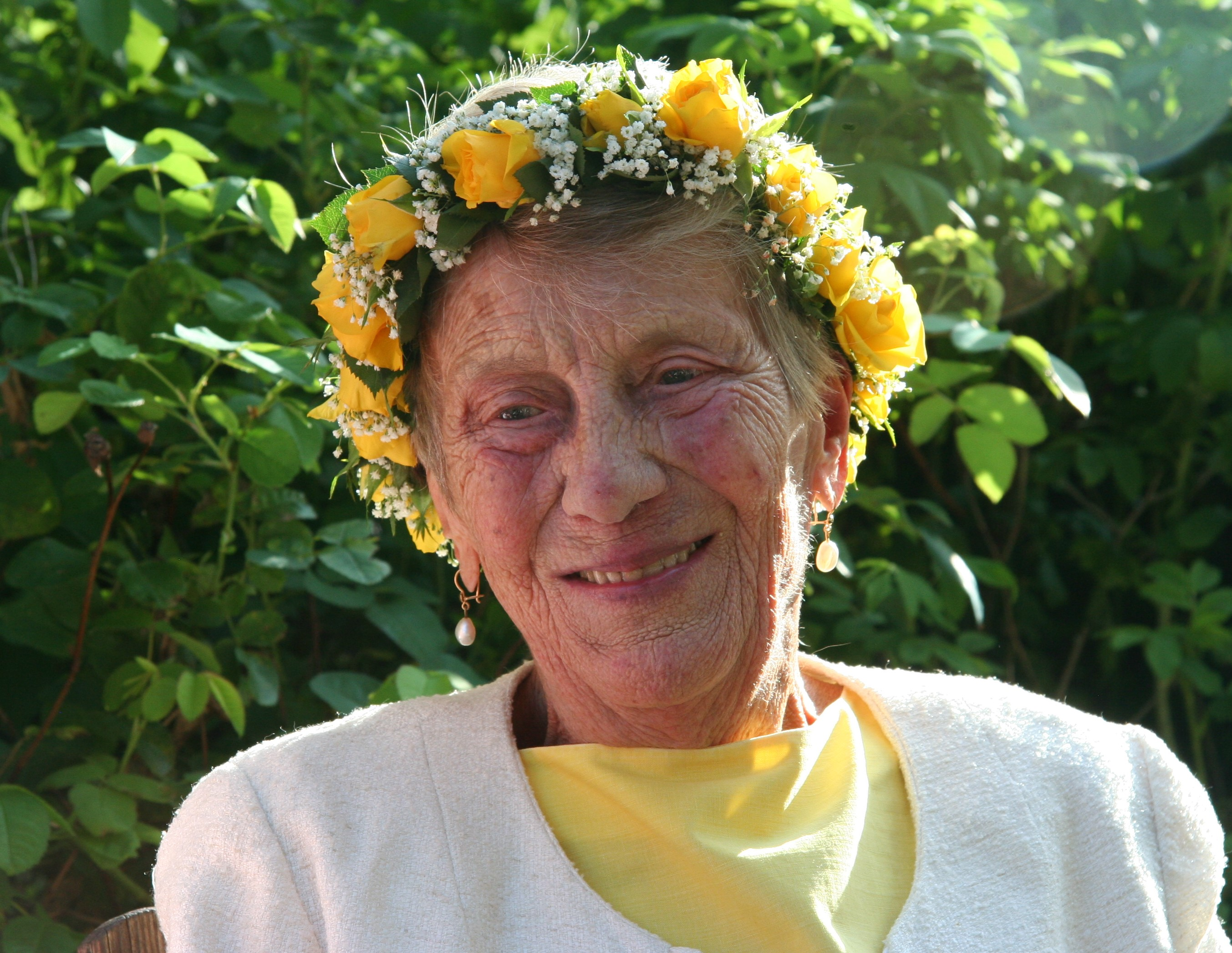
Sonja Lyttkens

Lyttkens grew up in Halmstad and Karlskrona, and moved to Kalmar in 1930. She moved again to Uppsala in 1937 to study mathematics, but her studies were interrupted by marriage and children. She earned a licentiate in 1951, and completed her Ph.D. at Uppsala University in 1956. Her dissertation, The Remainder In Tauberian Theorems, concerned Tauberian theorems and was jointly supervised by Arne Beurling and Lennart Carleson. She was the third woman to earn a doctorate in mathematics in Sweden, after Louise Petrén-Overton in 1911 and Ingrid Lindström in 1947.

Although Sofya Kovalevskaya had become a full professor of mathematics in a private university in Stockholm in 1884, women were forbidden from holding public university positions in Sweden until 1925, and both Petrén and Lindström became schoolteachers. Lyttkens obtained a permanent position as a senior lecturer at Uppsala University in 1963, and in 1970 she became the university's first female inspektor (an honorary chair of a student union), for the Kalmar nation. She retired in 1984.

== Personal life ==
Lyttkens was the daughter of Swedish sculptor Anna Petrus and her husband, physician Harald Lyttkens. Two of her children, Ulla Lyttkens and Harald Hamrell, both became film actors and directors.

As well as working in mathematics, Lyttkens also painted watercolors before and after her retirement, and had several exhibitions of her paintings.
