= Lars Burman =

Swedish literature academic (born 1958)

Lars Burman (born 1958) is a Swedish professor of Literature at Uppsala University, previous director of Uppsala University Library, and inspector at Värmlands nation.

He is married to the author Carina Burman.

== Bibliography ==
- (2015). Sju oroande perspektiv: Om biblioteksutvecklingen vid universitet och högskolor. Ingår i Lars-Gunnar Larsson (red.) Kungl. Vetenskapssamhällets i Uppsala årsbok 40/2013-2014, Uppsala: Kungl. Vetenskapssamhället i Uppsala. 53-69
- (2015). Skogekär Bergbo, Venerid, under redaktion av Lars Burman och med inledning av Horace Engdahl
- (2014). Med fjädern från en kerubs vinge: Studenten Erland Hofstens passionsepos "Ett Rimm" (1677). Textutgåva med inledning och förklaringar.
- (2013). Lärt gräl: Fredmans Sång N:o 28 och 1700-talets disputationskultur. Tidskrift för litteraturvetenskap, 5-15
- (2012). Eloquent Students: Rhetorical Practices at the Uppsala Student Nations 1663-2010. [Swedish translation 2013]
- (2008). Att förvalta sitt pund: om kulturarv och kulturarvsstrategier vid Uppsala universitet.
- (1998). Tre fruar och en mamsell: om C. J. L. Almqvists tidiga 1840-talsromaner
- (1990). Den svenska stormaktstidens sonett. Dissertation
