= Värmlands nation =

Student nation of Uppsala University

Coordinates: 59°51′26″N 17°38′02″E

Värmland's Nation
- Uppsala University
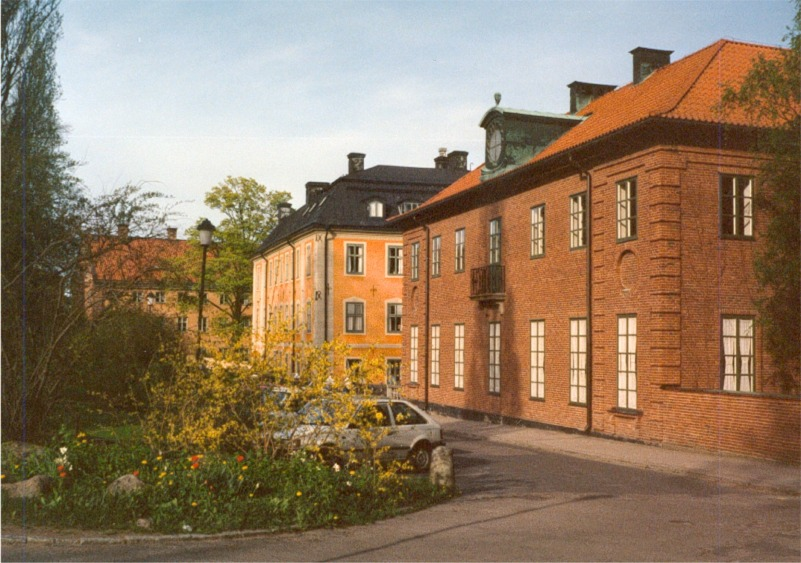
- Location: Ingmar Bergmansgatan 2; 753 10 Uppsala; Sweden
- Latin name: Natio Wermelandicae
- Abbreviation: N/A
- Established: 1660
- Inspektor: Lars Burman
- Membership: approx. 2800
- Website: www.varmlandsnation.se

Värmlands nation is one of the 13 student nations at Uppsala University. Värmlands nation catchment corresponds to Karlstad diocese, that is, the regions Värmland and Dalsland. No formal requirement related to any of these landscapes are nowadays a must. The nation has a wide range of activities, in addition to the nation's restaurant, café, pub and party activities the nation also has a library to borrow literature from. In addition, students also have the opportunities to apply for scholarships, and obtaining temporary loans from the nation. Other activities are: photography, sports, choir and theater. The nation building in red brick is designed by the architect Ragnar Östberg and was completed in the year 1930.

== History ==
Students from Värmland came together as early as in the late 1500s but first in 1660 formed an organized student community in that Värmland nation's constitution was written. The nation had their gatherings at the home of the inspector in the early years. As the number of members grew the organization had to find a home of their own. And so began a wandering life in various temporary facilities around the city of Uppsala until they finally got more permanent premises in the Oxenstiernska House, Uppsala.

== The nation house ==
In 1826 Erik Gustaf Geijer, then inspector, initiated the construction of a private nation house for the students from Värmland by starting a fund for this purpose. His idea was that the building would house the nation's book collections and make room for gatherings, "literary, musical and gymnastic exercises." It was in the 1870s that a permanent solution was at hand, and in 1874 Värmlands nation bought a plot in the city block S: t Erik of the nation, which is the same site as the nation house today is on.

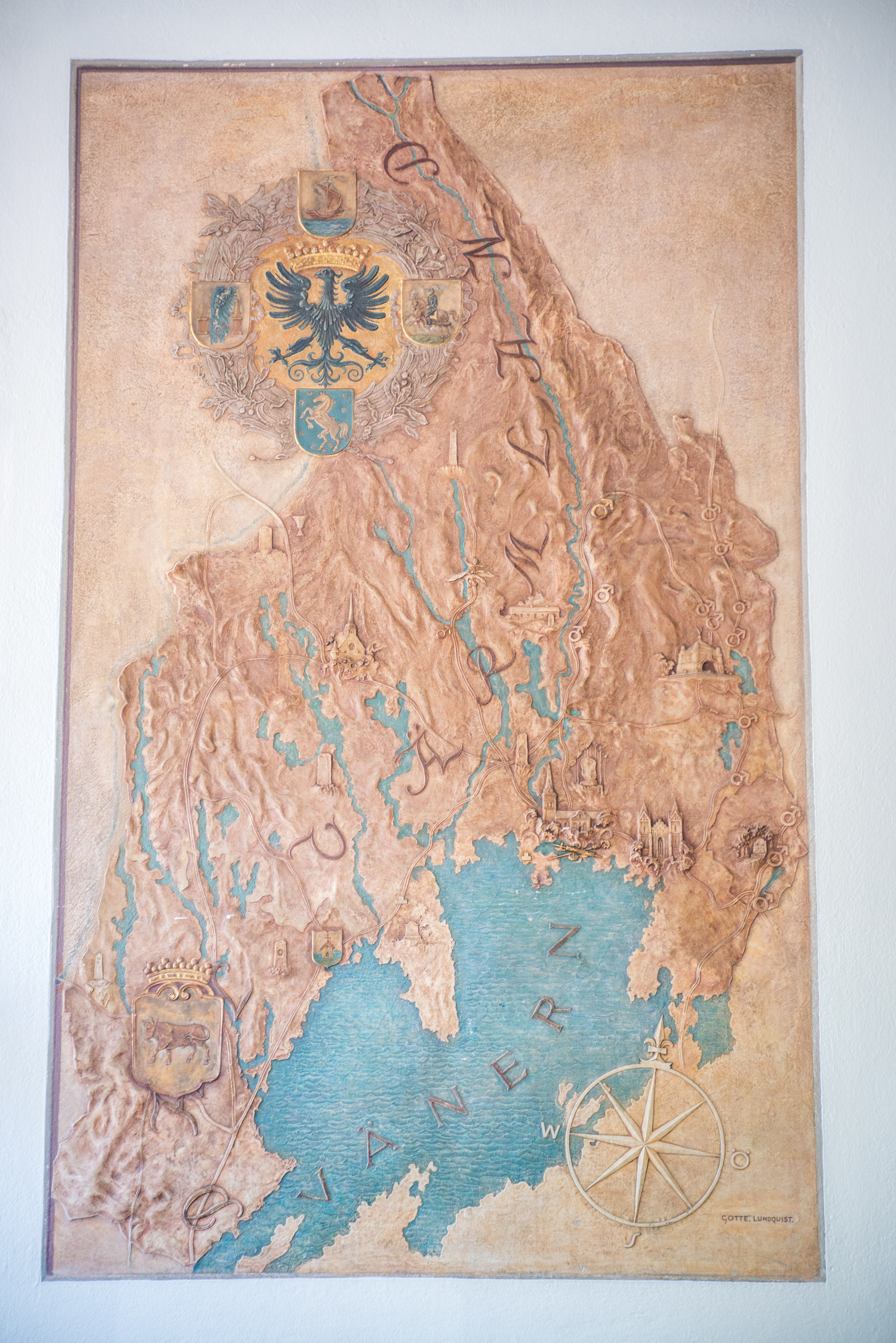
Relief made by Gotte Lundqvist

There are early sketches of a grand tennis court. The opportunity was given when the faithful Värmland's member Jonas Bjurzon in 1883 donated the considerable sum of 30,000 crowns to the "building of a Nation-house of stone". But all the plans did not become reality and it took some time before the house was finished. It was in the autumn of 1910 that the building issue came up again, through the nation's Första kurator Helge Kjellin. He asked his brother Elis Kjellin, who was an architect in Stockholm, if he could make a proposal to the nation on a building, to which he replied yes. The mission was not officially asked, so the nation did not take a position on the proposals Elis leaving out. But now at least, the discussion started and it happened so that even a request went to Eli's more famous colleague Ragnar Östberg. This took place in autumn 1912, and was asked by the nation's Första and Andra kurator, Arne West Branch, and Hugo Stenbeck. The reason to why Östberg had been asked was not so out of the blue, since he was considered the best architect of his generation. Östberg had created this reputation mainly through his many villa projects and private residences. He also expressed strong disapproval of 1800s architecture ideals and was therefore also seen as the spokesman for a new age and ideals of life.

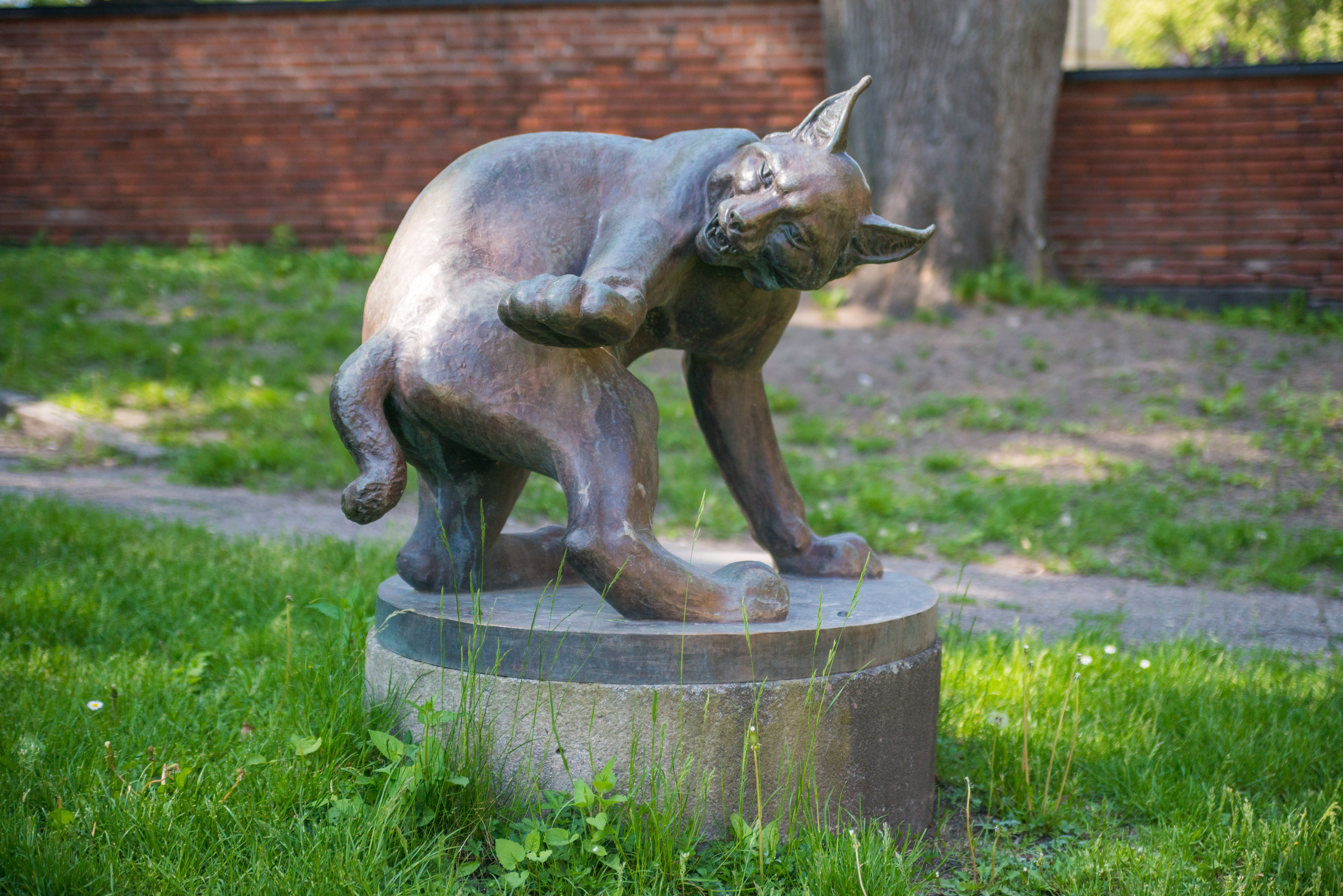
Sculpture made by the artist Arvid Knöppel

Ragnar Östberg submitted a proposal to the nation in May 1913. Already during the fall semester of the same year they decided to go ahead with the plans. Östberg could therefore continue with sketches, and drawings could be delivered in May 1914. The nation was now had all it needed for a building to be erected, property, funds and drawings from the architect. But then came the war, and prices rose sharply, which resulted in a decision taken by the nation in November to delay the start of construction. After this the plans fell several years into dormancy. It was not until the end of 1925 as the plans again came up for discussion. But now the nations found Östberg's previous drawings outdated, after which the nation asked the architect to process them. This did not come as a surprise to Östberg, who himself had been rethinking these plans for the new nation house after the Stockholm City Hall was completed in 1923. Östberg who did not have any other project at the time, had in 1924 found his old drawings of the nation and thought it was unfair that those had been forgotten because of the war years. Östberg could around 1925, together with the newly elected countryman Paul Mohn, ignite the nation's interest to implement a new building.

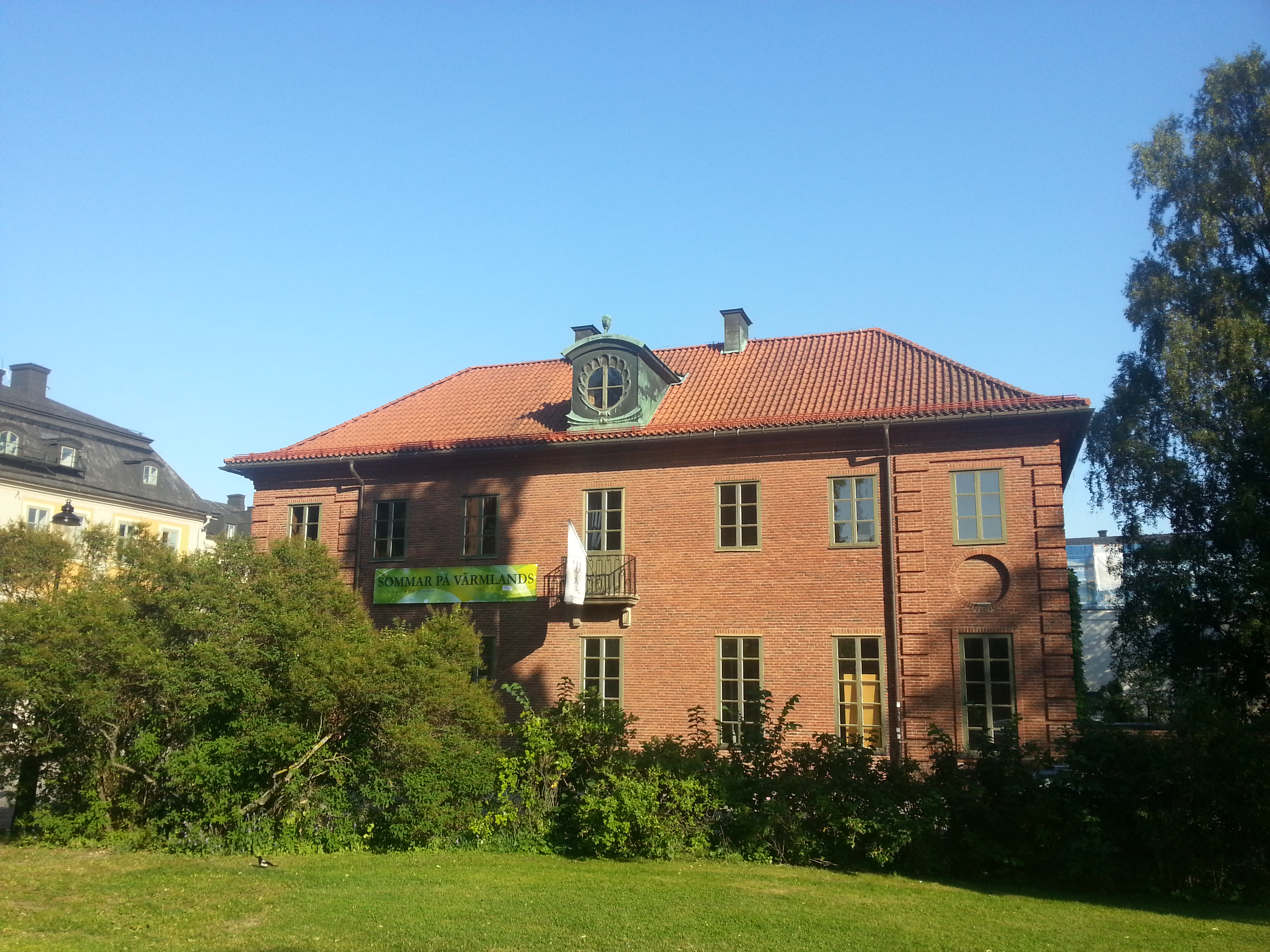
Värmlands nation 2014

In 1926 Östberg could once more present a proposal which was substantially similar to the house we see today. In the drawings, they could see that the hall with its large staircase became one of the main rooms. The entrance had a long, narrow cloakroom and where we can see a broad staircase, which showed that Östberg not lost his love for the procession-like roads into a building. The facades with the high ceiling and the simple pilasters make the thoughts go to the Dutch and Swedish 1600s. After seeing these new drawings made by Ragnar Östberg, the decision was taken May 14, 1926 to give a mandate to the architect. Master drawings from Östberg came in March 1927. It was not until spring 1929 that the actual construction work could take off. To oversee the construction work, the nation choose Anders Diös. The Building Committee was led by Harald Eklund, Förste kurator in 1926 and then became a professor of philosophy of religion. It was only at the end of the construction, when Ragnar Östberg realized what deed they did this neighborhood that previously consisted of ramschackled housing, the architect himself wrote "the great responsibility that the architect of this nation building has at the foot of the Swedish realm Cathedral and Holy Trinity Church."

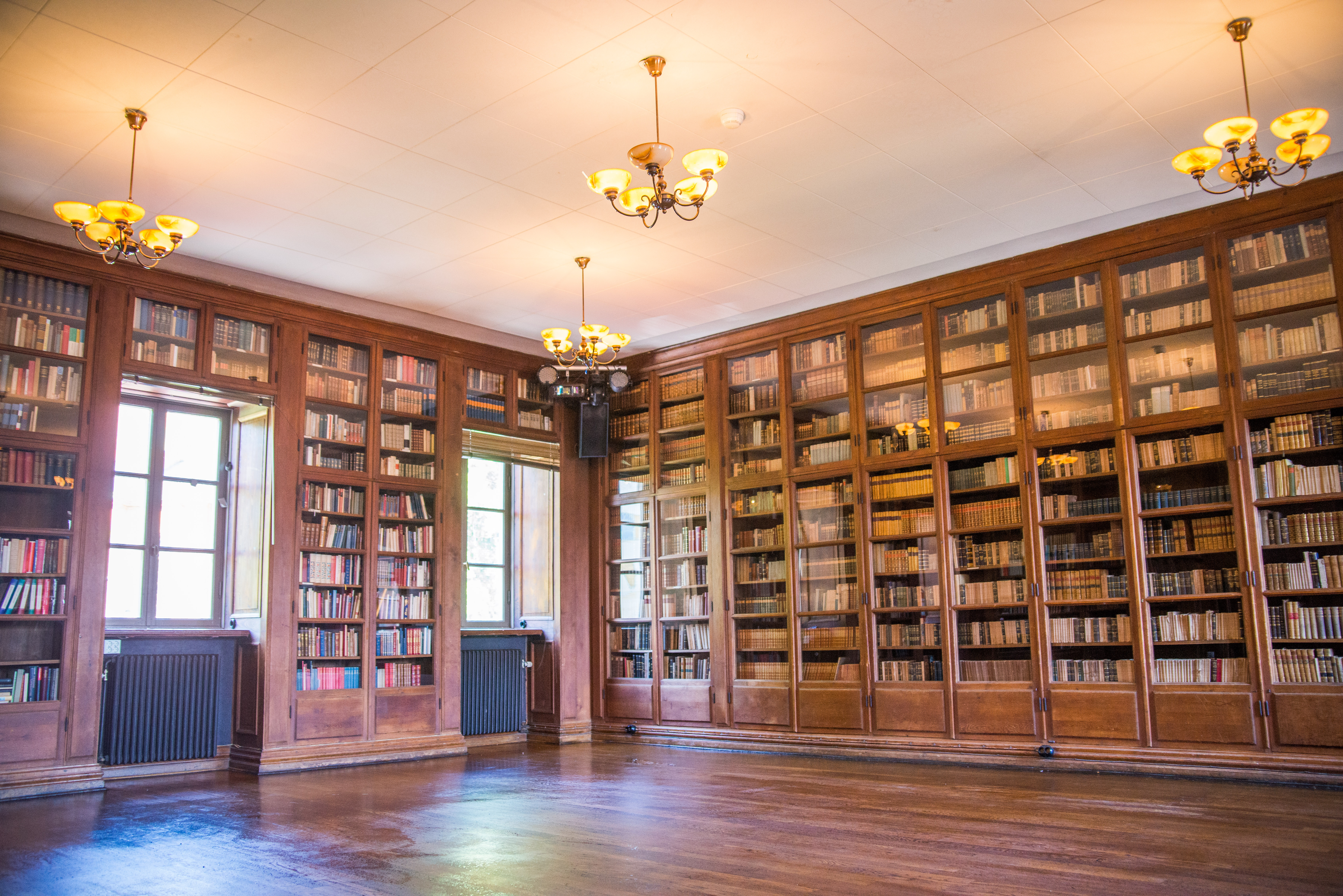
Värmlands nation's library

First, October 11, 1930 the King Gustav V, chosen as Principal Honorary 1877, inaugurated the new nations house at Riddartorget. Other celebrities who attended this day was Östen Undén, he was there as a representative of the University, the Church's presence consisted of Archbishop Nathan Söderblom, the home district was represented by the governor of Värmland Abraham Unger and Bishop Eklund. Östberg wanted the new house to interact with the environment around Riddartorget and therefore chose brick to mimic the cathedral facade.

The new nation house reflected the social role that a nation had at this time, and even those who could not attend the opening ceremony wanted to show their appreciation that the Värmland's student nation got a new house. Selma Lagerlöf, for example, sent a telegram which read as follows:

Good luck with the new house
never anything wrong with the light
never empty boiler
may its flame genius
low so the toil that mirth
cardiac heat hold together
The shrine of the Värmlands children.

Before the 350-year anniversary in 2010, parts of nation building's interior and its guest entrance was renovated from May to September 2009. Among other things, an elevator was installed in the house, which goes all the way from the ground floor to the attic space, the premises were handicap adapted and several new flooring was laid

== Housing ==
The nation house was completed in 1930, and it was now not long before the nation felt ready to build again. In 1935 the question was raised whether it was time to build student housing for the nation's behalf. It was common in other European cities to build student housing, but in Sweden this had not yet been common in a more major scale. The donation that the nation had received in 1901 by psychiatry professor Nils Gustaf Kjellberg of Sweden's first clinical teacher in psychiatry, could now be used for this purpose. In May 1935, research was made in order to investigate if the nation could build student housing, and in the fall semester 1936, the house was ready for moving in. It consisted of 32 student rooms. The building was named Fyllebo (today Phyllebo), meaning (Drunken House), and it has even been called Ekeby, and the Cavaliers' wing, never on paper though. The reason it was named Fyllebo was that in the building's proximity there was a Christian sober living house with the name Nykterbo (Sober House). This building, Fyllebo, was the second building in Uppsala intended for students, the first was the Student Union house on the Öfre Slottsgatan. This building was the first student housing built by a nation. With this construction the nation was the owner of five buildings in Uppsala. This included the Oxenstierna House, where many compatriots ate in Lindholm's dining rooms, Söderbomska house, where Professor Runestam lived, and City hotel, where they used to eat the scenery, held senior council and building meetings.

Phyllebo and Dygdebo is located on Torsgatan and Götgatan in Uppsala. Phyllebo consists of dorm corridors. Dygdebo consists of nine apartments available in the residence halls. Since autumn 2008, the nation has also owns 50 apartments in Ekonomikum park in a house called Rackarbo.

== Wermlandus ==
It was during the first landskap in 1960 that it was determined that Värmlands nation would have its very own newspaper. It was the former 1Q, Carl-Wedig Geijer, who initiated it, and it something that was done in connection with the nation's 300th anniversary. The newspaper would be published four times a year, and then before each declared landskap. At first it was a little unclear what the magazine would be called, and it has had some different names. The first issue was called simply the "Nationsbladet", but the editorial starr quickly thought it was somewhat unoriginal and the name was later changed to "Pst!" for the second number. But after the second issue several readers said that this was difficult to pronounced and awkward to say. It was only the third time lucky as the name was nailed, so at the third issue had been named "Wermlandus", which is the name it still has today. On the first page of the first issue, one could read: "The purpose of the same is to try to achieve a facilitator, where counselors and other officials in a perhaps more convenient and nicer way than before can communicate with the country men. In the past, the landscape callings, semester programs, scholarship announcements, etc. has been sent by mail or announced on the bulletin boards of the nation, but this has proven both costly and impractical, which is why this leaflet may be regarded as a rationalization effort."

The name of the magazine comes from the classic name of a student from Varmland and Dalsland, but it also stands for the Latin word for Värmland.

Wermlandus is the only thing Värmland's nation send out to their members, and the newspaper has two recurring elements - the nation's landskap vocation and a 1Q segment. The magazine is sent out to members, seniors and honorary members.

== Art at the nation ==
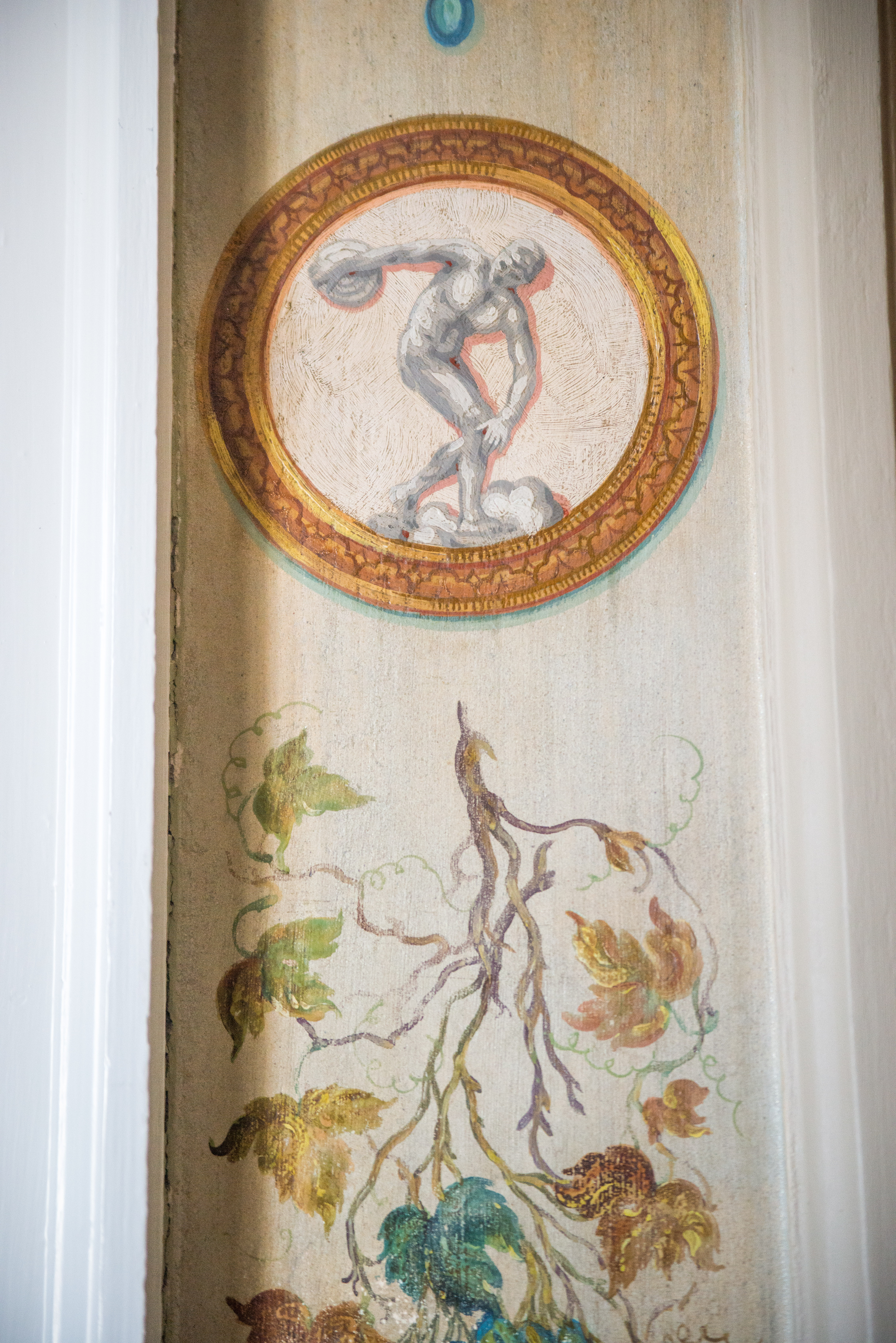
Detail from the Tegnér room murals. Copy after atrium from Tegnér's home, the Rämmen's mansion. Made by Gotte Lundqvist, and given to the nation by the inspector Arne Fredga.

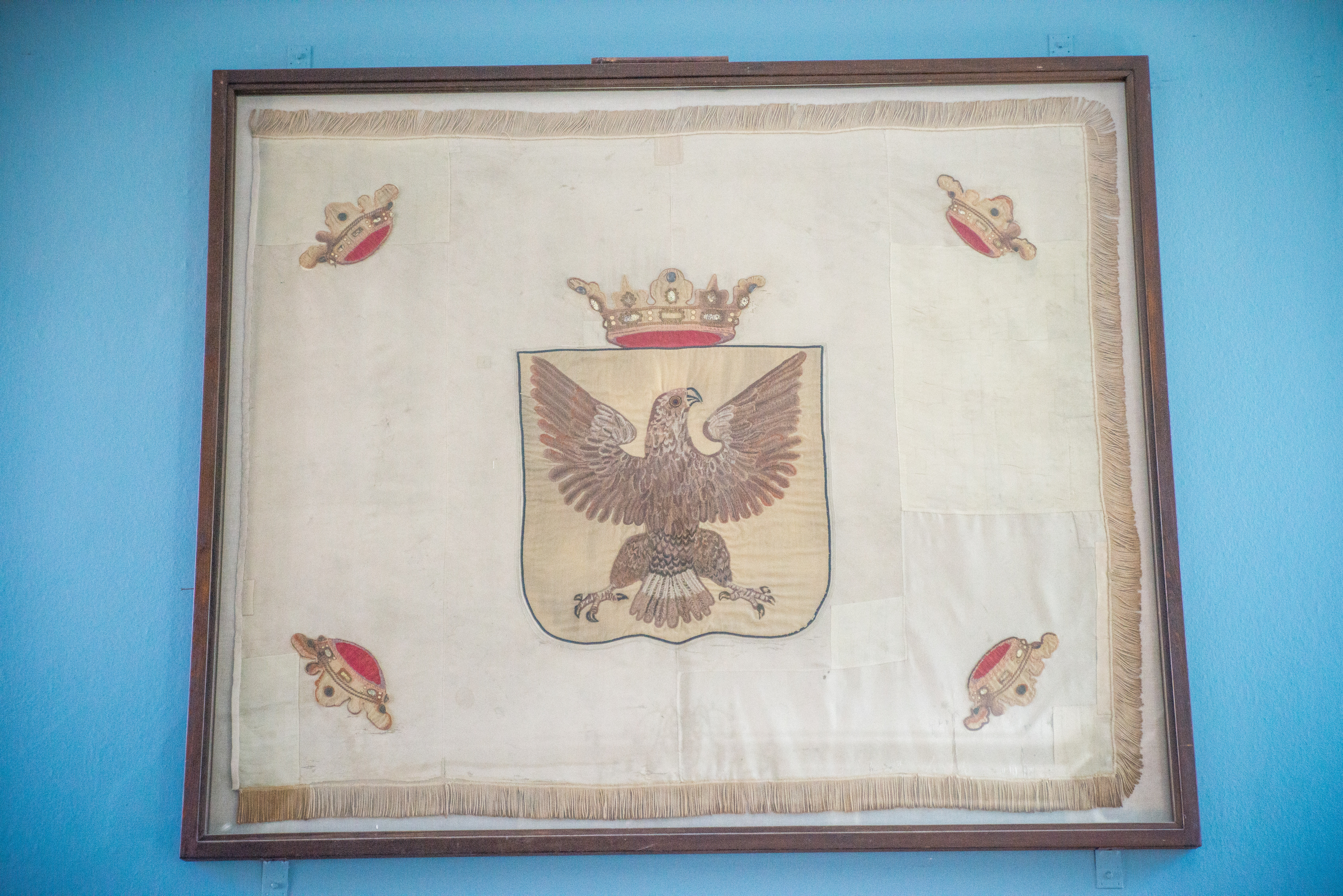
Banner in the nation's great hall.

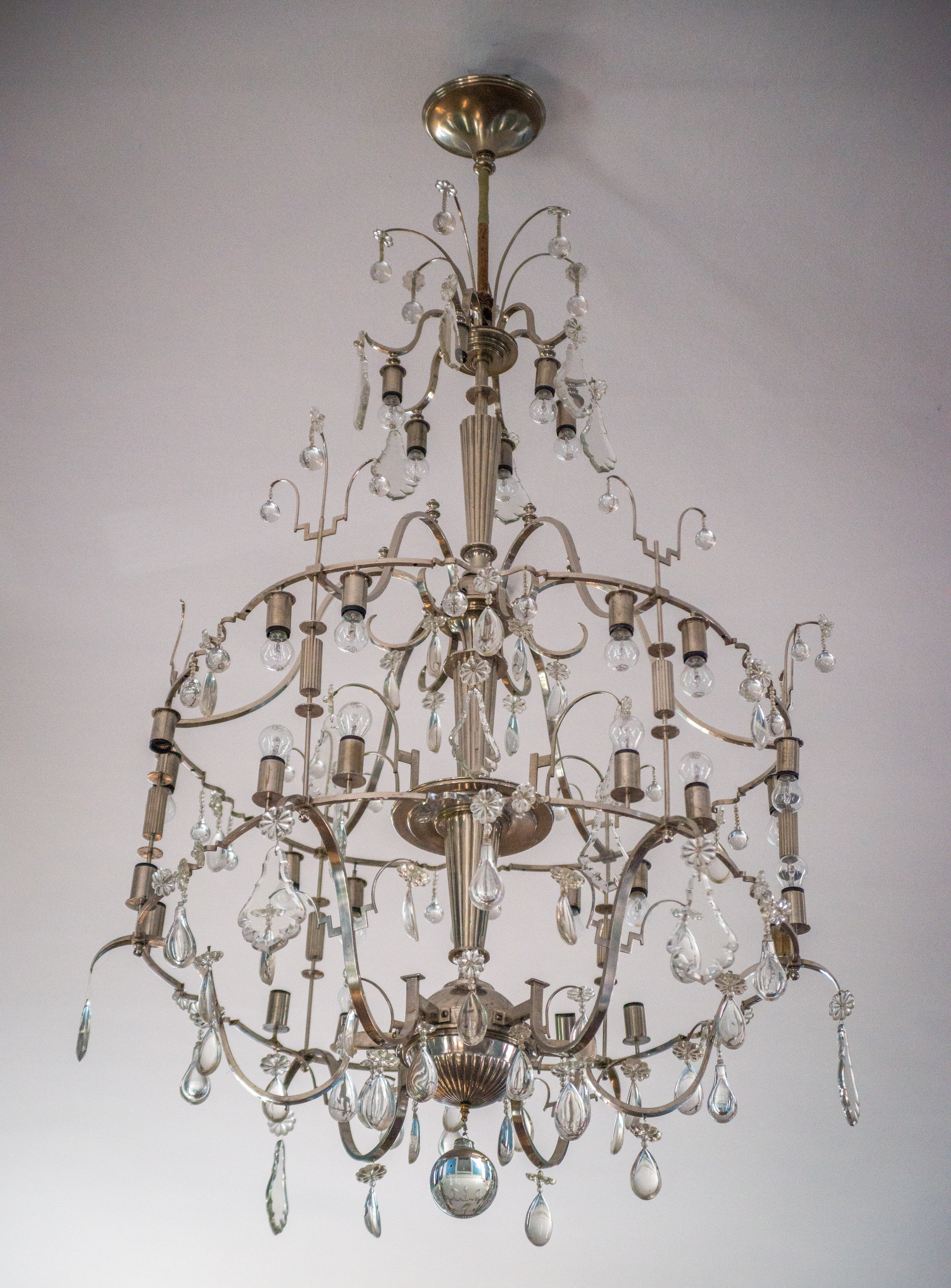
Crystal chandelier designed by Ragnar Östberg for the nation house. Hanging in the nation's great hall.

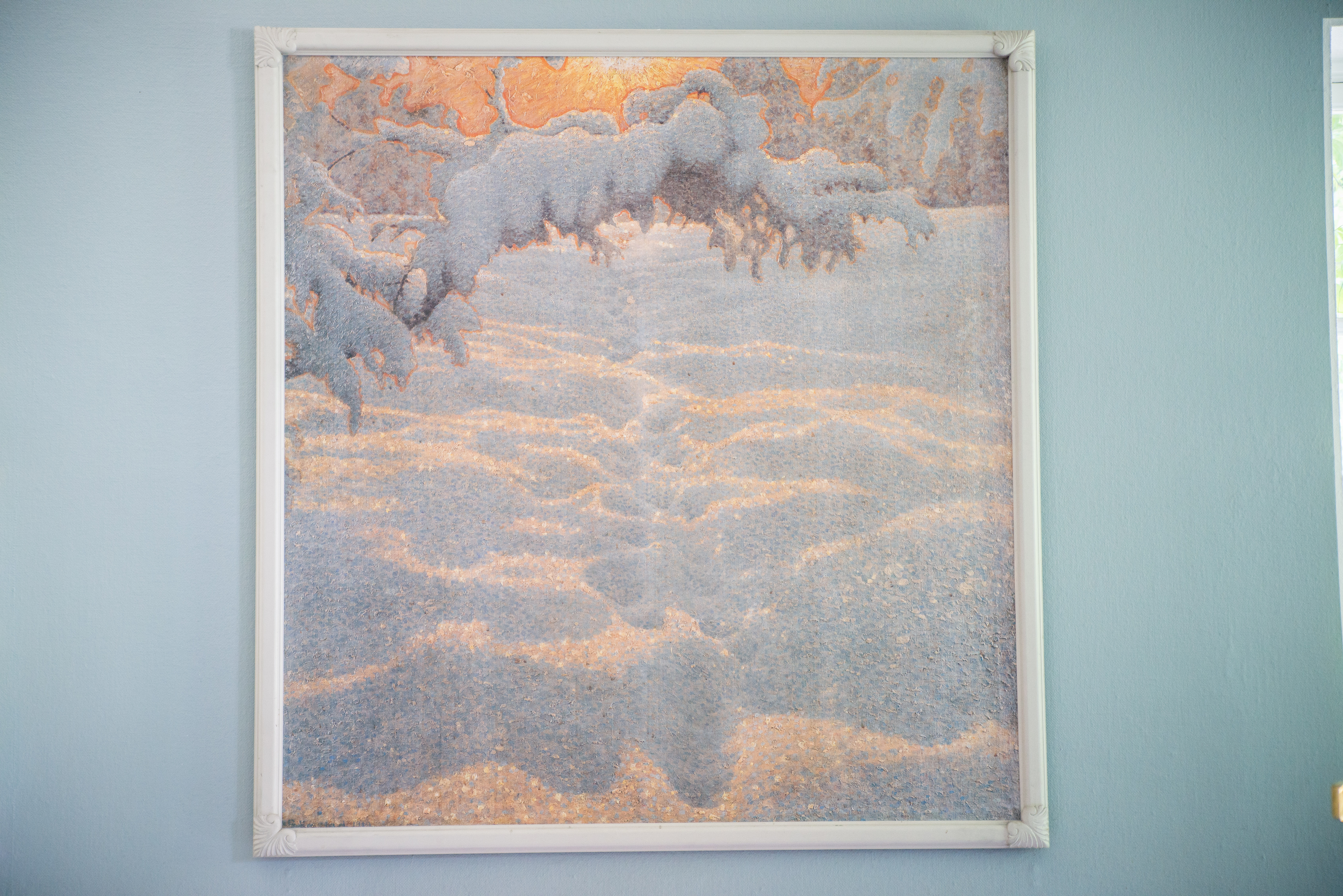
"Life's Mystery" painted by Gustaf Fjæstad, purchased in 1924 in connection with the Fjaestad exhibition at the nation. Copy, the original is deposited by the nation at Rackstadmuseet in Arvika.

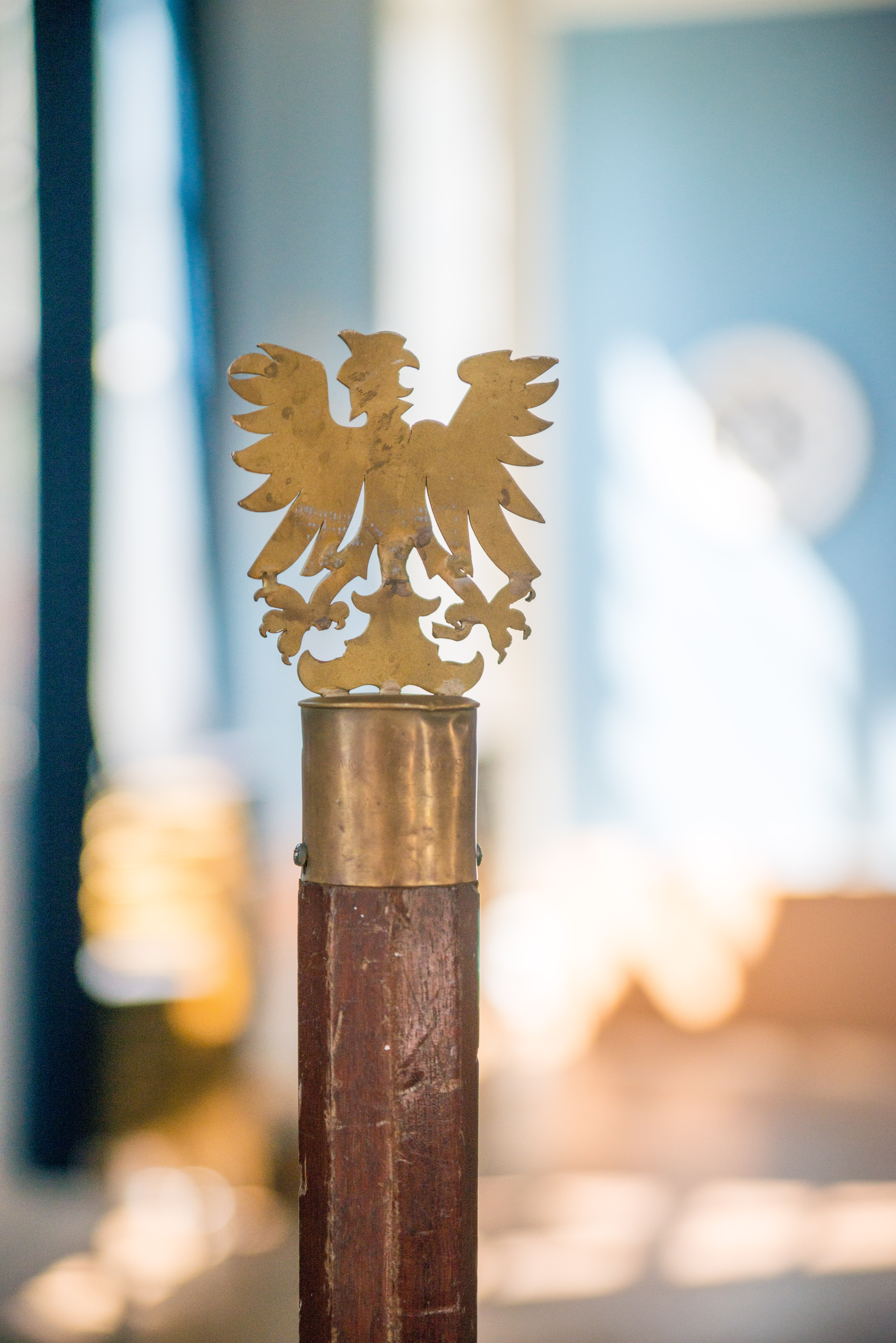
Detail of Tredje kurators staff that is crowned by a two-dimensional eagle. Gift to the nation from Wermländska Sällskapet.

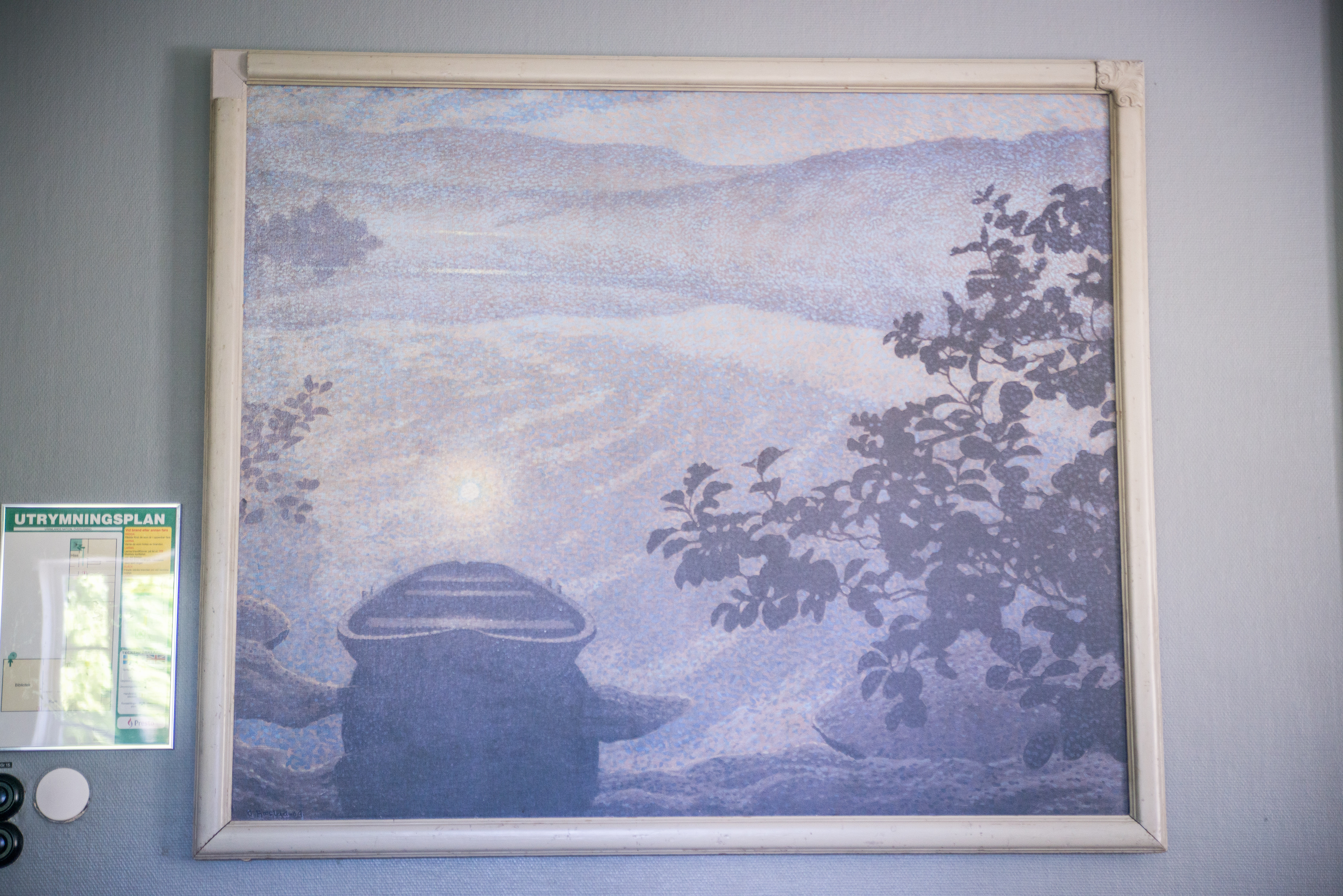
"Moonlight clinker" painted by Gustaf Fjeastad 1909. A copy, the original is deposited of the nation at Rackstadmuseet in Arvika. Gift to the Nation by the artist in 1929 "with thanks for the song on the Wärmlandska exhibition 29".

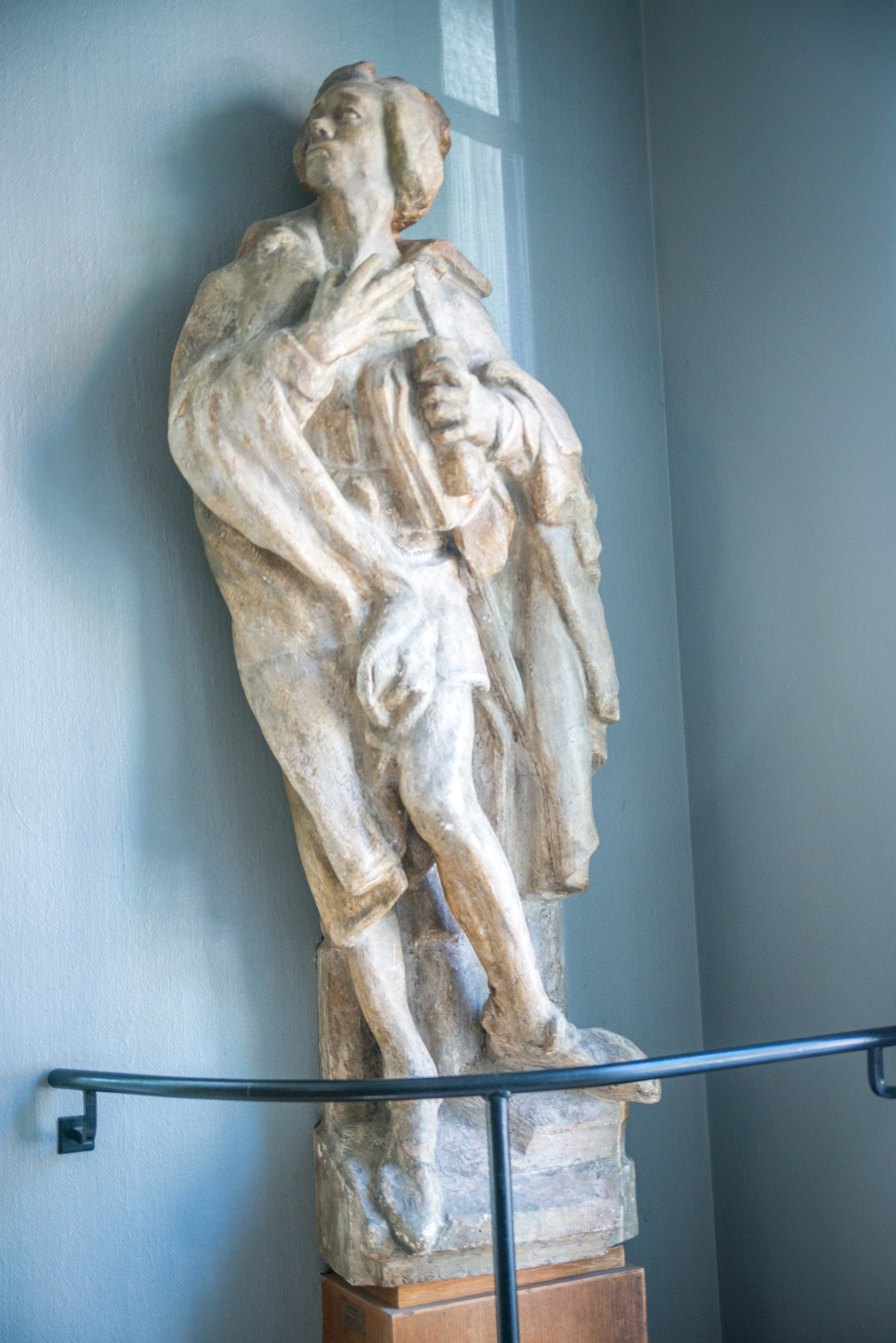
"The student" in the nation's parade staircase.

== Leadership (Kuratelet) ==
The nation is led by the so-called Kuratel, comprising 1Q (Förste kurator), 2Q (Andre kurator) and 3Q (Tredje kurator). First curator (1Q) is responsible for the overall organization. He/she makes sure that members are properly registered, makes sure that the business is going well and that the nation's regulatory is maintained. 1Q is also the nation's spokesperson and head outside the "normal" world, including official contact. Andre kurator (2Q) is financially responsible to the nation. 2Q is responsible for the nation's treasury, paying bills, paying salaries, fixes taxes, manages the nation lending and let people know if they spend too much of the nation's money. Tredje kurator (3Q) is practically responsible for all the activities at the nation. 3Q is the one who makes sure that there is always someone who takes care of all the tasks that need to be implemented and that the nation's various events advertised. 3Q is personnel manager, leads the jobs and educates ämbetsmän involved in the daily operations.

== Honorary members ==
Below is a selection of some of the nation's honorary members, both present and past.

- Gustaf V, king of Sweden 1907-1950
- Prince Carl Philip, duke of Värmland
- Lars Burman, author, professor, director of Uppsala University Library
- Karin Söder, former Foreign Minister

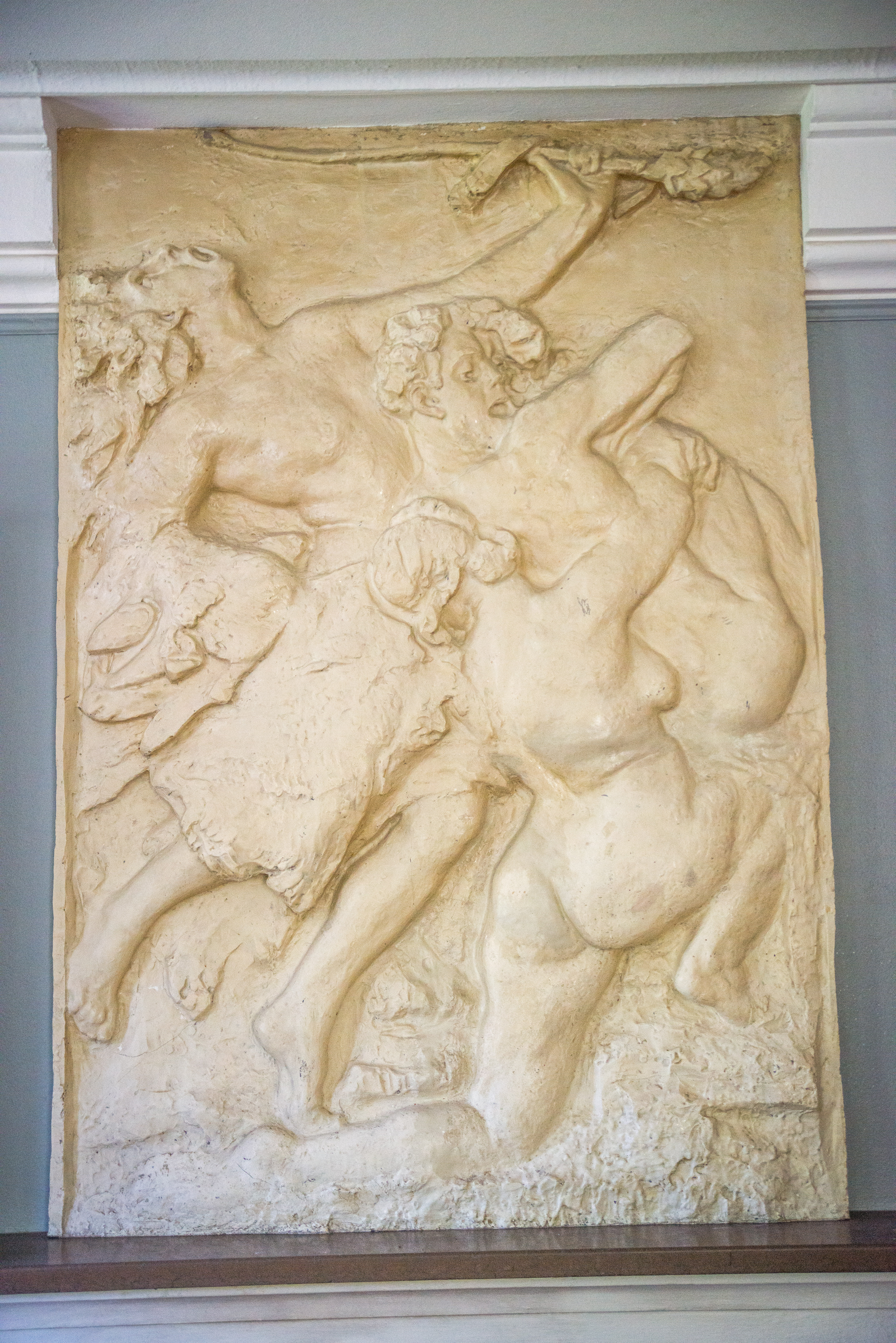
"Dancing bacchants" made by the artist Christian Eriksson. Made in plaster, and is a draft for the frieze at the Dramatic Theatre in Stockholm. Gift to the Nation from the artist in 1909.

- Inger Sandberg, author
- Lars Löfgren, author

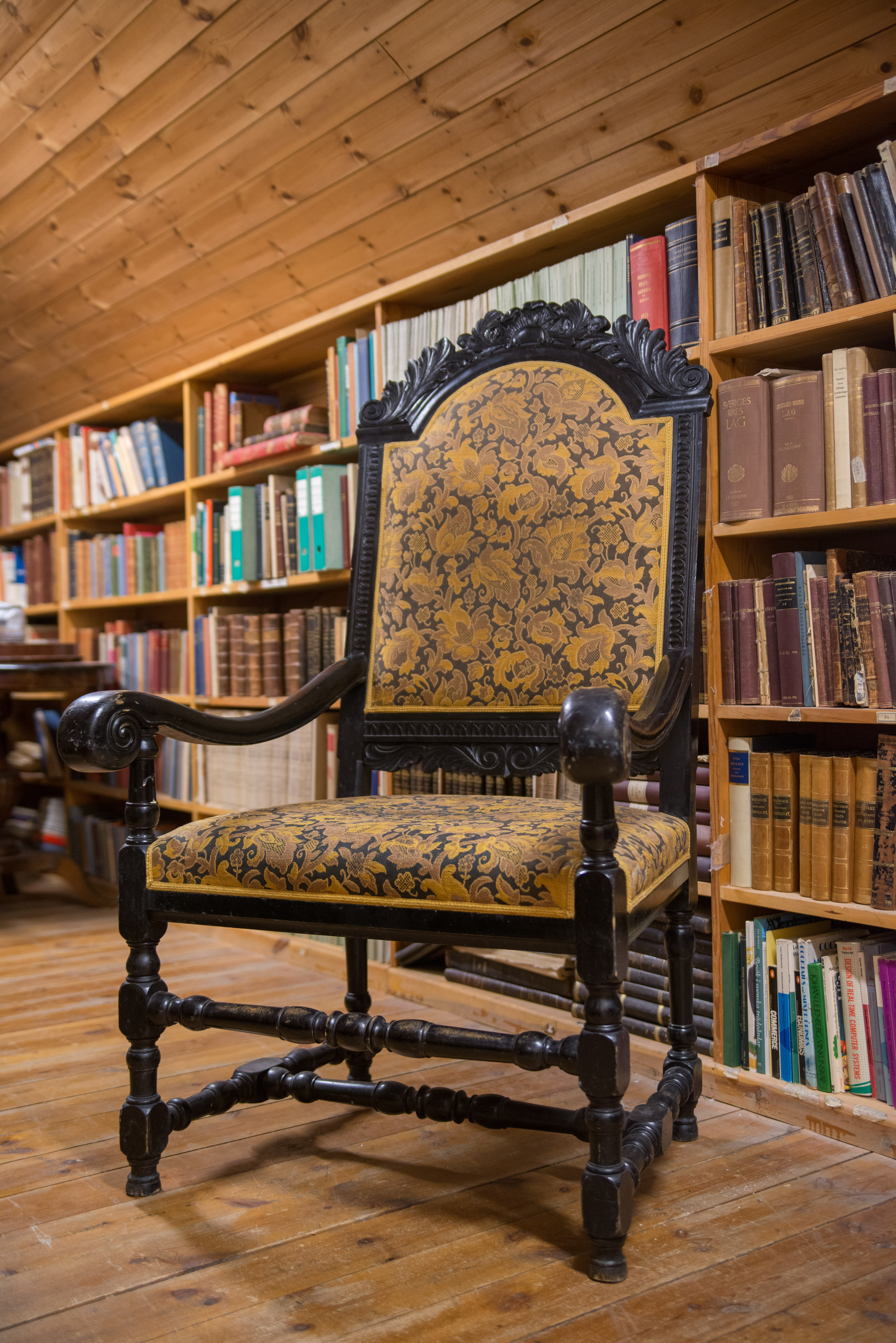
Inspector chair. Copy after Tegnérs armchair from Rämmen's mansion. Gift to the nation from Wermländska Sällskapet.

- Selma Lagerlöf, författare, nationens förste kvinnliga hedersledamot
- Ingemar Eliasson, former governor of Värmland
- Håkan Hagegård, court singer
- Sven-Erik Magnusson, musician
- Solveig Ternström, actor
- Bengt Berg, poet
- Eva Eriksson, former governor
- Bengt Olson, artist
- Helga Görlin, court singer
- Rolf Ekéus, former ambassador
- Jan von Bonsdorff, professor art history
- Lars Lerin, artist
- Bengt Alsterlind, journalist, TV-profile
- Gunilla Gren-Eklund, indologist
- Nils Hasselmo, former principal of University of Minnesota
- Pontus Wikner, philosopher
- Tage Erlander, politician
- Nils Gunnar Billinger, political officer

== Inspectors ==
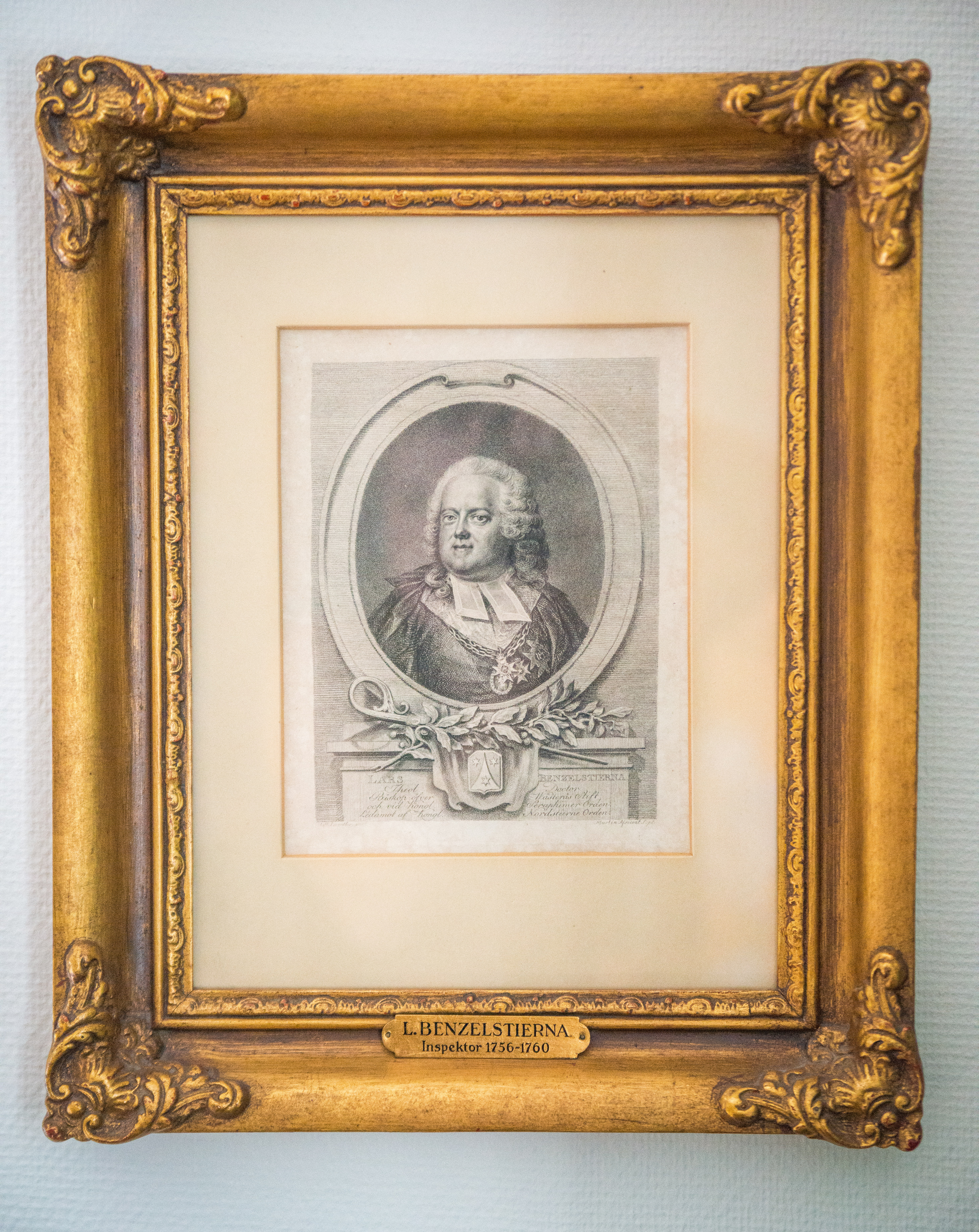
Lars Benzelstjerna, inspector 1756–1760

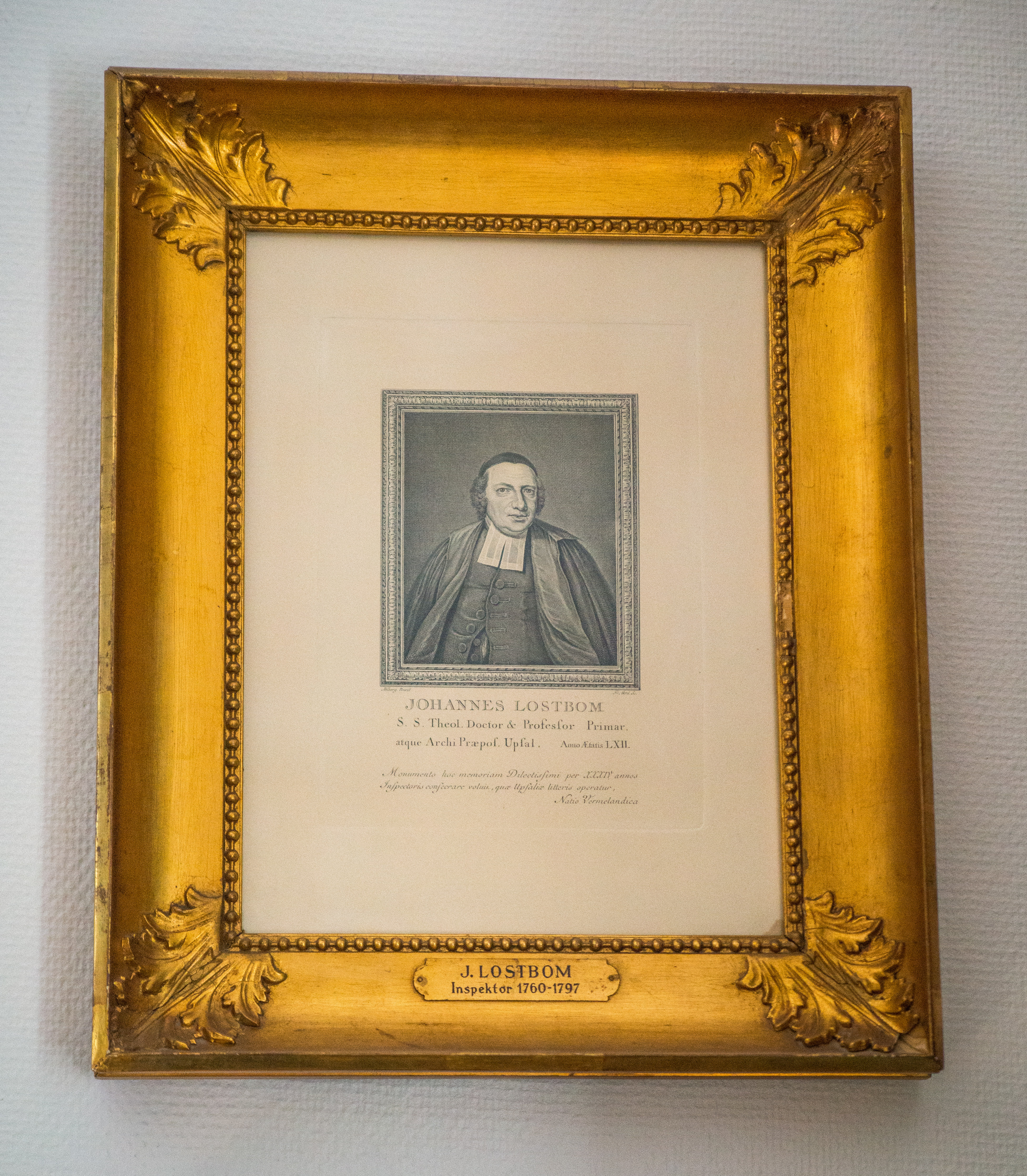
Johan Lostbom, inspector 1760–1797

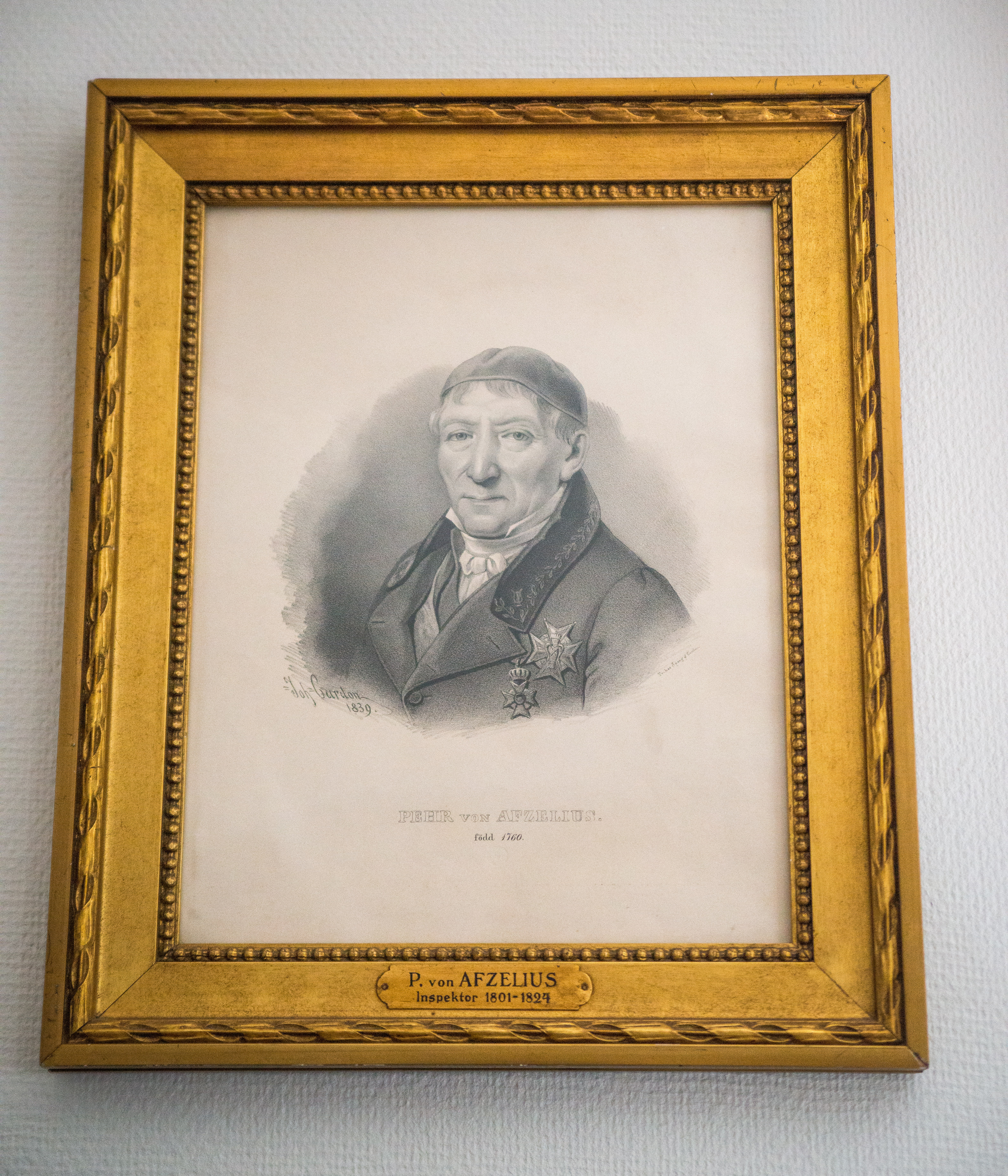
Per von Afzelius, inspector 1801–1824

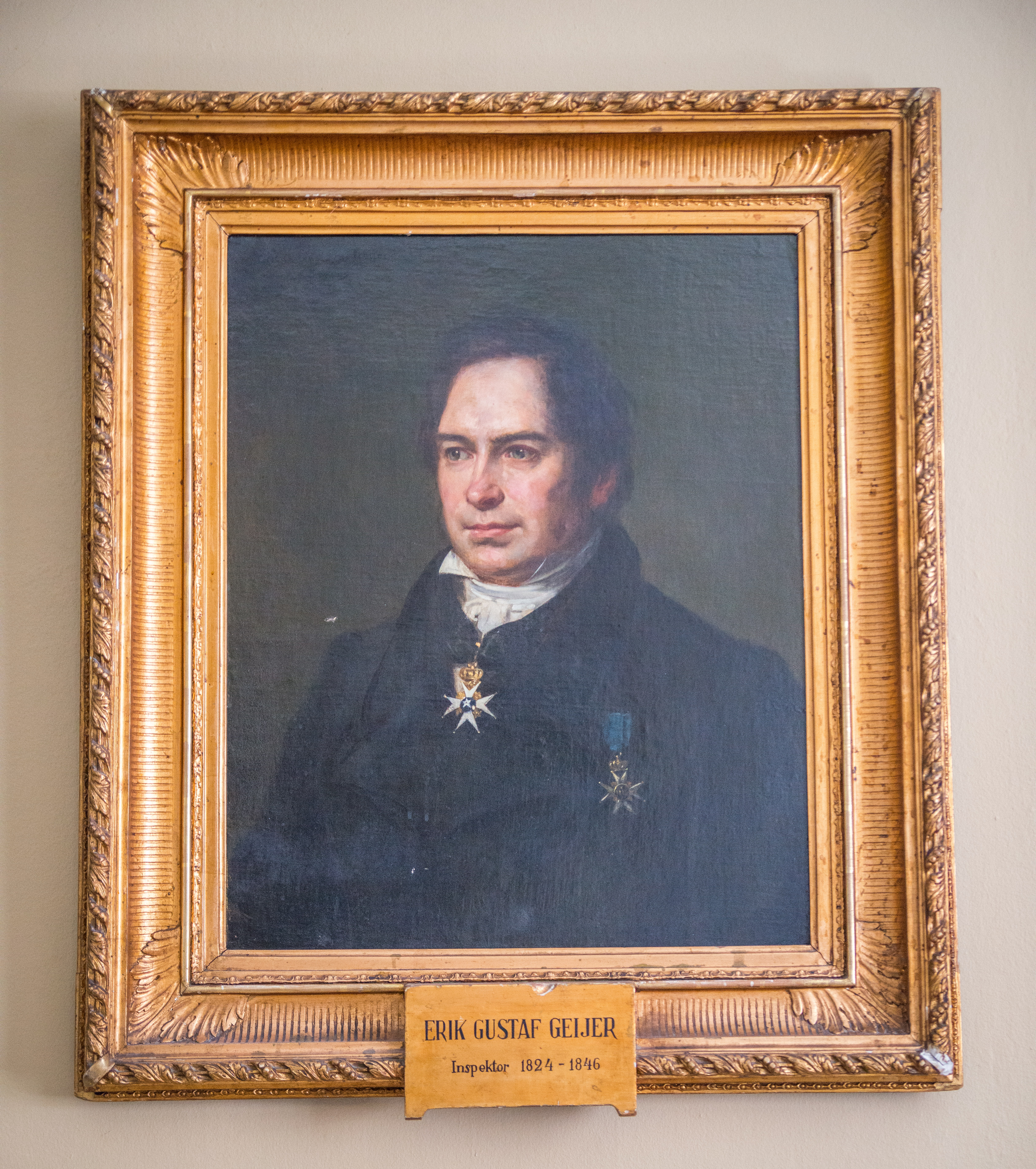
Erik Gustaf Geijer, inspector 1824–1846

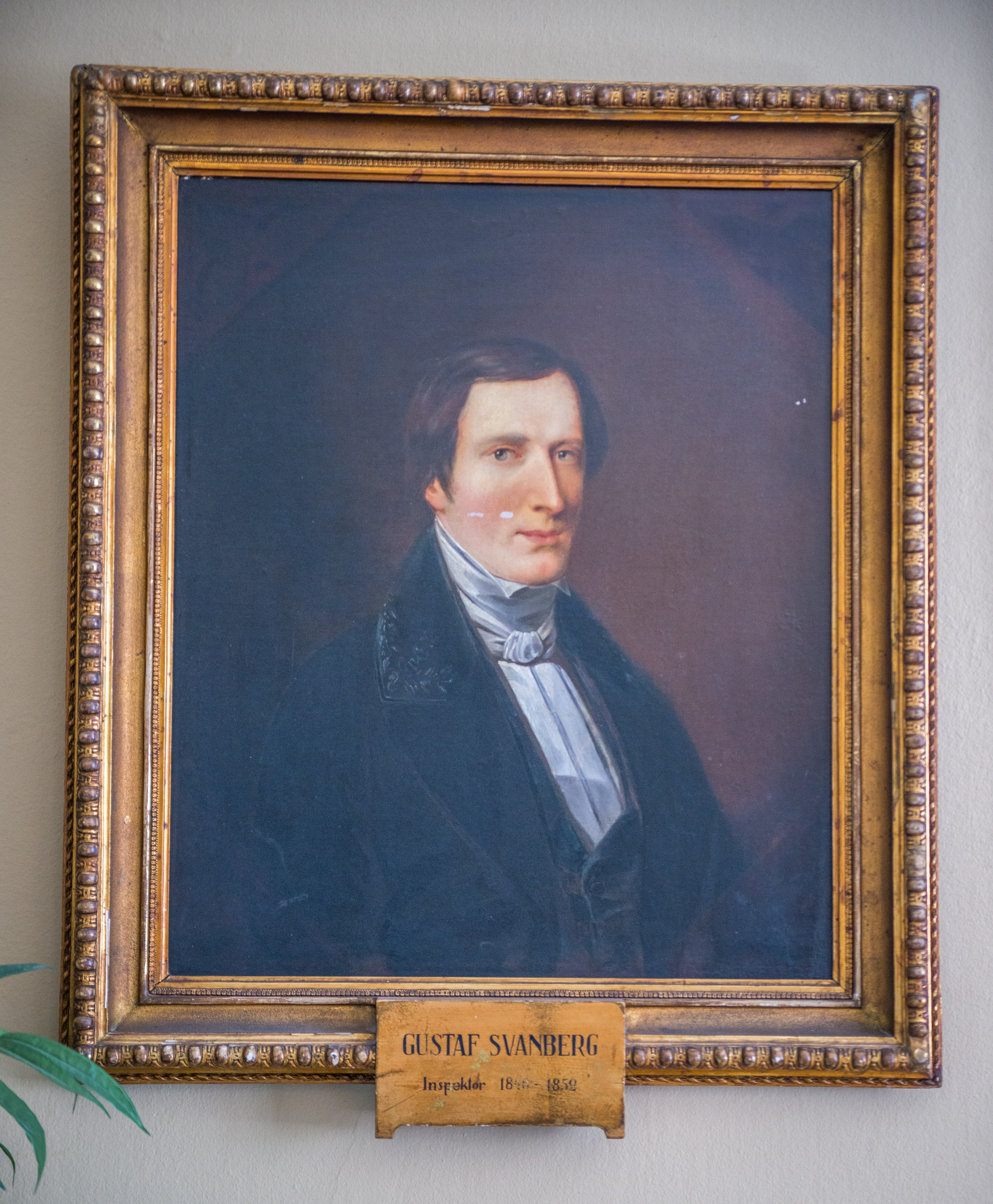
Gustaf Svanberg, inspector 1846–1852

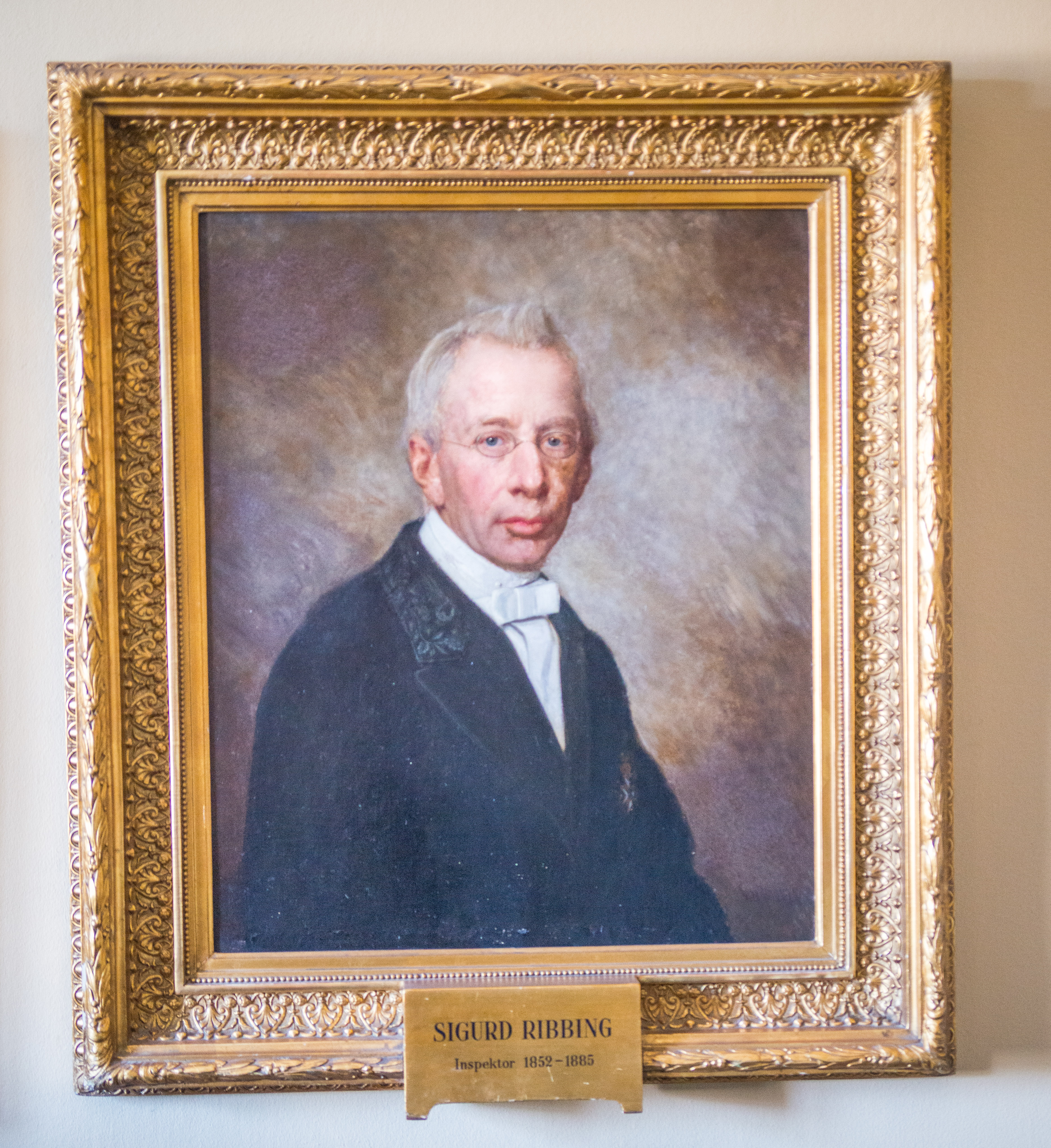
Sigurd Ribbing, inspector 1852–1885

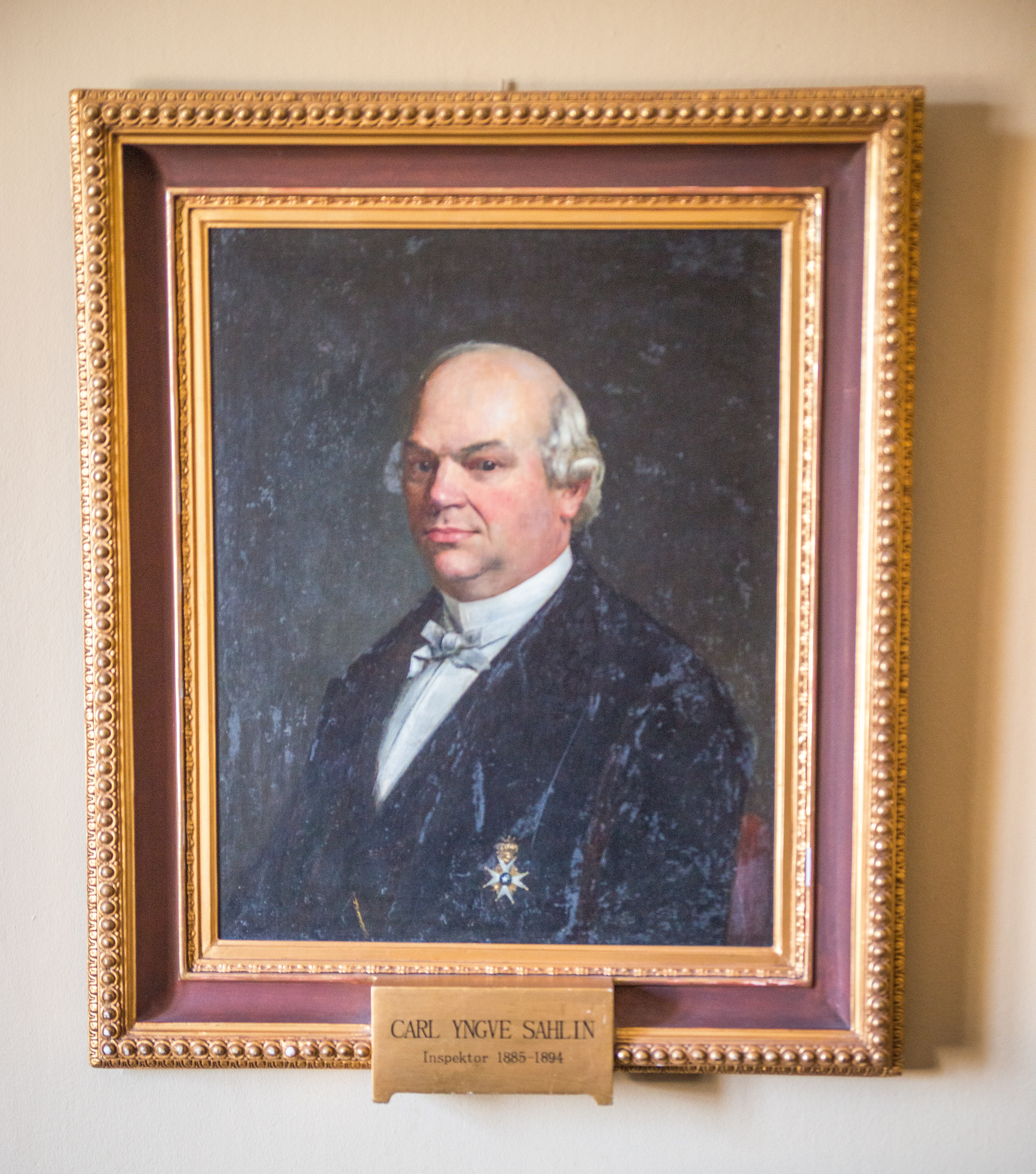
Carl Yngve Sahlin, inspector 1885–1894

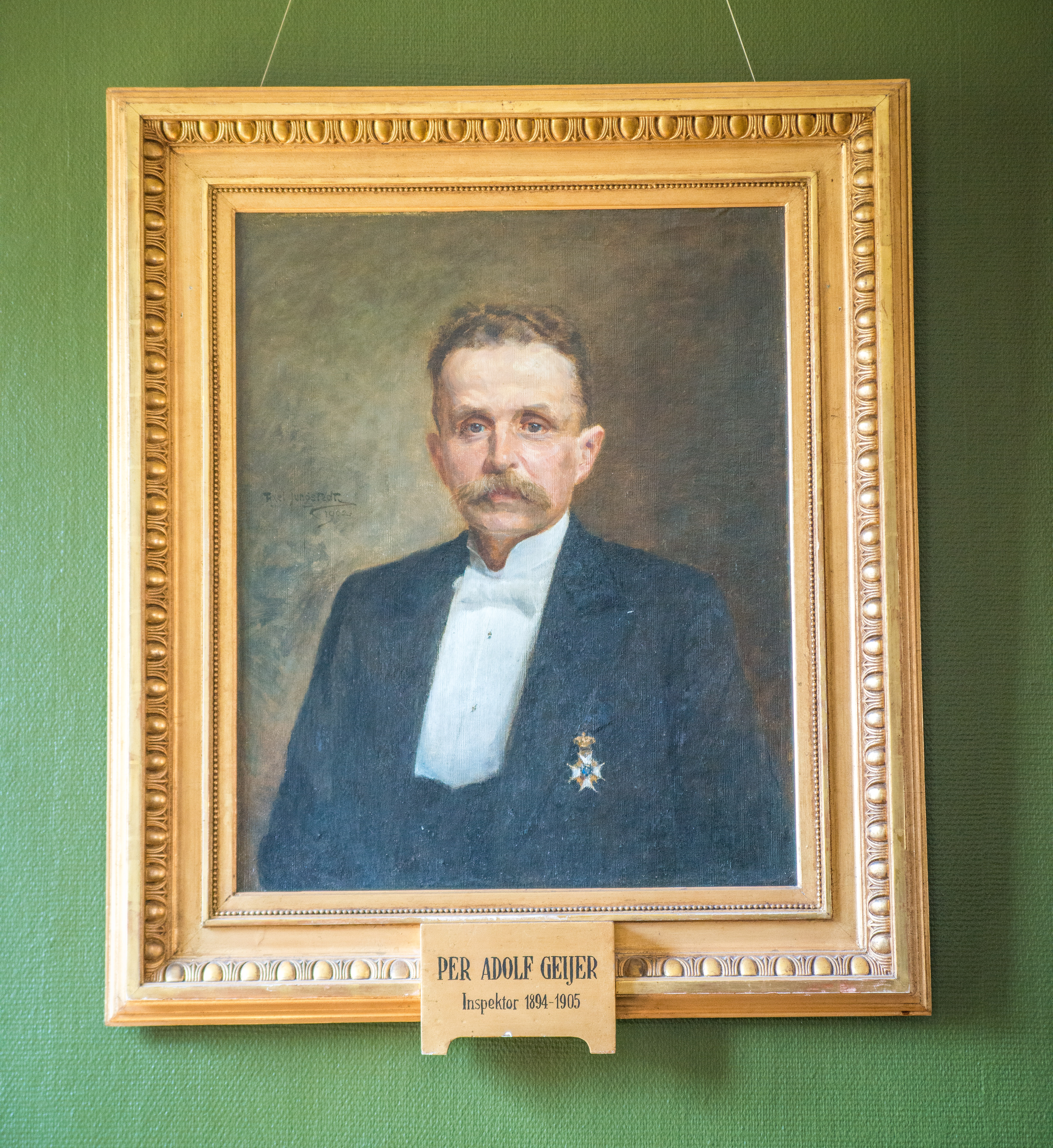
Per Adolf Geijer, inspector 1895–1905

== Oxenstiernska huset - the former nation house ==
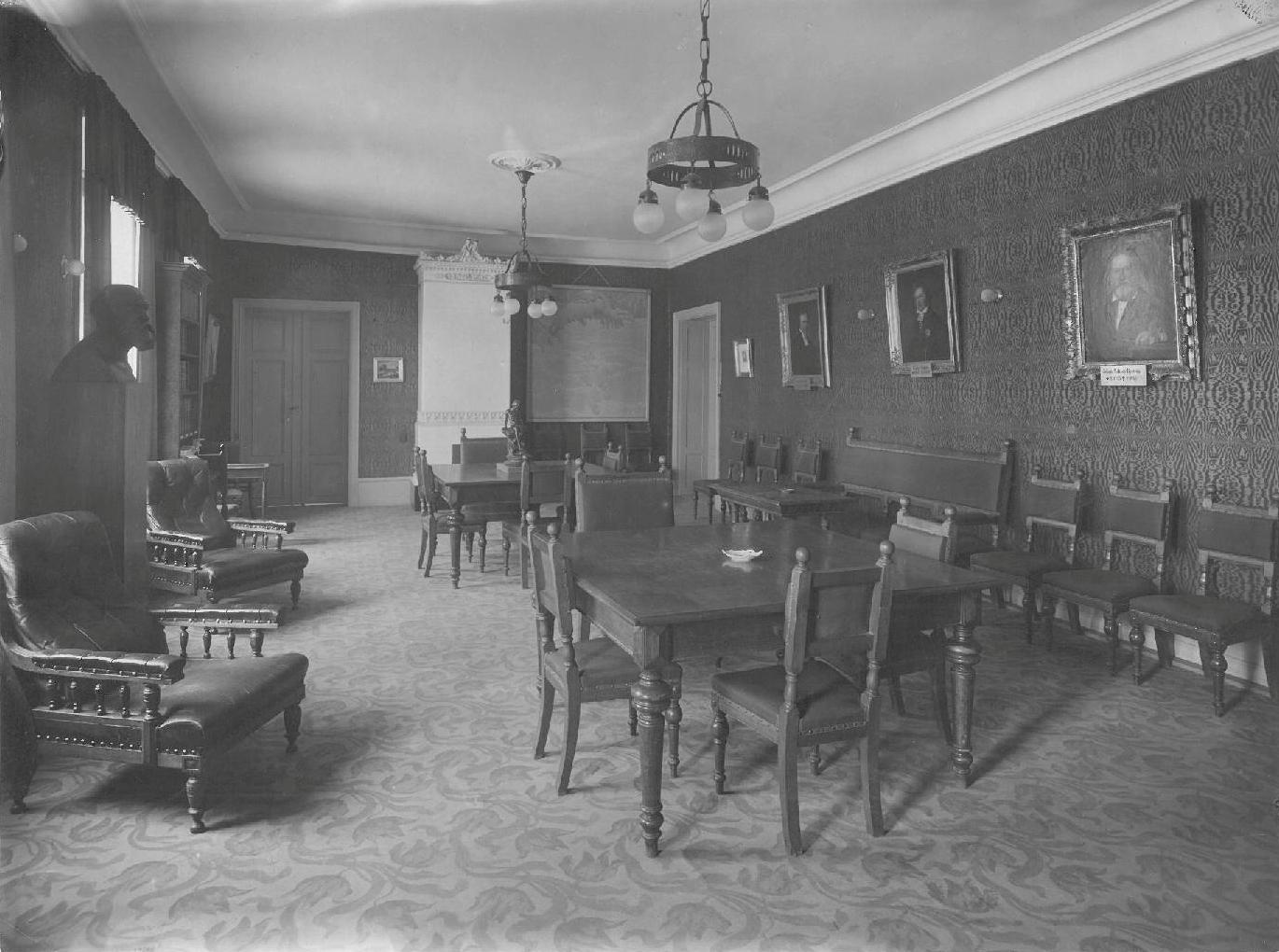

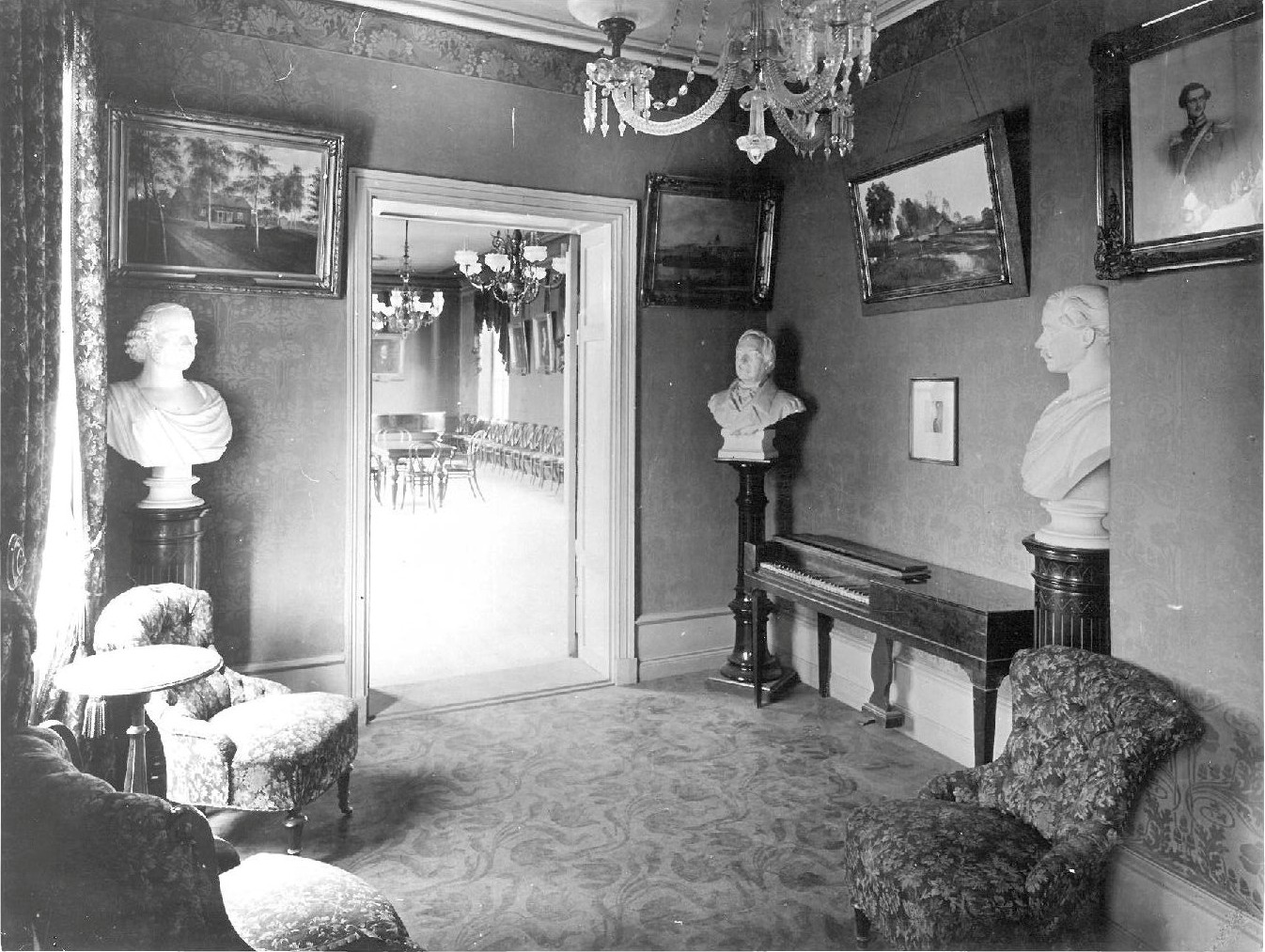

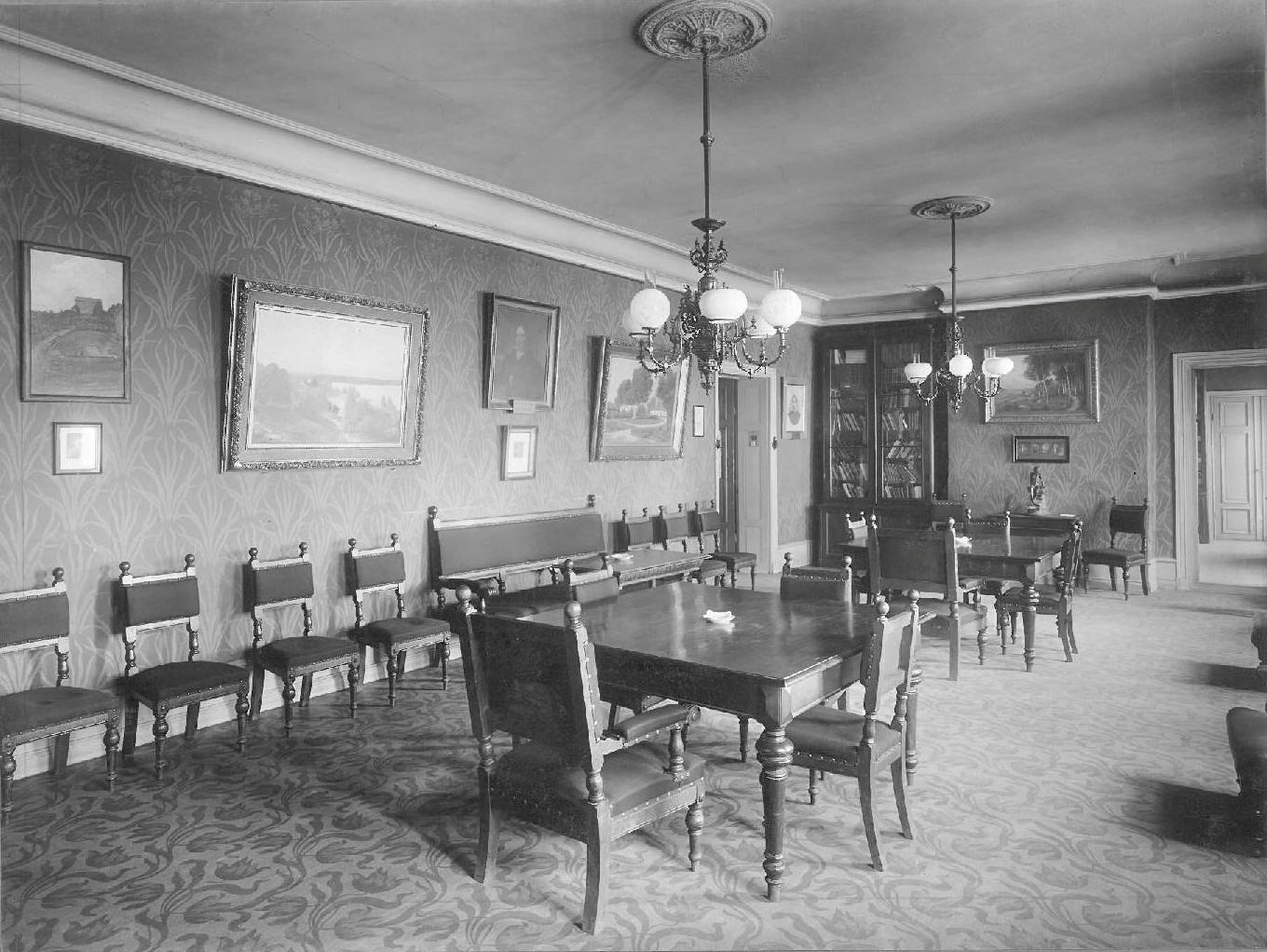

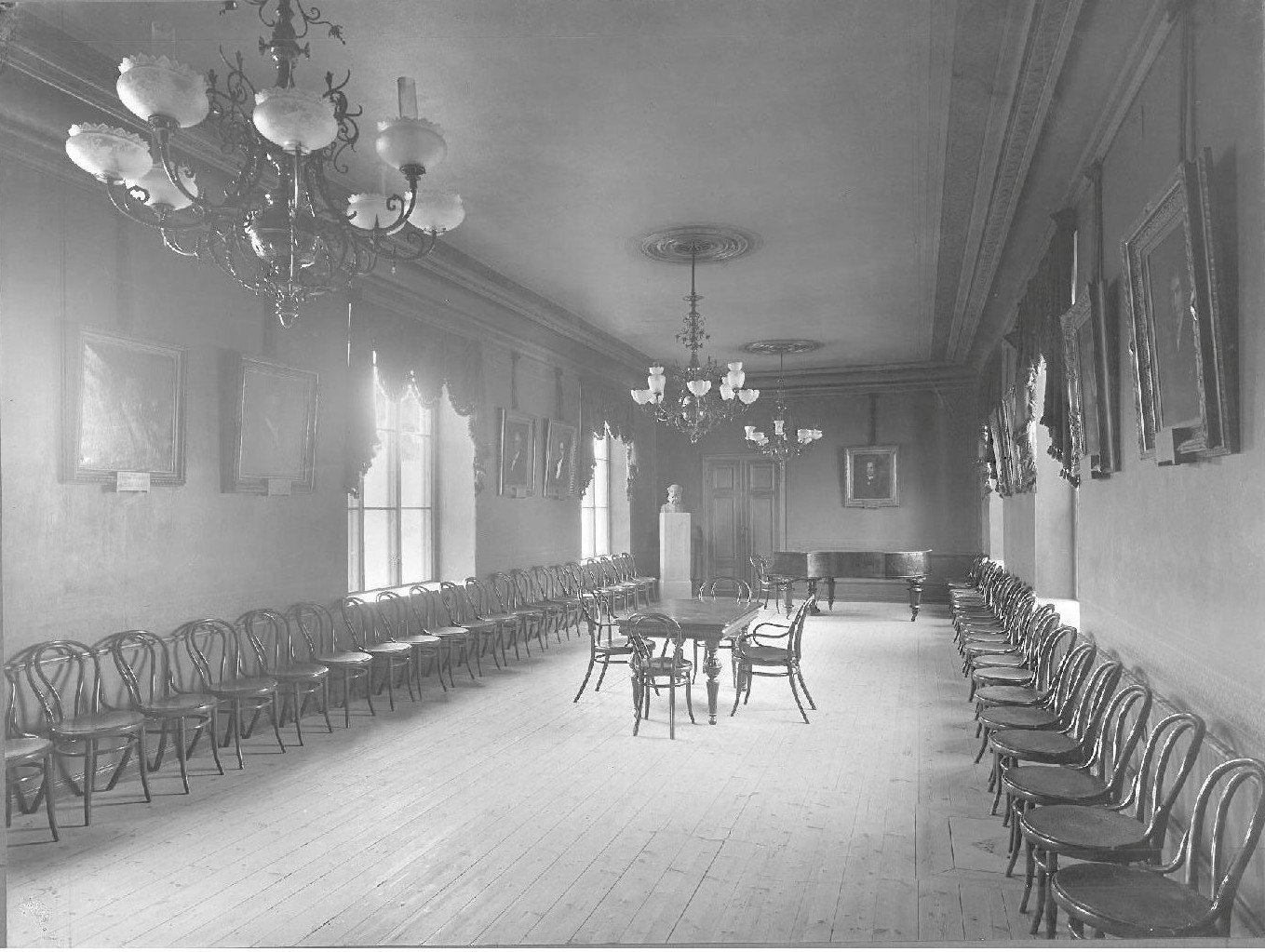

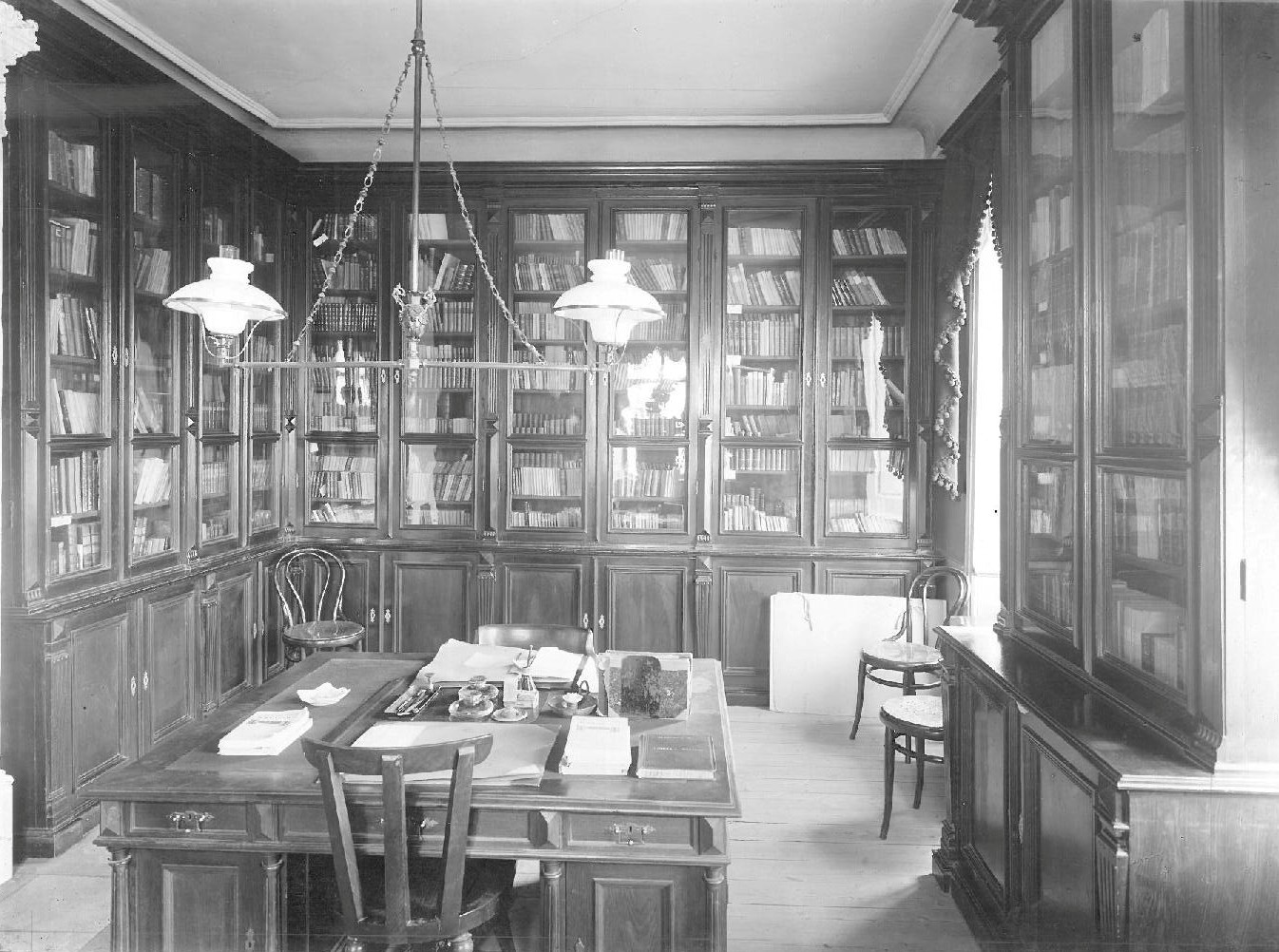

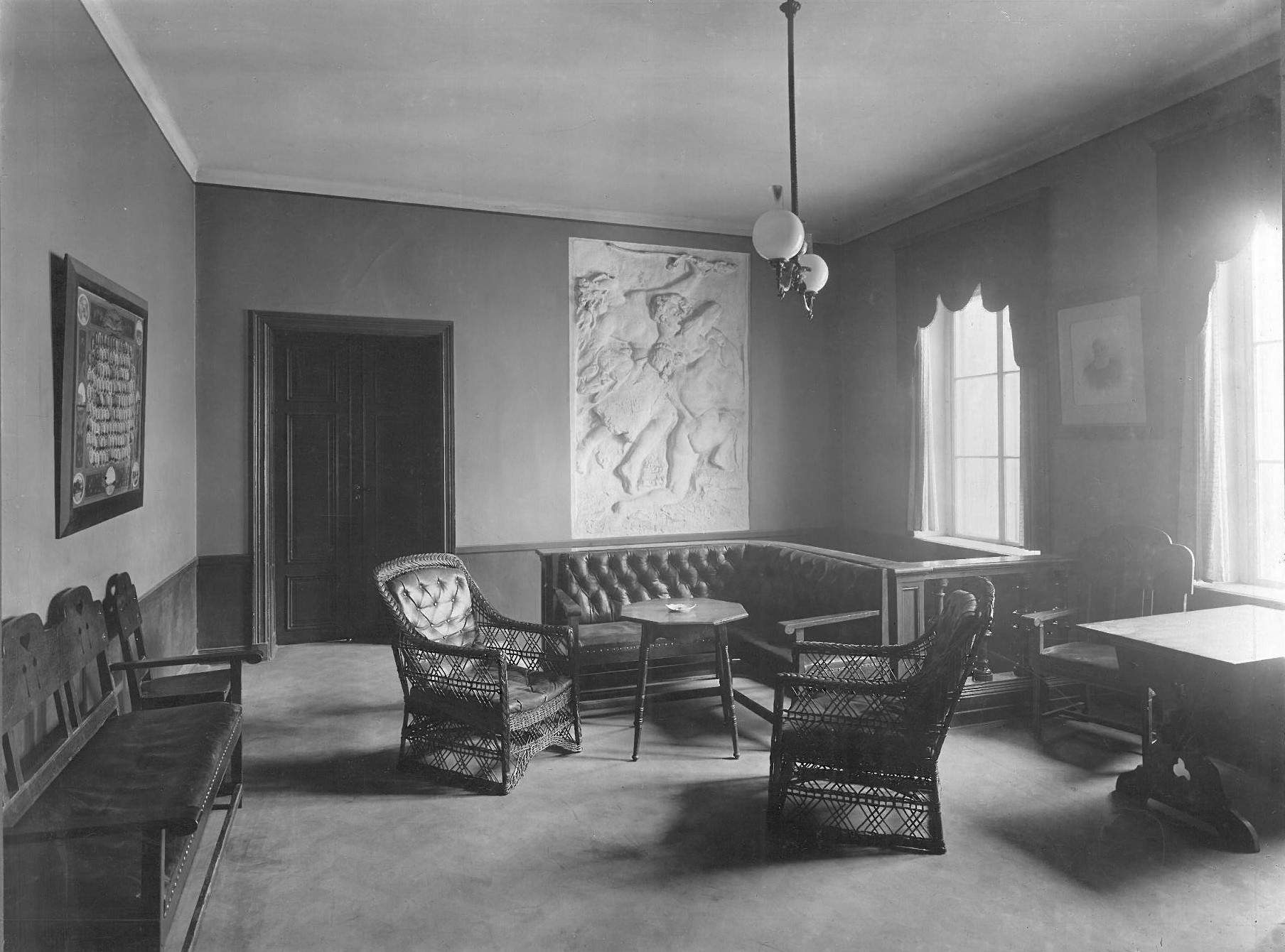

== Inspektors ==
Värmlands nation

- Jordan Edenius 1663–1667
- Gabriel Emporagrius 1667–1670
- Johan Gartmannus 1670–1684
- Petrus Lagerlöf 1684–1699
- Carl Gyllenborg 1699
- Carl Lundius 1699–1714
- Olof Celsius 1714–1756
- Lars Benzelstjerna 1756–1760
- Johan Låstbom 1760–1797
- Emanuel Ekman 1797–1801
- Pehr von Afzelius 1801–1824
- Erik Gustaf Geijer 1824–1846
- Gustaf Svanberg 1846–1852
- Sigurd Ribbing 1852–1885
- Carl Yngve Sahlin 1885–1894
- Per Adolf Geijer 1895–1905
- Karl Reinhold Geijer 1905–1914
- Nils Johan Göransson 1914–1925
- Gustaf Vilhelm Lizell 1925–1935
- Östen Undén 1935–1937
- Arvid Runestam 1937–1938
- Sune Lindqvist 1938–1949
- Arne Fredga 1949–1956
- Bror Rexed 1956–1968
- Gunnar Arpi 1968–1987
- Åke Frändberg 1987–2004
- Lars Burman 2004–

== See also ==
- List of Uppsala University nations
