= Göteborgs nation, Uppsala =

Student nation at Uppsala University, Sweden

Coordinates: 59°51′34.5″N 17°37′48″E

Göteborg's Nation
- Uppsala University
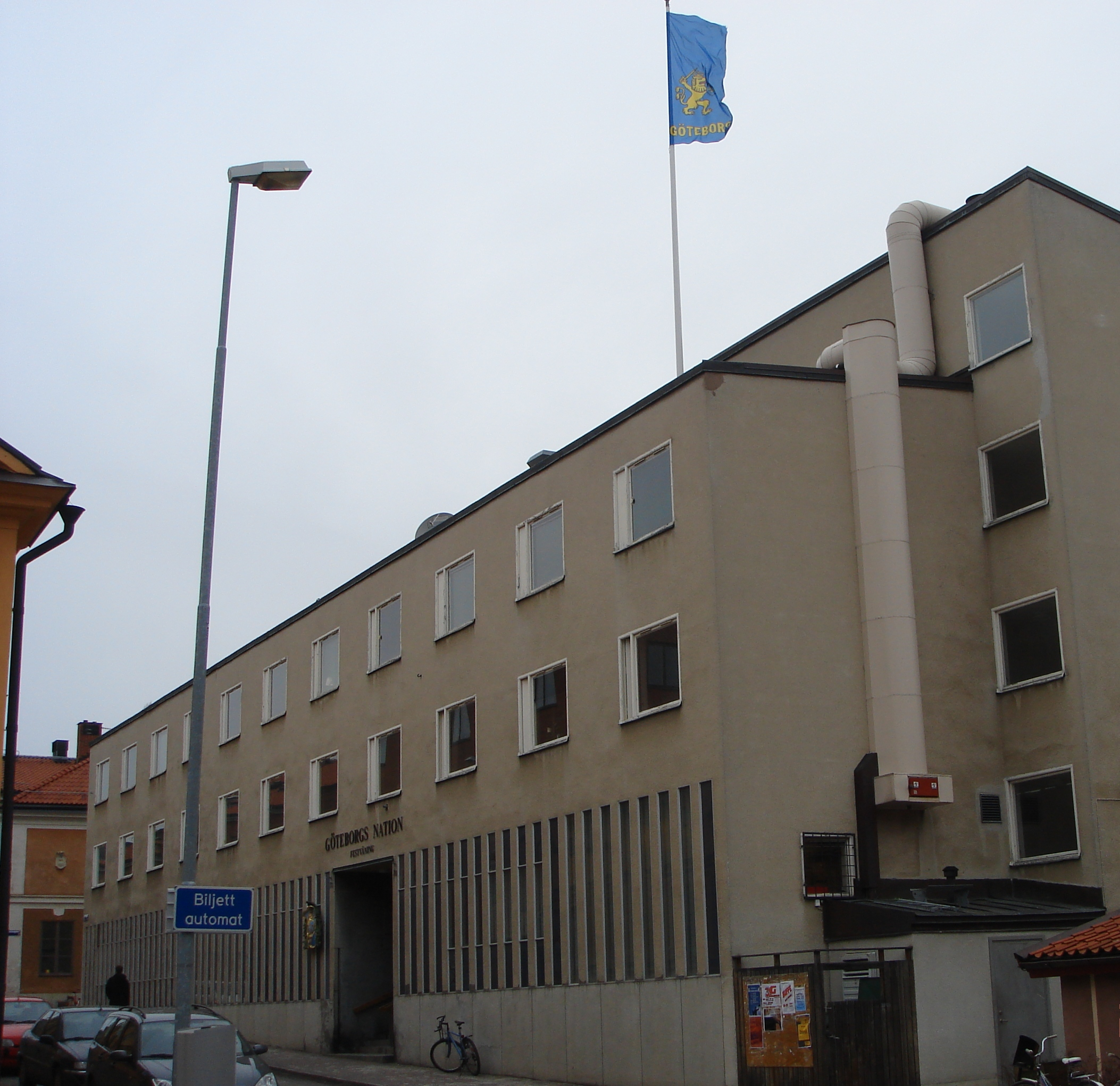
- Location: S:t Larsgatan 7A, 753 11 Uppsala; Sweden
- Latin name: Natio Gothoburgensis
- Abbreviation: N/A
- Established: 1667
- Inspektor: Ingrid Helmius
- Membership: approx. 500
- Website: www.goteborgsnation.se

Göteborgs nation is one of the 13 student nations at Uppsala University. It was founded in 1667. Göteborgs nation was originally aimed primarily at students from Gothenburg, Bohuslän and Halland.

== Inspektors ==
Göteborgs nation

- Olaus Åkerman 1667–1678
- Petrus Holm 1678–1686
- Carolus Lundius 1686–1715
- Petrus Schyllberg 1715–1736
- Samuel Klingenstierna 1736–1756
- Mårten Strömer 1756–1757
- Carl Fredrik Georgii 1757–1782
- Erik Mikael Fant 1782–1816
- Pehr Fabian Aurivillius 1816–1829
- Samuel Grubbe 1830–1840
- Johan Thorsander 1840–1851
- Fredrik Ferdinand Carlson 1851–1863
- Anders Fredrik Beckman 1863–1864
- August Almén 1864–1883
- Otto Ferdinand Myrberg 1883–1892
- Adolf Noreen 1892–1919
- Edgar Reuterskiöld 1919–1928
- Robin Fåhraeus 1928–1931
- Gustaf Bergmark 1932–1936
- Sven Ekman 1937–1941
- Fredrik Berg 1941–1952
- Bernhard Jacobowsky 1952–1960
- Nils Gösta Sandblad 1960–1963
- Sten Lindroth 1963–1972
- Martin H:son Holmdahl 1972–1990
- Erik Kjellberg 1990-1997
- Sverker Lindblad 1998–2004
- Per Hansson 2004–2013
- Ingrid Helmius 2013-
