= Norrlands nation =

Student nation of Uppsala University

Coordinates: 59°51′26.11″N 17°38′15.83″E

Norrland's Nation
- Uppsala University
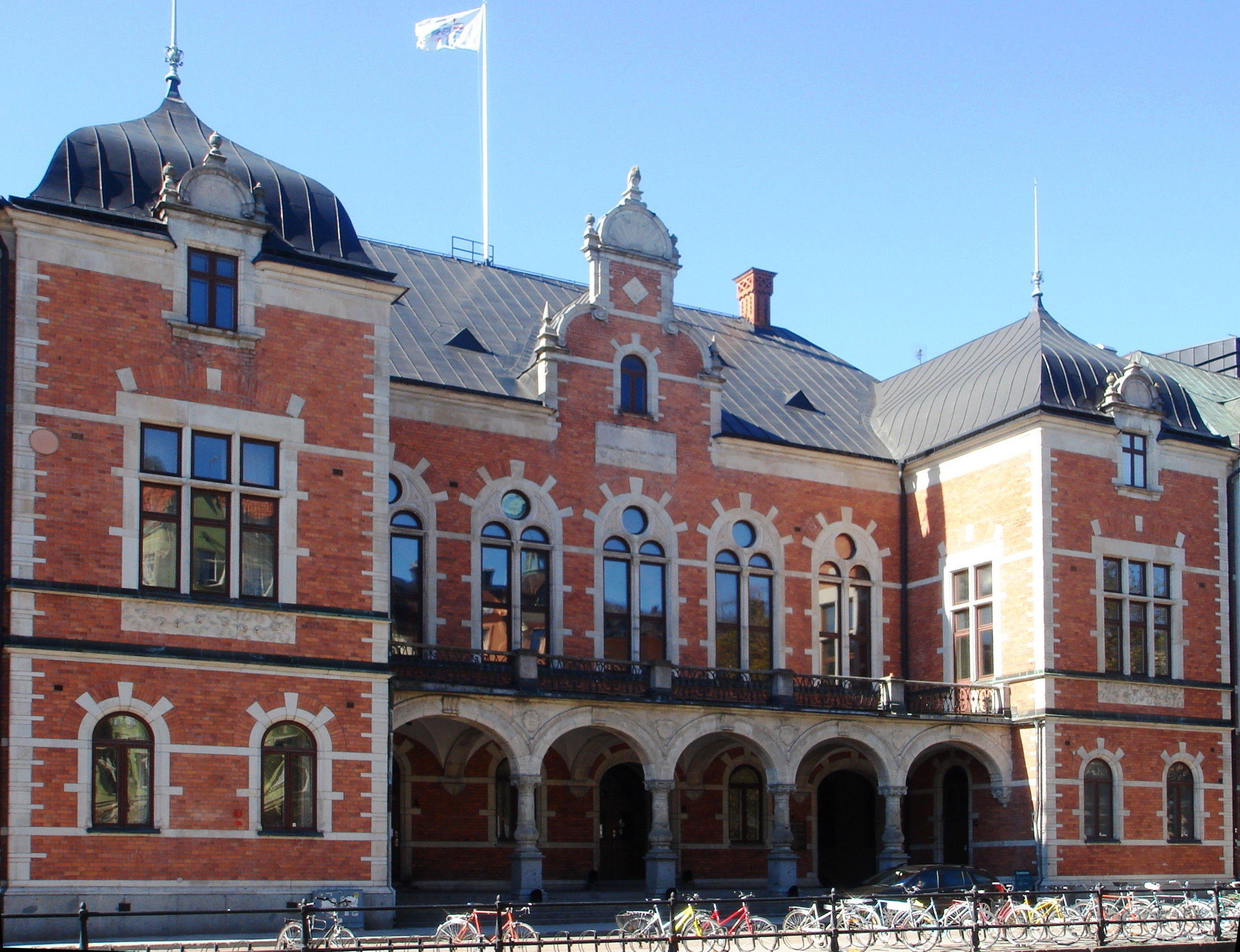
- Location: Västra Ågatan 14; 753 11 Uppsala; Sweden
- Latin name: Natio Norlandica
- Established: 1646; 380 years ago
- Inspektor: Tobias Sjöblom
- Membership: approx. 8000
- Website: www.norrlandsnation.se

Norrlands nation is a student society and the largest of thirteen nations at Uppsala University. It mainly recruits its members from the province of Norrland, which is the northernmost part of Sweden. As of 2012, the nation has about 8,000 members.

The nation is religiously and politically unaffiliated and offers its members access to libraries, housing, scholarships and opportunities to participate in a wide range of sporting, cultural and entertainment activities.

Norrlands nation was formed in 1827 through a merger of some smaller nations with roots dating back to the mid 17th century.

The nation owns a building complex of 5,500 square metres by the Fyris River in central Uppsala, with the older part from 1889, the facade being designed by Swedish architect Isak Gustaf Clason. The newer part was opened in 1972 and was designed by the Swedish architect Lars Carlbring.

The students' association for students from Medelpad in Norrlands nation is named after the fictitious skvader from the Medelpad area.

== Inspektors ==
Ångermanländska nation

- Johan Buskagrius 1667–1676
- Mattias Steuchius 1676–1683
- Petrus Holm 1683–1688
- Nils Wolf Stiernberg 1689–1694
- Johan Salenius 1695–1697
- Hemming Forelius 1697–1708
- Fabian Törner 1709–1731
- Anders Boberg 1732–1756
- Johan Gottschalk Wallerius 1756–1767
- Eric Hesselgren 1767–1779
- Per Niklas Christiernin 1779–1799
- Daniel Boëthius 1799–1800

Västerbottniska nation

- Erik Benzelius the Elder 1667–1687
- Hemming Forelius 1688–1708
- Fabian Törner 1708–1731
- Matthias Asp 1731–1763
- Johan Floderus 1763–1789 this links to the wrong person
- Daniel Boëthius 1789–1800

Bottniska nation

- Daniel Boëthius 1800–1811
- Nils Fredrik Biberg 1811–1827

Medelpado-Jämtländska nation

- Petrus Holm 1686–1688
- Andreas Giöding 1689–1704
- Johan Upmark 1705–1717
- Johannes Steuchius 1717–1723
- Eric Alstrin 1724–1732
- Georg Wallin 1733–1737
- Anders Celsius 1738–1744
- Petrus Ullén 1745–1747
- Daniel Solander 1748–1785
- Eric Michael Fant 1785–1816
- Johan Bredman 1816–1827

Norrlands nation

- Johan Bredman 1827–1840
- Jonas Sellén 1841–1851
- Carl Olof Delldén 1851–1854
- Christopher Jacob Boström 1854–1863
- Olof Glas 1863–1877
- Frans Wilhelm Häggström 1878–1887
- Einar Löfstedt 1887–1889
- Robert Sundelin 1889–1896
- Harald Hjärne 1896–1899
- Arvid Högbom 1899–1909
- Nils Edén 1909–1920
- Thore Engströmer 1921–1943
- Gunnar Blix 1943–1961
- Carl Martin Edsman 1961–1967
- Torgny Segerstedt 1967–1978
- Stig Strömholm 1978–2003
- Tore Frängsmyr 2003–2011
- Cecilia Pahlberg 2011–2023
- Tobias Sjöblom 2023–
