= Kalmar nation, Uppsala =

Student nation of Uppsala University

Coordinates: 59°51′32.468″N 17°37′37.45″E

Kalmar Nation
- Uppsala University
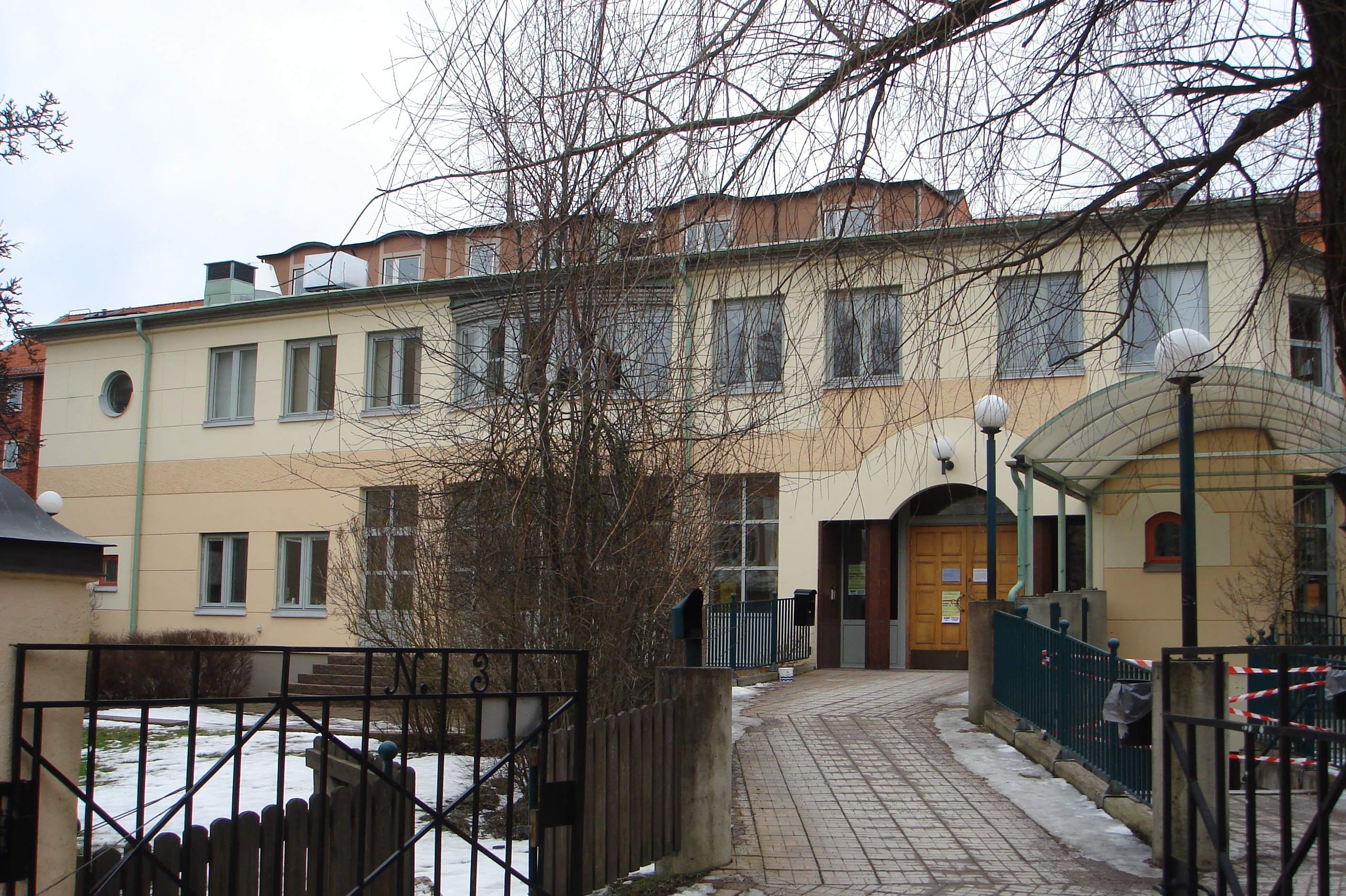
- Location: Svartmangatan 3; 732 12 Uppsala
- Latin name: Natio Calmariensis
- Established: 1663
- Inspektor: Maria Selmer
- Membership: approx 1300
- Website: kalmarnation.se

Kalmar nation is one of the thirteen student nations (student society) at Uppsala university in Sweden. It is named for the city of Kalmar.

Kalmar nation was founded in 1663 when the old Smålands nation split into two; Kalmar representing eastern Småland and the island of Öland, and Wexiö nation representing the west of Småland.

Kalmar nation currently has around 1,700 members and is considered a somewhat 'alternative' nation, focusing on live music, providing for vegetarian and vegan diets, and regularly hosting a night clubs.

== Inspektors ==
Kalmar nation inspektors

Years	Name
1663–1667	Johan Bergenhielm
1663	Folke Uhr
1668–1672	Claes Arrhenius
1672–1689	Andreas Nordenhielm
1690–1697	Johan Schwede
1698–1712	Harald Vallerius
1712–1718	Johan Vallerius
1719–1748	Anders Grönwall
1749–1764	Nils Wallerius
1764–1789	Johan Floderus
1790–1810	Nils Landerbeck
1810–1838	Olof Kolmodin den yngre
1838–1857	Johan Henrik Schröder
1857–1878	Wilhelm Lilljeborg
1878–1880	Carl Hammarskjöld
1880–1881	Wilhelm Erik Svedelius
1882–1894	Isak Sven Landtmanson
1895–1906	Olof Hammarsten
1906–1925	Ulrik Quensel
1925–1948	Louis Backman
1948–1957	Tord Palander
1957–1960	Ivar Modéer
1960–1970	Gösta Liljequist
1970–1975	Sonja Lyttkens
1975–1998	Lars König Königsson
1998–2006	Birgitta Garme
2006–2020	Anders Ahlén
2021–present	Maria Selmer
