= Smålands nation, Uppsala =

Student nation of Uppsala University

Coordinates: 59°51′33.7″N 17°37′50″E

Småland's Nation
- Uppsala University
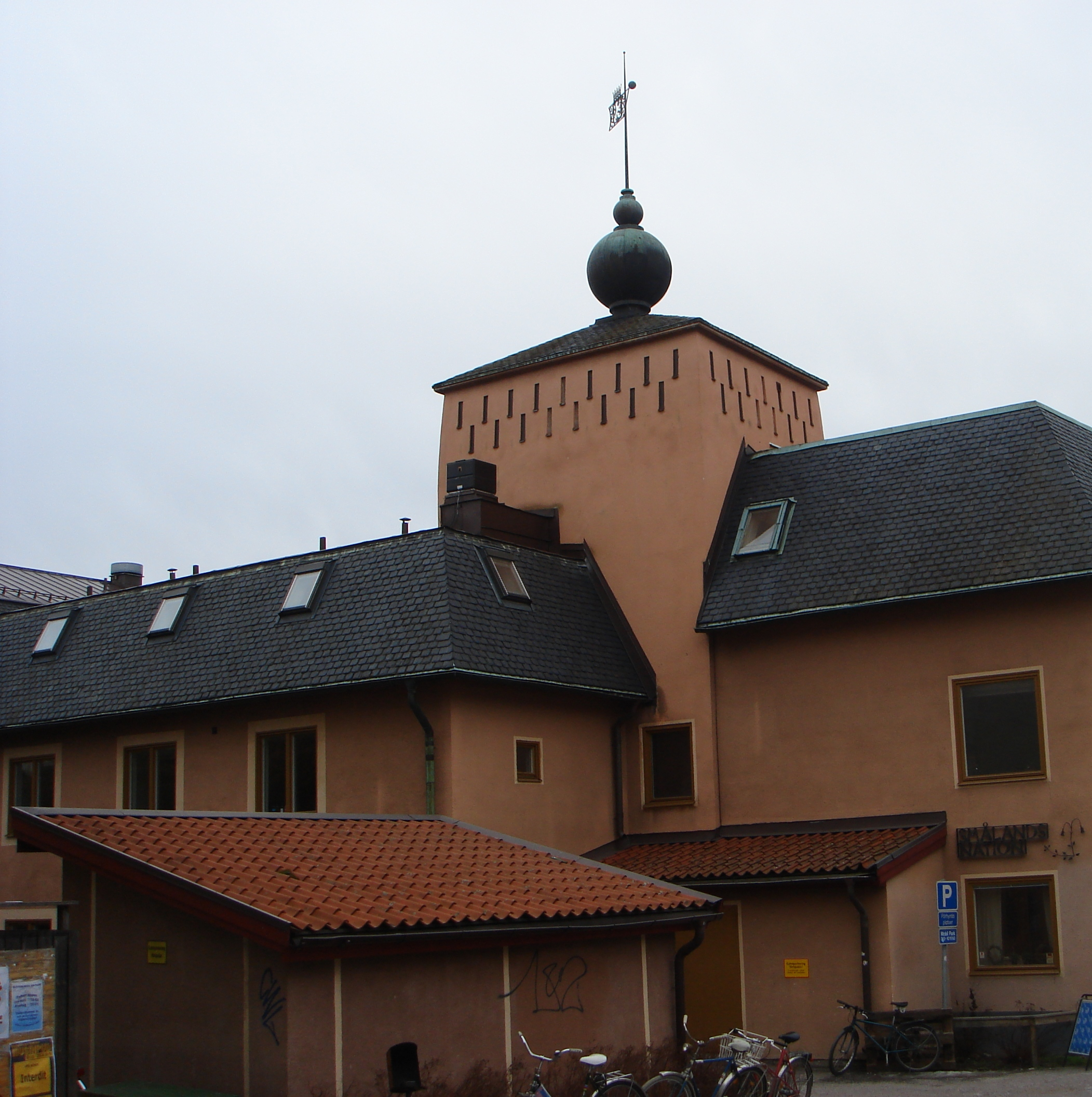
- Location: S:t Larsgatan 5; 753 11 Uppsala; Sweden
- Latin name: Natio Smolandica
- Abbreviation: N/A
- Established: 1645
- Inspektor: Mattias Dahlberg
- Membership: approx. 1200
- Website: www.smalands.nu

Smålands nation is one of the thirteen student nations (a kind of student society) at Uppsala university in Sweden. It has around 1500 members, many of them international students. Smålands nation is well known for its live music scene and for its generous scholarships.

The nation was founded in 1645, and originally contained what is now Kalmar nation. In 1663 however, the nation was split into two nations named Wexiö nation and Kalmar nation. Following a disagreement between the two nations in 1667, Wexiö nation once again took the name Smålands nation.

The current nation house was built in 1954 and is located on S:t Larsgatan 5, close to Uppsala Domkyrka and the Fyris river.

== Inspektors ==
Smålands nation

- Petrus Rudbeckius 1663–1679
- Andreas Spole 1680–1699
- Carolus Lundius 1699–1715
- Petrus Elvius 1715–1718
- Johannes Hermansson 1718–1737
- Anders Celsius 1737–1744
- Carl von Linné 1744–1778
- Johan Floderus 1778–1789
- Carl Peter Thunberg 1789–1828
- Samuel Ödmann 1828–1829
- Per Sjöbring 1830–1842
- Elias Magnus Fries 1842–1850
- Otto Fredrik Tullberg 1850–1853
- Elias Magnus Fries 1853–1858
- Wilhelm Lilljeborg 1858–1866
- Herman Ludvig Rydin 1866–1873
- Wilhelm Lilljeborg 1873–1882
- Thore Fries 1882–1899
- Nils Dunér 1899–1903
- Otto Lindfors 1903–1909
- Sven Gustaf Hedin 1909–1913
- Gustaf Granqvist 1913–1918
- Edgar Reuterskiöld 1918–1919
- Otto Lagercrantz 1919–1933
- Emanuel Linderholm 1933–1934
- Gunnar Rudberg 1934–1940
- Carl Olof Nylén 1940–1958
- Josef Svennung 1958–1961
- Nils Fries 1961–1970
- Sten Carlsson 1970–1985
- Sven Nilsson 1986–1988
- Ulf Göranson 1988–1998
- Carl Reinhold Bråkenhielm 1998–2007
- Mattias Dahlberg 2007–

== See also ==
- Småland Nation, Lund
