= Hallands Nation, Lund =

Student nation of Lund University

Coordinates: 55°42′20″N 13°12′40″E

Hallands Nation
- Student nation
- Lund University
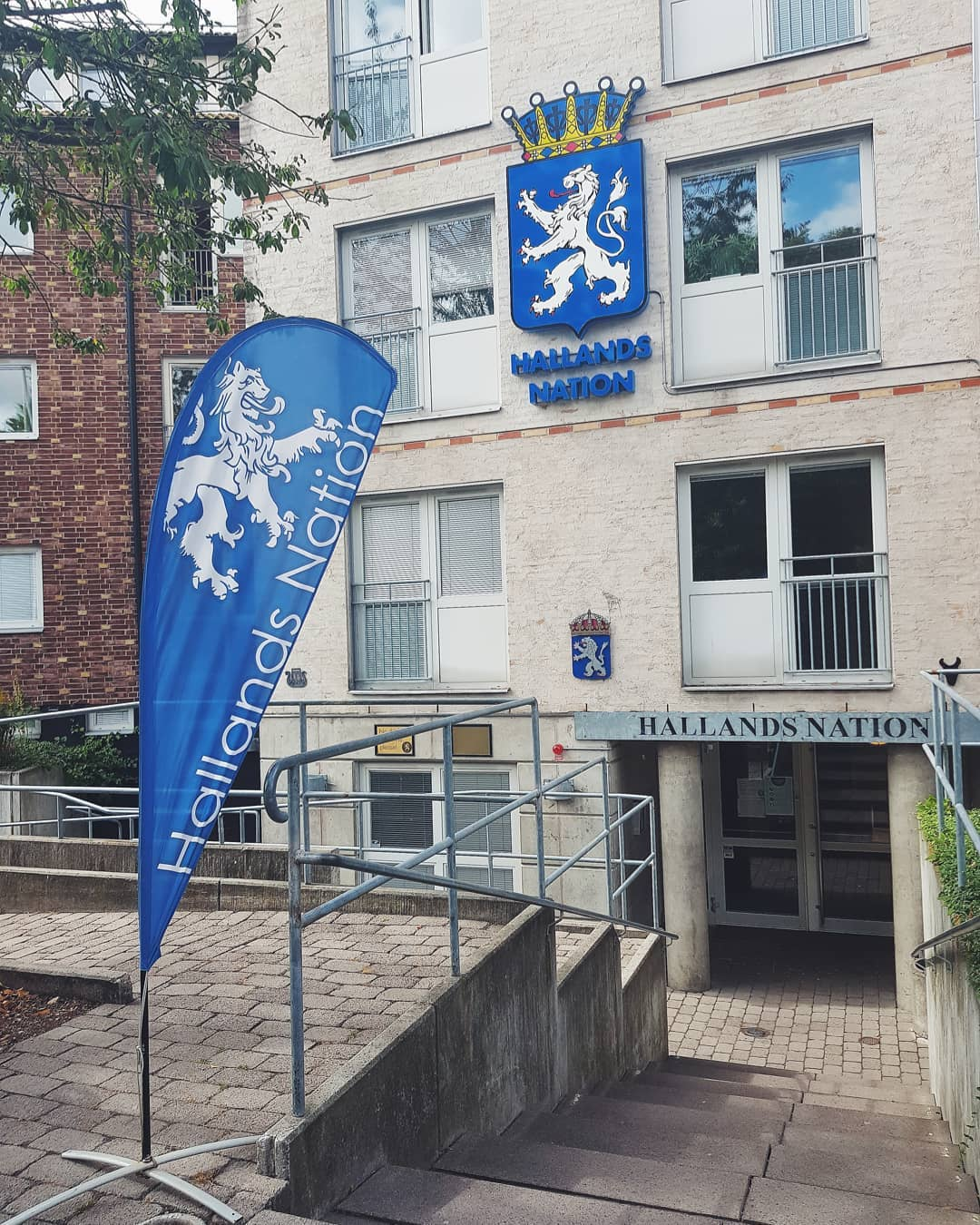
- Location: Thomanders väg 3, Lund, Sweden
- Full name: Hallands Nation
- Abbreviation: HL
- Founded: 1928
- Namesake: Halland, Sweden
- Inspektor: Johan Stenström
- Membership: 1,133 (2026)
- Website: https://www.hallandsnation.se/

Hallands nation is one of thirteen student nations of Lund University in Sweden. It has 1,133 members and is thus the ninth-largest student nation in Lund - ranking behind Blekingska but ahead of Sydskånska.

The youngest of Lund's nations, it originally organised students from the Swedish province of Halland.

== History ==
The thought of forming a Nation of their own had been on the minds of Hallandian students in Lund since at least 1920. At the time, these students was part of Göteborgs Nation. In 1922, the Halland Student's Society (Halländska studentföreningen) was formed to unite students from the Halland province. The uniting factor of the society solidified the idea of a Halland Nation and the question of secession from Göteborgs Nation had repeatedly been up for serious consideration. In 1926, one such proposal was rejected within Göteborgs Nation. On November 22, 1927, a "large number" of Halland students gathered to confer and to assemble a united stance on the question of secession. It was decided that an official request be made to university authorities to allow for the secession of Halland's students from Göteborgs Nation. In a letter written by a medical student named Otto Geier, the rationale for secession was made clear: firstly, the old principle of organizing Nations by diocese had at this point been abandoned for many years. Secondly, but most importantly, the difficulties of Hallandians having to identify with and act in unison together with Gothenburgers had led to noticeable division - with Geier describing an overbearing "feeling of homelessness within Göteborgs Nation" on behalf of the Hallandians. Furthermore, the Hallandians were not least frequently disregarded when applying for Nation stipends. Less than three months later, on February 14, 1928, Göteborgs Nation convened at Akademiska Föreningen and formally decided to support the secession of Hallands as an independent student nation. A few months later, Albert Nilsson was chosen as the Nation's first Inspektor, and Gösta Stenvinkel as the Nation's first Qurator. During its first semester of existence, the Nation had 84 members. Although nominally formed in February, the Nation itself observes October 15, 1928 as the date of the Nation's founding.

== Organisation ==
Hallands Nation has 1,046 members. Some 69 people are responsible for 79 different posts within the nation's organisational structure. Five of these are part of the so-called Quratel, which is the main governing body of the nation. A further eleven people are part of the Seniorskollegium, which functions as the board of the nation. Seven people form an election committee, interviewing and nominating people to hold posts within the nation. All of these are in turn elected by a general meeting of the nation's members. A separate post is that of Inspector, a teacher of the university elected by the nation and approved by the vice-chancellor, who presides over meetings and performs some ceremonial duties.

== Inspectors ==
- Albert Nilsson (1928–1932)
- Torsten Hellman (1930–1932)
- Ragnar Bergendal (1932–1951)
- Karl Gustav Ljunggren (1951–1958)
- Sölve Welin (1958–1970)
- Gunnar Bramstång (1970–1999) (currently honorary inspector)
- Allan T. Malm (1999-2014)

== Honorary members (selection) ==
- Ernst Wigforss (1937)
- Fredrik Ström (1945)
- Prins Bertil (1948)
- Alf Ahlberg (1948)
- Hakon Ahlberg (1955)
- Bo Giertz (1955)
- Erik Olson (1959)
- Yngve Holmberg (1971?)
- Bertil Gärtner (1980)
- Ingemund Bengtsson (1984)
- Bengt Samuelsson (1988)
- Carl Bildt (1995)
- Björn Hellberg (1998)
- Bengt Johansson (2001)
- Johan Staël von Holstein (2006)
- Lasse Brandeby (2009)

== The house ==
Halland's Nation's house is located at Thomanders väg 1-5 near Västgöta Nation's house at Tornavägen. The house, or Hallandsgården 1,2 & 3 as the now three houses are really called, were originally two separate buildings built in 1955 and 1959 at what was then the outskirts of the city. In the middle of the 1990s the two houses were joined with a new house built between them - Hallandsgården 3.

During the construction of Hallandsgården 3 the two houses and the roughly 70 students' rooms they contained were thoroughly renovated. An additional fourth floor, slightly narrower than the lower floors was also built on top of the two houses. The reason for this fourth floor being narrower than the rest was due to the then city architect of Lund who didn't want the most beautiful house fronts of the 1950s to be destroyed by and additional floor.

This meant that an additional two corridors of student housing were added to the already existing six, at the top of the two original buildings from 1955 and 1959. The newest part of the house, Hallandsgården 3, which was finished in 1996, does not only contain some twenty students' rooms with kitchens but also the main office of the nation. On the top floor is the common party hall, called "Hallands Ås".

== Activities ==
Anapart from day-to-day activities such as lunches, pubs and clubs, the nation also arranges several different festivities throughout the year.

- Bockbalen: The nation's yearly ball, usually held during March. It was first celebrated in 1966 and has, with the exception of a few years during the 1970s, been held every year since.
- Hedviggillet: To celebrate the forming of Hallands Nation there is a celebration every autumn. During the day there are games held between Hallands Nation, Göteborgs Nation and visiting friendly nations and societies. During the evening there is a large sittning.
- Kulknappsbalen: A ball held at very special occasions in order to honor the memory of king Charles XII who was according to legend killed when he was shot with a uniform button. It is held elsewhere than Lund, and was last held at Varberg fortress on October 18, 2008, to mark the 80th anniversary of the forming of the nation.
- Laxen: During the evening of the last of April there is a traditional salmon dinner at Hallands Ås.

== Friendships ==
- Uppsala: Gotlands nation
- Helsingfors: Kymenlaakson osakunta
- Copenhagen: Studenterforeningen
- Halmstad: Änglarådet at the Military Academy of Halmstad
- Halmstad: The Student Union of the University of Halmstad

== Slave Auction controversy ==
In 2011, Tidningen Lundagård reported that a group of three persons had attended a Hallands Nation workers sittning [students' dinner party] wearing blackface makeup. At the sittning, which had a jungle theme, the three attendees had been led inside wearing ropes around their necks. They were later "sold" at the sittning as part of a mock slave auction. The group was later spotted and confronted by another student at Helsingkrona Nation's nightclub. Jallow Momodou, chairman of the National Afro-Swedish Association (Afrosvenskarnas riksförbund) who had filed a police report against Hallands and Helsingkrona Nations, received multiple death threats as a consequence, and was forced to move away together with his family. After the then-Qurator of Hallands Nation had described the mock auction as "a joke", a representative of Kuratorskollegiet, an umbrella organization of twelve of Lund's thirteen student nations, condemned the events as antithetical to the purpose of the nations.

The University administration was criticized for being passive in its response, as the institution's Disciplinary Committee cannot act when incidents occur outside of university property and/or the realm of education. A year later, a man who had in connection to the event put up posters depicting Jallow Momodou as a chained slave, was convicted of inciting racial hatred and defamation and was fined. The students who depicted the slave auction were not charged with a crime.

The controversy garnered international attention, with Jesse Jackson and the European Network Against Racism both sending letters of condemnation to the Swedish government, with the latter organization urging disciplinary action against the involved students.
