= Sydskånska Nationen =

Student nation at Lund University, Sweden

South Scanian Nation
- Sydskånska nationen
- Student nation
- Lund University
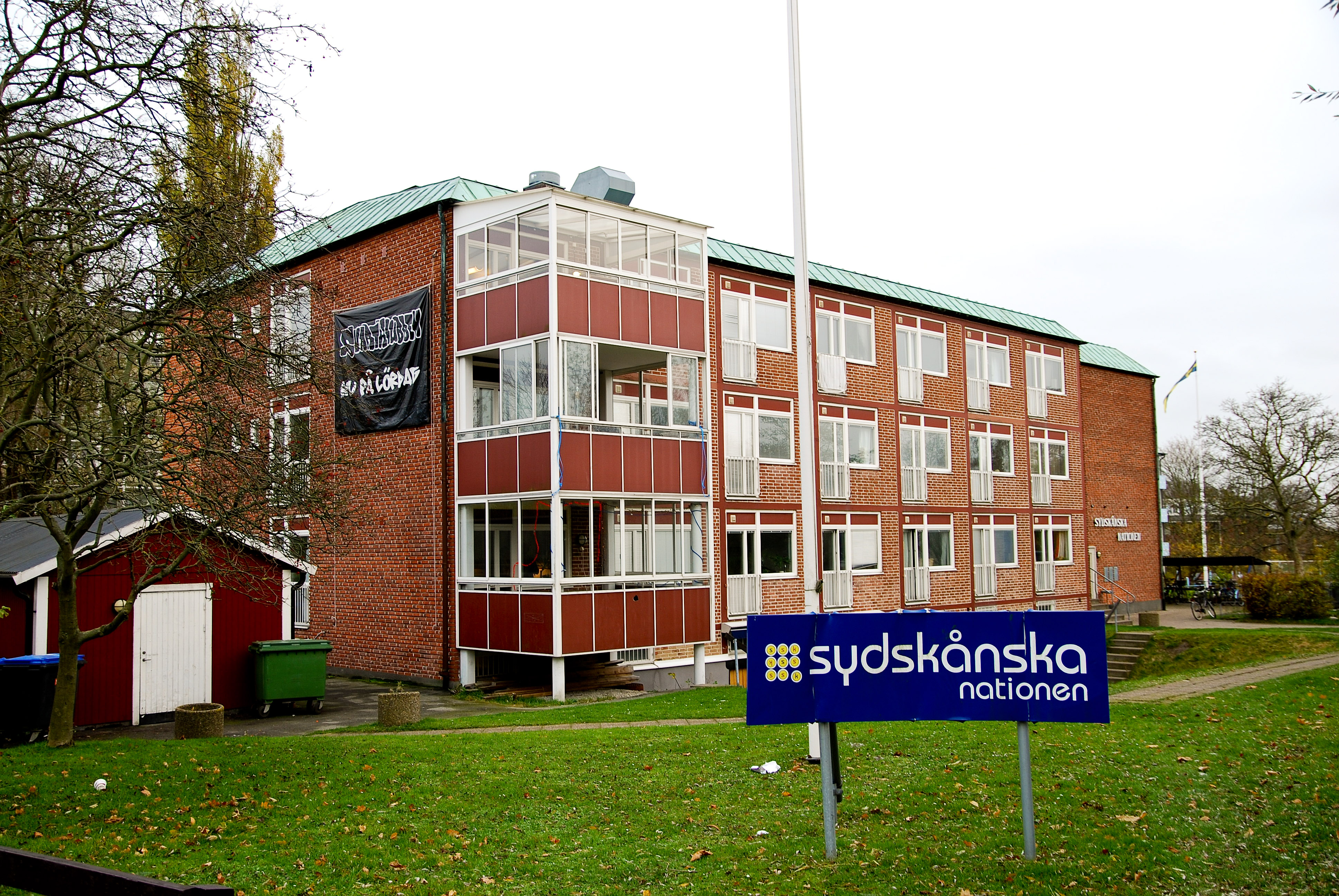
- Latin name: Natio Scaniae Meridionalis
- Abbreviation: SSK
- Established: 1890
- Namesake: South Skåne, Sweden
- Former names: Ystads nation
- Inspektor: Torbjörn Forslid
- Membership: 881 (2026)

Sydskånska Nationen (South Scanian Nation), formerly Ystads nation, is one of thirteen student nations at Lund University, Sweden. With 881 members, it is the tenth-largest nation in Lund, ranking behind Hallands, but ahead of Kristianstads Nation.

== History ==
The nation has its origins in one of the university's first nations, Skånska Nationen (named after, and composed of students from Scania) which existed from the late 1600s to 1833, when its size essentially forced the nation to split into six chapters. In 1889, it was decided that five of the chapters were to be reformed as Nations in their own right, dissolving Skånska Nationen. Thus, on January 1, 1890, the Nations that are known today by the names of Malmö, Lunds, Sydskånska, Kristianstads and Helsingborgs-Landskrona were formed. Sydskånska nationen was originally named Ystads nation, until a name change in 1955.

== Palestine controversy ==
In 2024, two motions were submitted to Sydskånska, as well as other nations, urging the nations to condemn the actions of the university and the Swedish state in relation to the war in Gaza, as well as to take a stance for "human rights and students' rights to protest in support for the Palestinian liberation movement". The motions were sanctioned by the Lund Students for Palestine organization who had encouraged similar actions at Kalmar and Blekingska nations. The motions were dismissed by Sydskånska's board, who stated that adopting them would be in violation of the nation's statutes which mandate political and religious neutrality. Supporters of the motions allegedly tried to disrupt the proceedings of the Sydskånska nation meeting, and weeks later attempted a motion of no-confidence against the nation's Kurator. None of the motions passed, and Kurator Noa Liungman remained on his post.
