= Kristianstads nation =

Student nation at Lund University, Sweden

Coordinates: 55°42′32.5″N 13°12′27″E

- Student nation
- Lund University
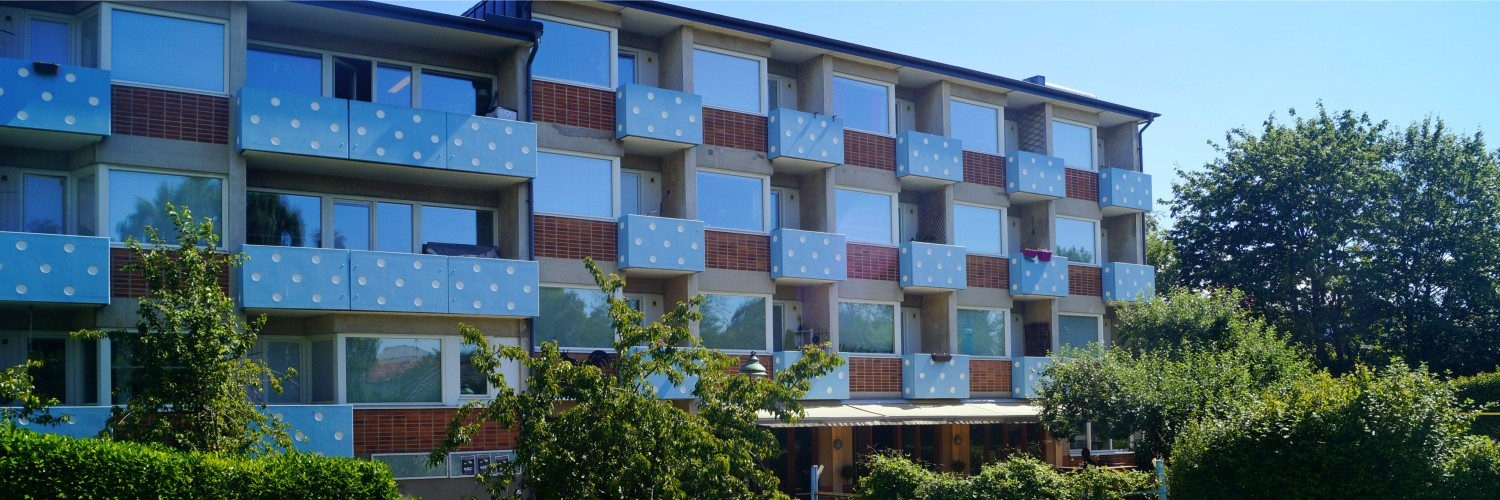
- Location: Tornavägen 7, Lund, Sweden
- Abbreviation: KR
- Nickname: Krischan
- Motto: Där solen alltid skiner
- Motto in English: Where the sun always shines
- Founded: 1890
- Namesake: Kristianstad, Skåne, Sweden
- Inspektor: Charlotta Johnsson
- Membership: 644 (2026)
- Website: https://www.krnation.se/

Kristianstads nation, colloquially known as Krischan, is one of thirteen student nations of Lund University in Sweden. It has 644 members and is thus the eleventh-largest student nation in Lund - ranking behind Sydskånska nationen but ahead of Wermlands.

== History ==
Kristianstads nation started as a split off from the Scanian Nation (Skånska nationen). As that nation grew, it was deemed necessary to, in 1890 split it in five parts: Lunds Nation, Malmö Nation, Helsingkrona Nation, Sydskånska Nationen (originally Ystads Nation) and Kristianstads Nation. As geographic heritage became less associated with membership in a respective nation, Kristianstads developed into resembling its contemporary form.

== Housing ==
The nation offers dorm housing in its main building, known as Snapphanegården. It was erected in 1957, and is a recognizable part of the cityscape of Lund, owing to its iconic light blue spotted balconies, as well as the beach volleyball court visible from the front of the building. The bottom floor is mostly occupied by the nation's pub space as well as nation office spaces.

== Activities ==
Kristianstads nation has a branding focused on a relaxed and easy going vibe. As part of this, they are the only nation with licensed sports televising rights, and host two sports bars. The first, known a Pit Stop shows F1 races, and the second, Bänken (The bench) shows football matches. In keeping with this tradition, Kristianstads Nation regularly hosts sporting events, most notably a beach volleyball tournament that has become a recognizable part of the nation due to the beach volleyball court in front of the Nation's main building.

Another important symbol of Kristianstads Nation is beer. The nation sells its own branded beer, and hosts a beer expo where local brewing companies can market their beer and students get to try a diverse collection of beer for cheaper than by conventional means.

Their spex, known as Krischanstaspääxet (Note: The idiosyncratic spelling of the name is meant to be reminiscent of the Kristianstad dialect.) is a large-scale nation spex comedic theatre, first held in 1985. It puts on shows three times a year, twice in the nation premises and once, in the summer, at Kristianstads city theater.

== Symbols and culture ==
Crest of Kristianstad city, on which the nation's logotype is based, featuring the C4 monogram.

The nation's iconography makes tongue-in-cheek reference to a group of 17th century pro-Danish Scanian partisan, known as Snapphane, who were historically active in the Kristianstad area. The Danish heritage of the region is also visible in the nation crest, featuring a monogram with the characters C4. This refers to the Danish king Kristian IV of Denmark, who periodically ruled parts or all of Scania. In addition to Snapphane, the members are also occasionally known as Göingar, meaning a person from the loosely defined area of Göinge, near the city of Kristianstad.
