= Hans Westman =

Swedish architect

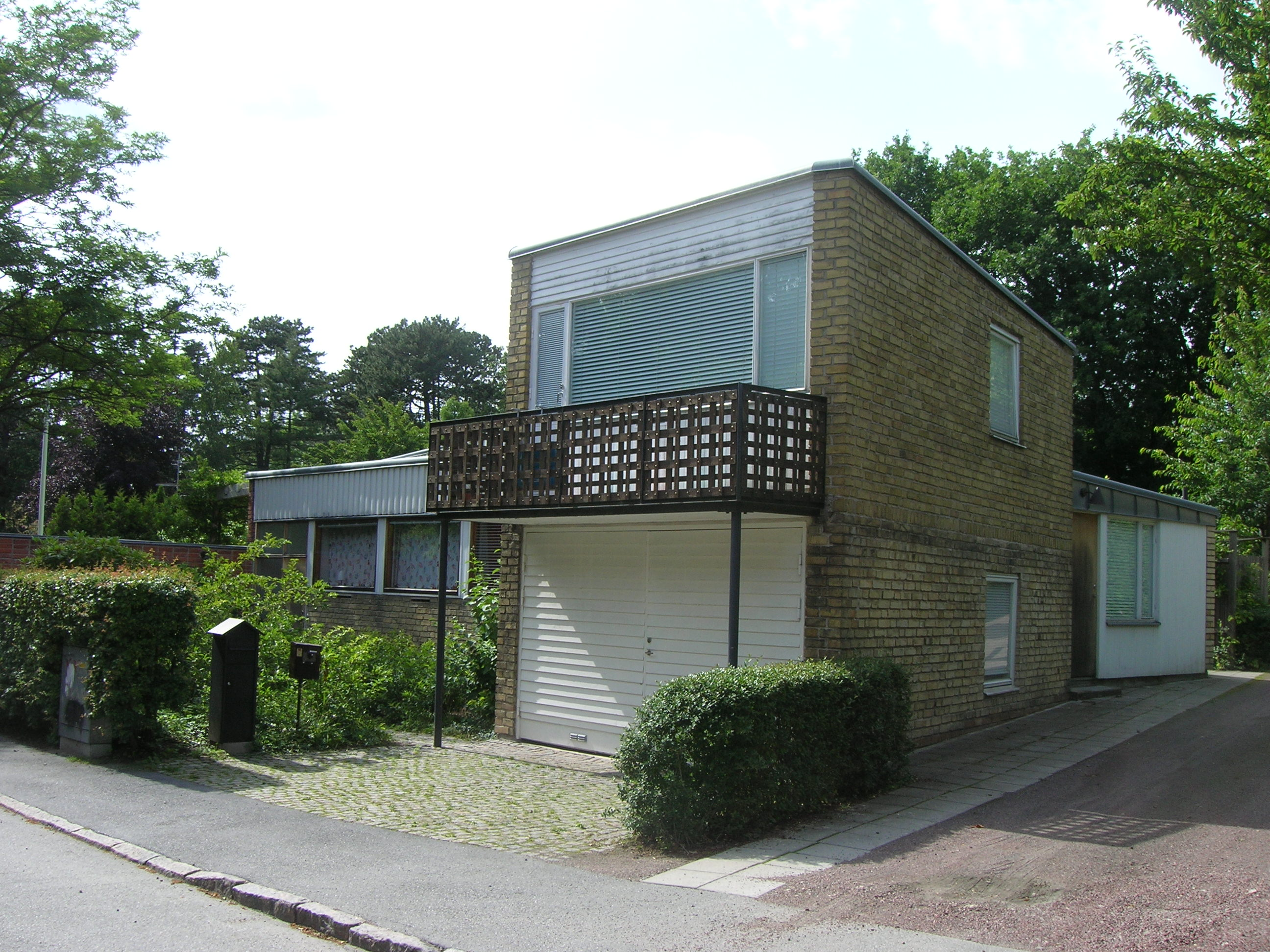
Westmans villa in Lund

Hans Gustaf Westman (9 March 1905 – 17 November 1991) was a Swedish architect

== Biography ==
Westman was born in the parish of Hökhuvud in Stockholm County, Sweden. He was sent to board at Herlufsholm School in Næstved, Denmark. After graduating from Uppsala University in 1924, Westman graduated from the KTH Royal Institute of Technology in 1929. He made a study trip to Italy in 1929 and with a scholarship from KTH traveled to Italy and Germany in 1935.

Westman practised as an architect from 1932 until 1983 and was mainly active in Scania. He had his own architectural firm in Malmö in 1936–38 and then in Lund. In Westmans villa, built in 1939–1940, Westman combines the modernism of the time with his own, novel thoughts. In addition to housing for his family, it was also furnished to the architect's own office.

His works united regional cultural tradition with functionalism, attempting to create a new, Westmannian regional architecture instead of recreating old models. At the same time, Westman resented functionalists' neglect of the human factor that manifested itself in large-scale buildings with routinely applied monotonous patterns. His critique became a driving force for a humanistic development in architecture of Lund.

== Buildings ==
Stockholm:

- Expansion of Saint Eric's Cathedral, Stockholm (1983)

Malmö:

- Bylgiahuset
- Mellanhedsskolan

Linköping:

- Sporthallen (1956)
- Simhallen (1965)

Lund:

- Tingshuset
- Polishuset
- Linnéstaden (1945-1948)
- Tomegapsgatan 13 och 15 (1951)
- Kalmargården (Kalmar Nation) (1952)
- Göteborgs Nation "Kållehus" (1951)
- Studentlyckan (1958)
- Parentheses (1962)
- Ulrikedal (1963)
- Malmö Nation (1964)
- Delphi (1964-1967)
- Fyrklöverhuset (Delphi, Kämnärsvägen, Gylleholmsvägen)
- Lunds Badhus (1938, demolished 1978)
- Idrottshallen I Lund (1941)
- Villa Westman (1939)
