= Smålands Nation, Lund =

Student nation at Lund University

Coordinates: 55°41′52.3″N 13°11′55″E

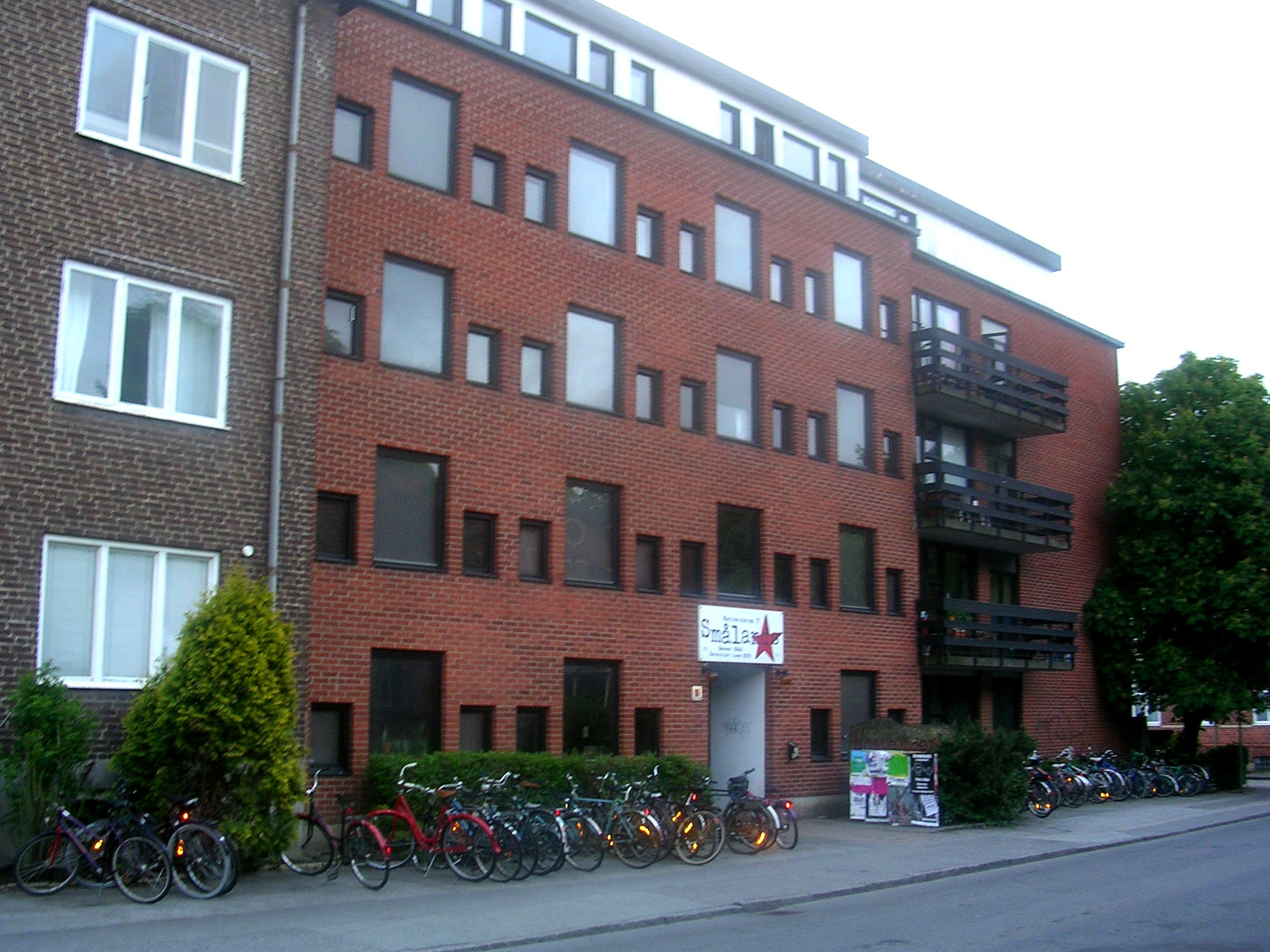
Office and housing

Smålands nation is one of thirteen student nations of Lund University in Sweden. In 2025, it was the twelfth-largest nation in Lund, with 715 members, ranking behind Kristianstads, but ahead of Wermlands Nation.

Founded in 1668, the nation originally served students from the historical province of Småland. It was one of the first nations formed after the foundation of the university, but has periodically been merged with other smaller nations due to low membership counts.

Smålands Nation is distinguished among Lund's nations as it is the only politically aligned nation, becoming officially socialist in 1972. It is due to its political nature that it is the only nation without membership in the various student bodies linking the other twelve nations together, such as the Academic Association and Kuratorskollegiet.

The pub is open on Wednesdays and live bands often perform on Fridays. Clubs are held on Saturdays and feature a variety of music.
