= Lunds Nation =

Student society in Lund, Sweden

Coordinates: 55°42′12.85″N 13°11′59.58″E

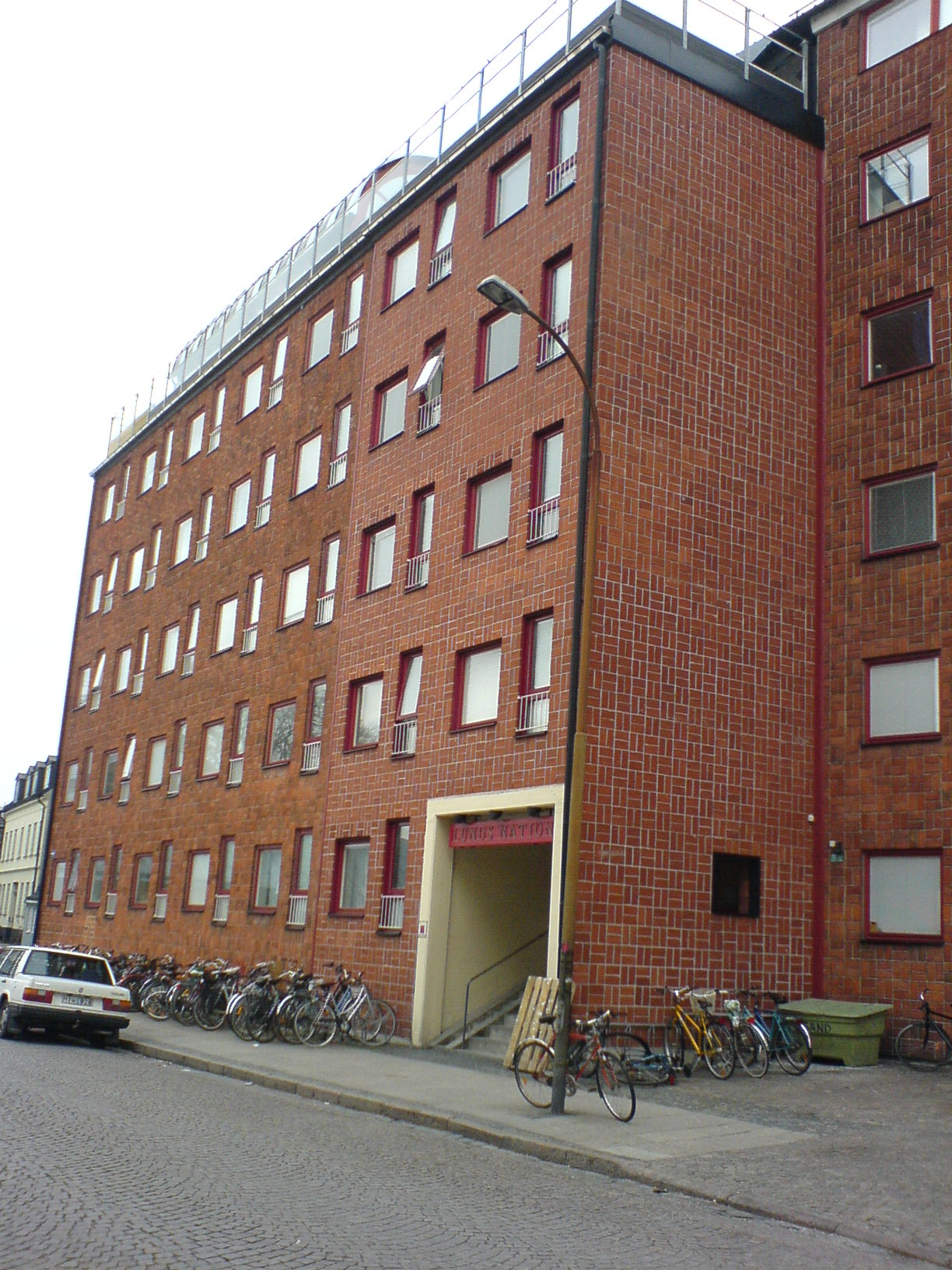
- The "Gamla Huset" entrance to the nation complex, on Agahrdsgatan.
- Abbreviation: LD
- Nickname: "Lunds"
- Named after: Lund, Sweden
- Predecessor: Skånska nationen
- Formation: 1890
- Type: Student nation
- Headquarters: Agahrdsgatan 1, Lund
- Members: 3,862 (2025)
- Inspektor: Kalle Åström
- Website: https://lundsnation.com

Lunds nation is one of thirteen student nations at Lund University, Sweden. With 4,783 members (Spring 2026), it is the largest nation in Lund, followed by Göteborgs and Helsingkrona Nation.

== History ==
The nation traces its origins to one of the university's first nations, Skånska Nationen—named after, and originally composed of students from Scania—which existed from the late 1600s until 1833. Due to its size, Skånska Nationen split into multiple chapters. In 1889, five of these chapters were reformed as independent nations, dissolving Skånska Nationen. On 1 January 1890, the nations known today as Lunds, Malmö, Sydskånska, Kristianstad, and Helsingkrona Nation were established.

During its first semester, Lunds had 67 members.

== Housing ==
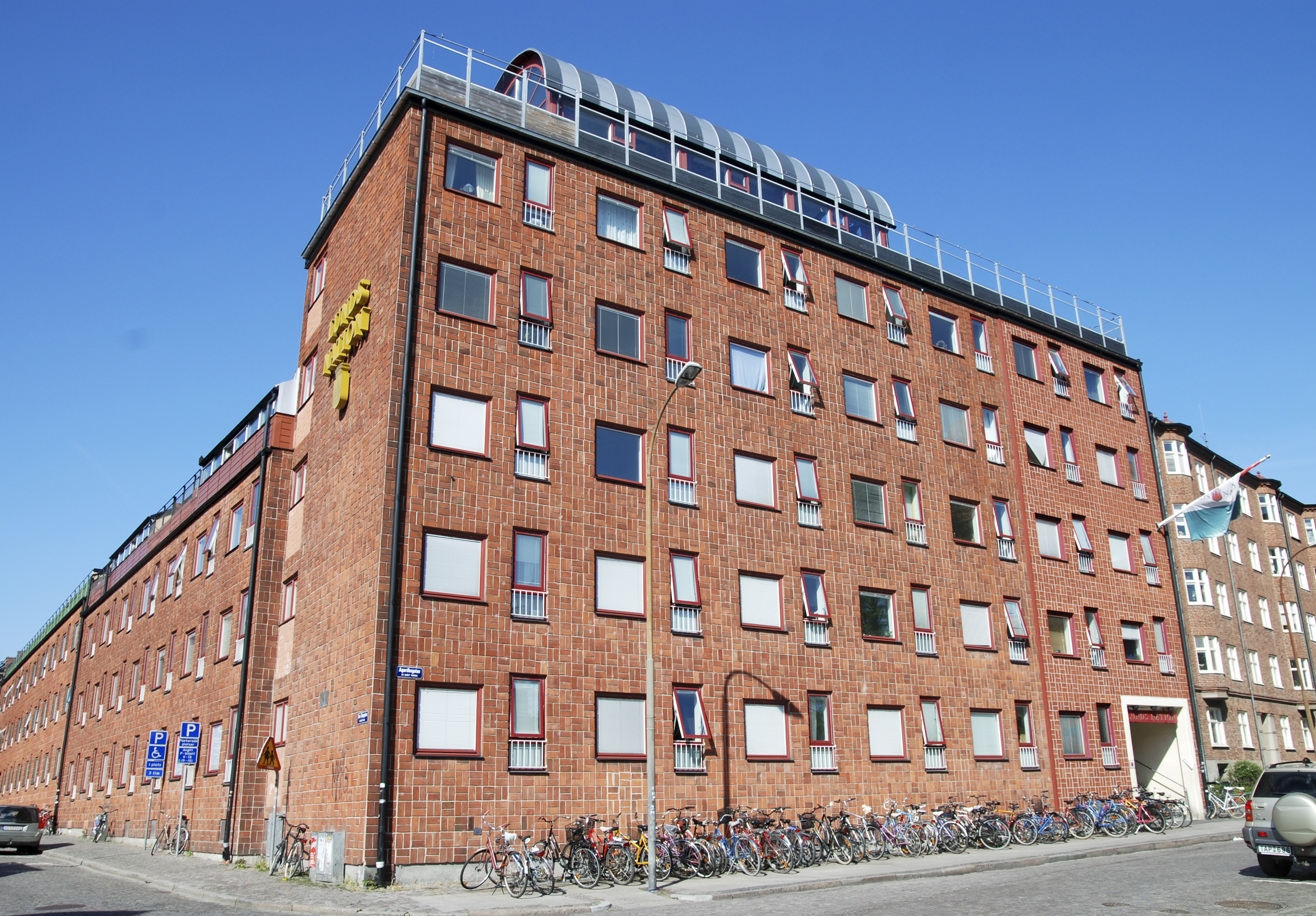
"Nationshuset" - Lunds Nation's housing estate and headquarters in Lund, Sweden. From the left: Nya huset on Stora Tomegatan, followed by Gamla huset on Agahrdsgatan.

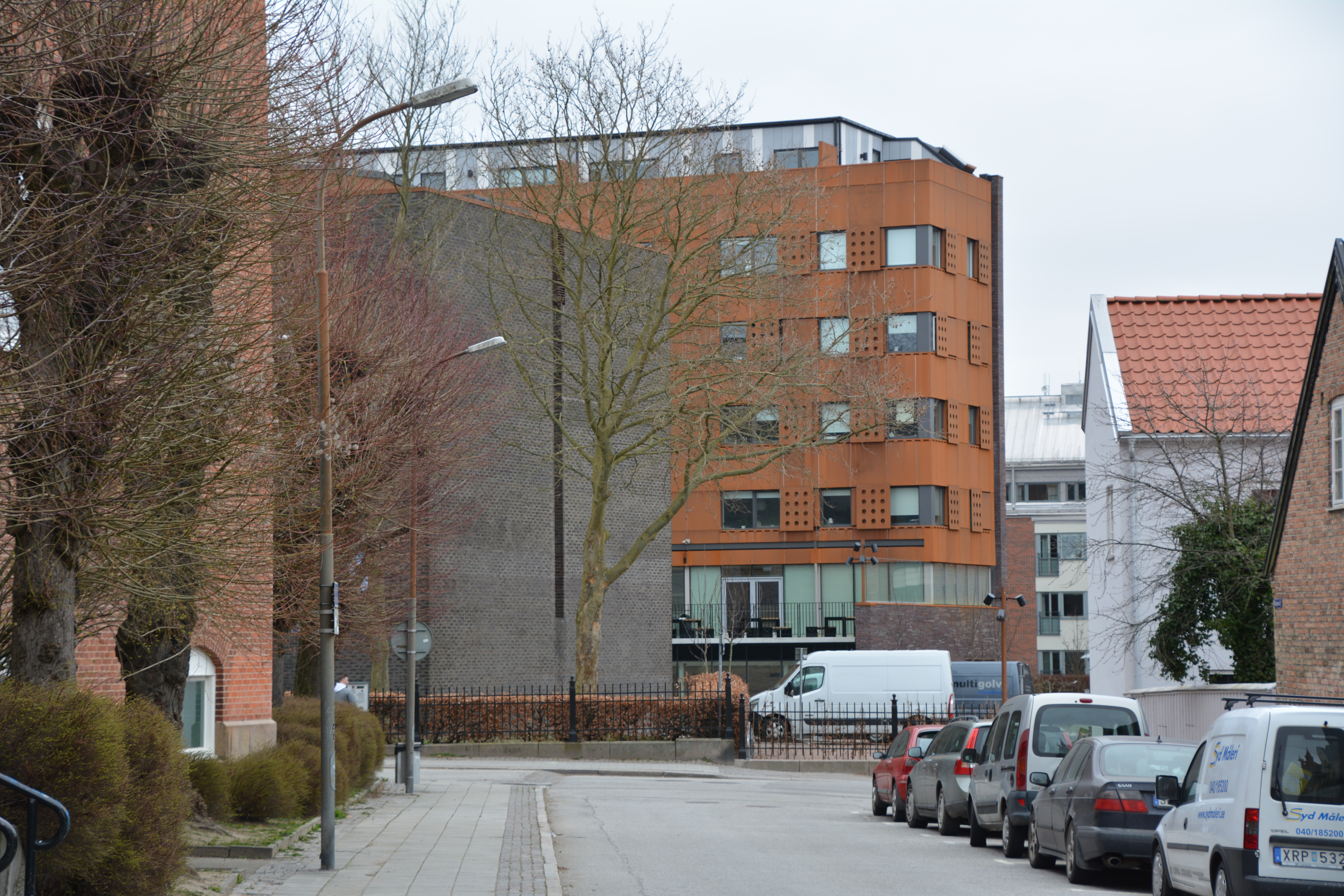
Arkivet, Lunds' second housing estate on Arkivgatan.

=== The Nation House ===
Nationshuset ("The Nation House") was inaugurated in 1959 and consists of Gamla Huset and Nya Huset ("the Old House" and "the New House"). The expansion, Nya Huset, was built in 1967. The building houses Lunds' headquarters and main housing estate. It is located on Agahrdsgatan, at the southwestern corner of the block between the Botanical Garden and Stora Tomegatan. Alongside 140 apartments, Lunds' headquarters and basement are located here, with the basement serving as the main venue for the nation's social activities. The building features a spacious courtyard where a new housing development was planned for completion by 2023. This new four-story building is designed to include 14 shared apartments and two one-room apartments. It will be attached to Nya Huset, which will also be expanded with additional dorm rooms in its current attic space.

=== The Archive ===
Another housing estate of Lunds Nation is Arkivet ("The Archive"), located on Arkivgatan, just north of Ulrikedal. Built in 2014, it contains multiple apartments.

== Events ==
The nation's basement and rooftop bar serve as popular night club venues for students. Lunds nation also regularly hosts brunches, lunches, and semi-formal "sittning" dinners.
