= Västgöta nation =

Västgöta Nation may refer to one of the two following Swedish student nations:

- Västgöta Nation, Lund
- Västgöta Nation, Uppsala
