= Kalmar Nation =

Kalmar Nation may refer to one of the two following Swedish student nations:

- Kalmar Nation, Lund
- Kalmar nation, Uppsala
