= List of Lund University nations =

This is a list of student nations at Lund University in Sweden. The tradition of nations at the university is practically as old as the university itself.

The list is by default sorted in accordance with a time-honoured order based on the age of the diocese of the area that the nation was named after. The reason for this was that almost all students earlier came from gymnasiums, and these were only found in diocesan capitals.

== Active nations ==
Nation	Foundation year	Inspektor	Acronym	Membership (Spring 2026) (Note: Any change in membership numbers is compared to one calendar year before, as Nations tend to have fewer members in the Spring semester than in the Fall semester.)
Östgöta Nation	1668	Carl-Henric Nilsson	ÖG	2130 ▲
Västgöta Nation	1669	Hans Albin Larsson	VG	2279 ▼
Smålands Nation	1668	Pernille Gooch	SM	(no public numbers)
Lunds Nation	1890	Stefan Sveningsson	LD	4783 ▲
Malmö Nation	1890	Annika Björkdahl	ML	3078 ▼
Helsingborgs-Landskrona Nation	1890	Elsa Trolle Önnerfors	HB	3728 ▼
Sydskånska Nationen	1890	Torbjörn Forslid	SSK	881 ▼
Kristianstads Nation	1890	Charlotta Johnsson	KR	644 ▲
Blekingska Nationen	1697	Jonas Åkeson	BL	1152 ▲
Göteborgs Nation	1682	Per Alm	GB	4240 ▼
Hallands Nation	1928	Johan Stenström	HL	1133 ▼
Kalmar Nation	1696	Magnus Sandberg	KM	2036 ▲
Wermlands Nation	1682	Emily Boyd	WL	592 ▲

12 of the 13 nations (Smålands Nation being the exception) have established a cooperation, including being members of the Academic Society (Akademiska Föreningen).

== Former nations ==
- Skånska Nationen (circa 1674–1889) Originally, all Scanian people enrolled in Skånska nationen. However, due to growth of the University the nation was dissolved in 1890 into five parts: Lunds Nation, Malmö Nation, Helsingkrona Nation, Ystad Nation (later Sydskånska Nationen) and Kristianstad Nation.
- Götiska Nationen (a merge of the nations of Östgöta, Västgöta and Kalmar 1766–1798, and then by the nations of Västgöta and Kalmar 1798–1817. After 1871, only Västgöta Nation used the name)
- Norrlands Nation (circa 1803–1842)
- Södermanlands Nation (1838–1847)

== See also ==
- Nations at Swedish universities
