= Blekingska Nationen =

Student nation at Lund University, Sweden

Blekingska nationen
- Student nation
- Lund University
- Location: Ole Römers väg 14D, Lund, Sweden
- Abbreviation: BL
- Founded: 1697
- Namesake: Blekinge, Sweden
- Inspektor: Jonas Åkeson
- Membership: 1,152 (Spring 2026)
- Website: https://www.blekingska.se/

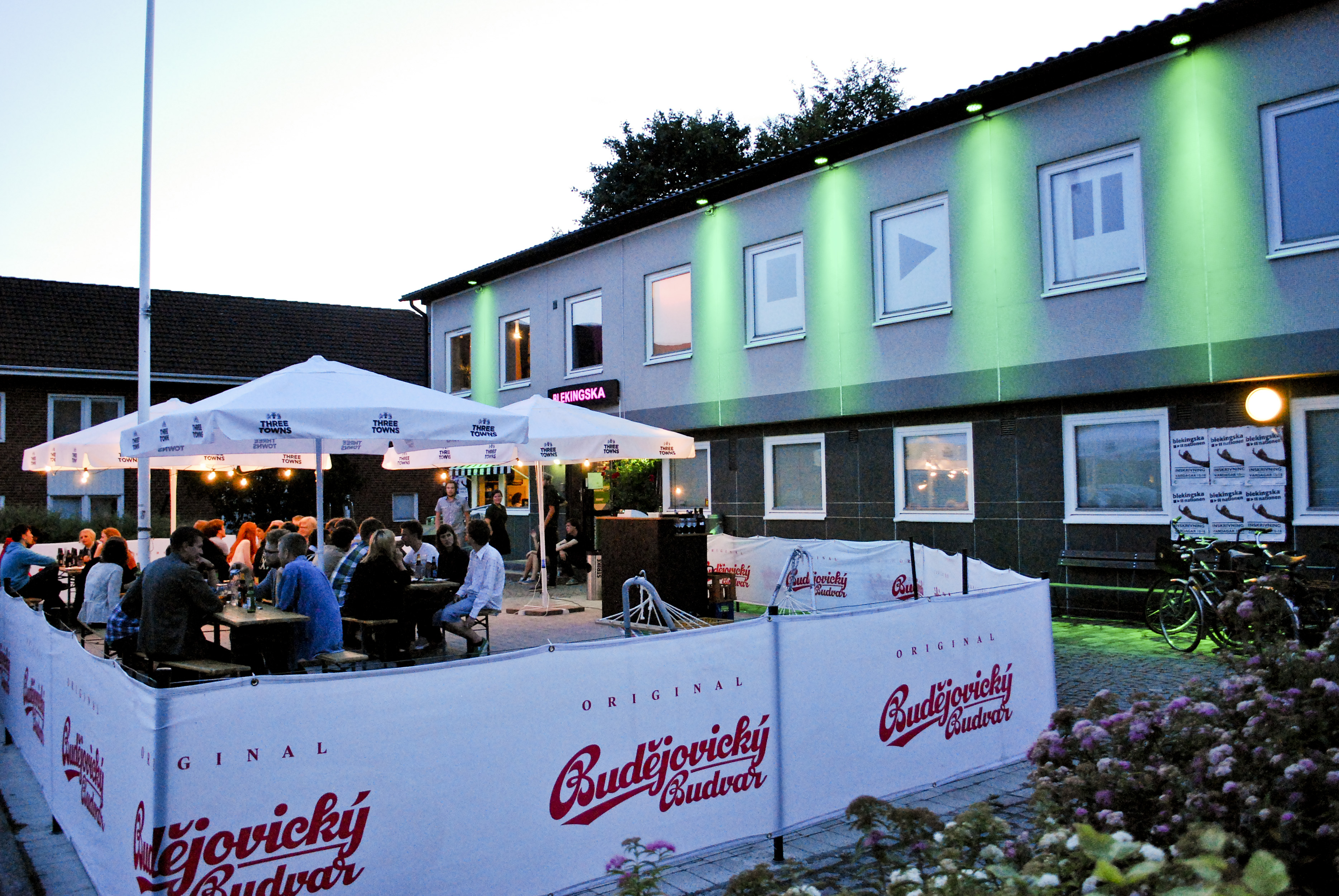
Blekingska nationen.

Blekingska Nationen is one of thirteen student nations of Lund University in Sweden. It has 1,152 members and is thus the eighth-largest student nation in Lund - ranking behind Kalmar Nation but ahead of Hallands.

The nation was founded in 1697. Today, it is one of thirteen student nations concentrating on musical activities at Lund University in Sweden. Its emphasis is on alternative music, and several well-known bands have performed on their stage. These include The Cardigans, Alphaville, bob hund, The Soundtrack of Our Lives, Broder Daniel, The Ark, The Hives, Spearmint, Bad Cash Quartet, Jens Lekman, Ballboy, My Favorite, The Radio Dept., The Hidden Cameras, The Knife and Moneybrother.

Blekingska Nationen's Friday club, Indigo, celebrated its tenth anniversary in 2004, which has carried the organisation forwards. Before the club was founded in 1994, the organisation had only 500 members. At the tenth anniversary of the club, this number had grown to 2000.

== Move ==
Plans for the nation to move were announced in 2016, citing needs of having purpose-built facilities for the nation's activities and music performances in particular. In 2018, Blekingska sold their first property on Måsvägen in western Lund where the nation had been housed since the 1960s. Construction on their new estate in the Ideon area in north-east Lund started in 2019, after 60 million SEK had been accrued through donations and the sale of the old property. Later in the year, an additional 10 million SEK for the construction were donated by Ingvar Backhamre. The two new nation houses were inaugurated in 2022 and has 162 apartments.
