= Wermlands Nation =

Student nation of Lund University

- Student nation
- Lund University
- Location: Stora Tvärgatan 13, Lund, Sweden
- Latin name: Natio Wermelandica
- Abbreviation: WL
- Motto: Kom in i Wermen
- Motto in English: Come into the warmth!
- Founded: 1682
- Named for: Värmland, Sweden
- Inspektor: Sven Lidin
- Membership: 592 (2026)

Wermlands Nation is one of thirteen student nations of Lund University in Sweden. It has 592 members and is thus the smallest student nation in Lund.

== History ==
One of the oldest nations in Lund, Wermlands was founded in 1682 with the intention of uniting students from the Värmland region. It had four registered students at the time. Its first Inspektor, Johannes Eric Ahlström, was a professor of Roman poetry and rhetoric.

In 1947, Wermlands built their first nation house in its current place, on Stora Tvärgatan 13. An extension wing was added to the house's west side by 1959. Around the same time, work started on a joint housing estate together with Kalmar Nation and Blekingska Nationen on Måsvägen in western Lund. Wermlands' part of this estate has since been sold.

In 2021, Emily Boyd, head of the university's Centre for Sustainability Studies, was installed as the nation's Inspektrix. She succeeded Inspektor Pär Omling, who was installed in 2009.

== Notable members ==
Tage Erlander, who would later become Prime Minister of Sweden, served as a member of the nation's board and as Kurator (head executive) in 1922. He was a founding member of Kuratorskollegiet (KK) - the umbrella organization for Lund's student nations.

== Awards ==
Cited as a "pioneer within sustainable student life", the nation was awarded a stipend by the Skåne regional government in 2018 for its work towards environmental awareness within the organization.

== Controversies ==
=== Embezzlement scandal ===
In late 2023, a former Prokurator Ekonomi (PQE), the nation equivalent of a treasurer, was convicted of gross breach of trust after embezzling 314,000 SEK (approx. €30,000) over a period of 14 months. After a successor had discovered unusual purchases as part of the nation's bookkeeping, authorities were alerted. The former treasurer, a 30-year-old woman, was arrested in April 2023 at Stockholm Arlanda Airport as she was about to leave the country. After a search of her apartment, expensive clothing items and accessories were found. She admitted to having done personal shopping using the nation's credit card with the intent of paying back the funds once able.

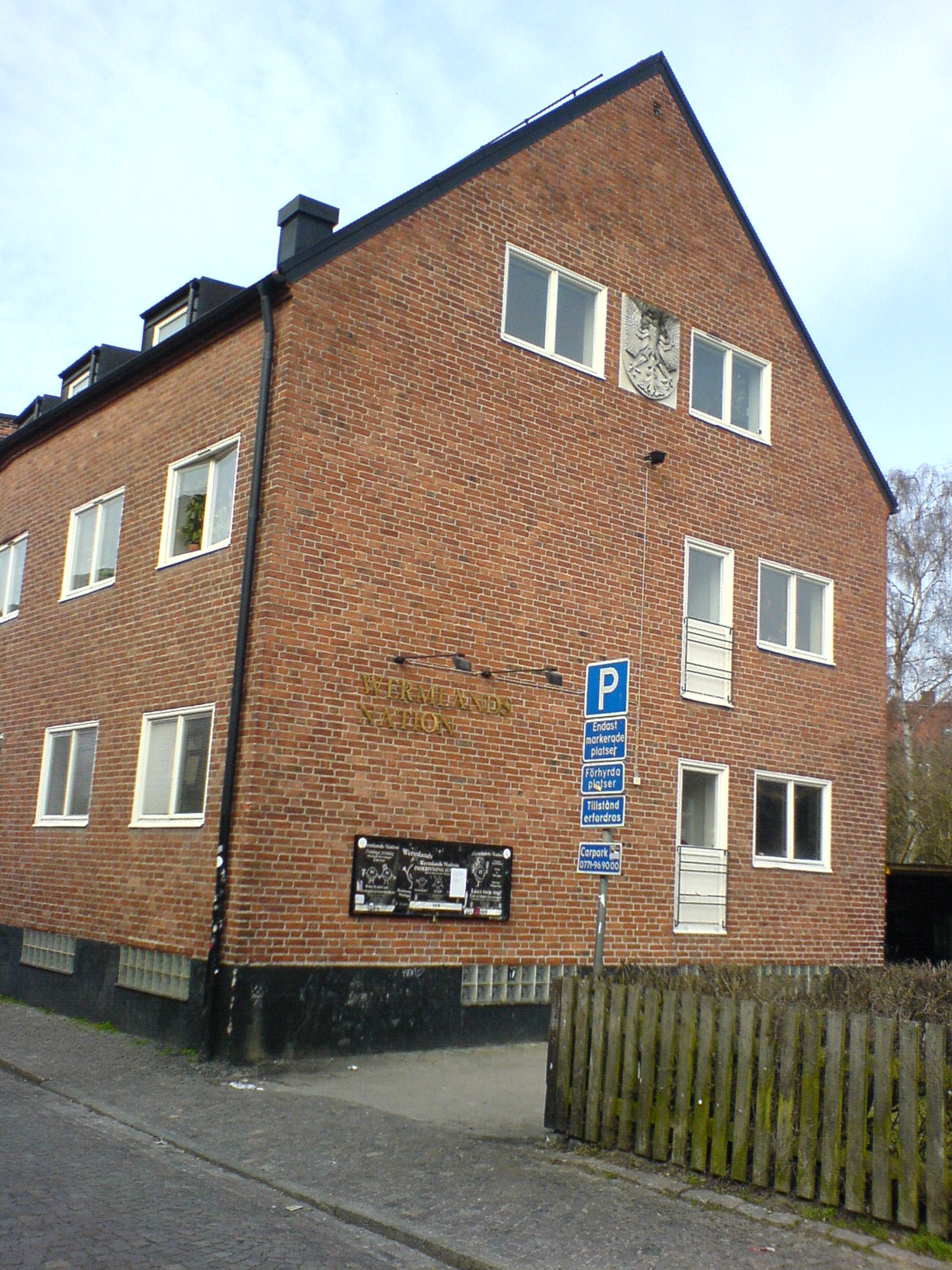
The nation's house in central Lund

As part of the criminal investigation against the former treasurer, it was revealed that the nation had been paying her in the form of a stipend of 132,000 SEK over a period of 12 months. The payments - which had allegedly been approved by the nation's board and Proinspektor Martin C.E Asker - were not reported as salary payments with the Tax Agency, and as such the nation avoided paying over 200,000 SEK in taxes through this disallowed practice. A reason attributed to this form of payment was that the convicted treasurer was a foreign citizen without a work permit, which meant that she had not been allowed to receive a salary while residing in Sweden.

=== Breach of alcohol serving regulations ===
As a consequence of "financial misconduct" - due in part to the convicted former treasurer's illicit compensation - Wermlands Nation received a formal warning by the municipal alcohol licensing authority in June 2024. Another reason given was that a person in charge of serving during an official inspection was not deemed suitable to be responsible, as the person could not identify what certain containers in the serving area contained, nor what their duties as serving-responsible entailed.
