= Västgöta Nation, Lund =

Student society in Lund, Sweden

Coordinates: 55°42′20″N 13°12′37″E

- Abbreviation: VG
- Nickname: VG:s
- Named after: Västergötland, Sweden
- Formation: 1669
- Type: Student nation
- Headquarters: Tornavägen 17-19, Lund
- Members: 2,279 (2026)
- Inspektor: Hans Albin Larsson
- Website: https://vgnation.se

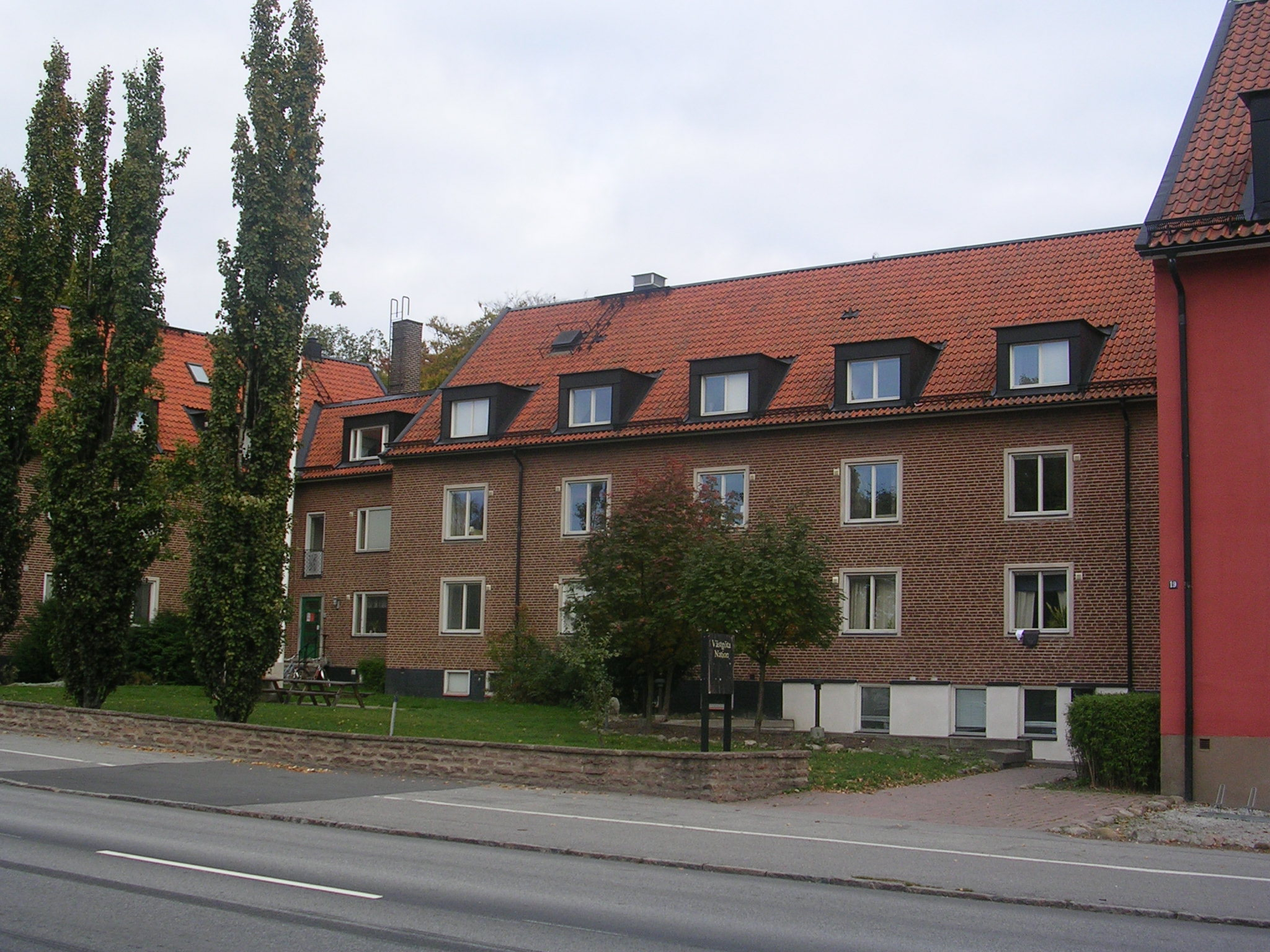
Västgöta Nation at Tornavägen in Lund.

Coat of Arms

The Västgöta Nation, colloquially known as VG's, is one of thirteen student nations at Lund University in Sweden. With its 2,279 members, it is the fifth-largest nation in Lund - ranking behind Malmö but ahead of Östgöta Nation.

== History ==
The nation traces its history to 28 January 1669, exactly one year after the founding of Lund University.

Due to the Scanian War from 1675 to 1679, the university's and the nation's activities were halted until 1685 for the nation's part. Since 1685, its traditions have followed an unbroken succession, although it merged with Östgöta Nation and Kalmar Nation as the united Götiska Nationen ("the Gothic Nation"), between 1767 and 1821 as a result of low student numbers at the university.

Since its founding, the purpose of the nation was to offer social support and a meeting place for students who came from Västergötland. Membership numbers remained low, however, hovering around only 20-30 students up until the 1900s. During its first centuries of existence the nation had no house of its own. The primary meeting spot tended to be the home of the Inspektor. The founding of the Academic Society in the mid-1800s allowed for the nation to operate out of the society's Castle.

Around a hundred years later, during a looming shortage of student housing, plans for a Västgöta nation house were put into motion, with Västgötagården being inaugurated in 1954. Sports, culture and dance parties were the core tenets of the nation's activities. By the 1990s, the nation had around 500 members.

With student union and nation membership for students in Lund and Uppsala becoming voluntary in 2010, all nations had to reorganize their activities to attract students. On Västgöta's part, food and cooking was made the nation's staple along with its Metro nightclub.

The nation is commonly referred to as a restaurant and bar, as well as a nightclub; it is one of many venues to host "sittnings" (formal dinners) and events.
