= Malmö Nation =

Student society in Lund, Sweden

Malmö nation
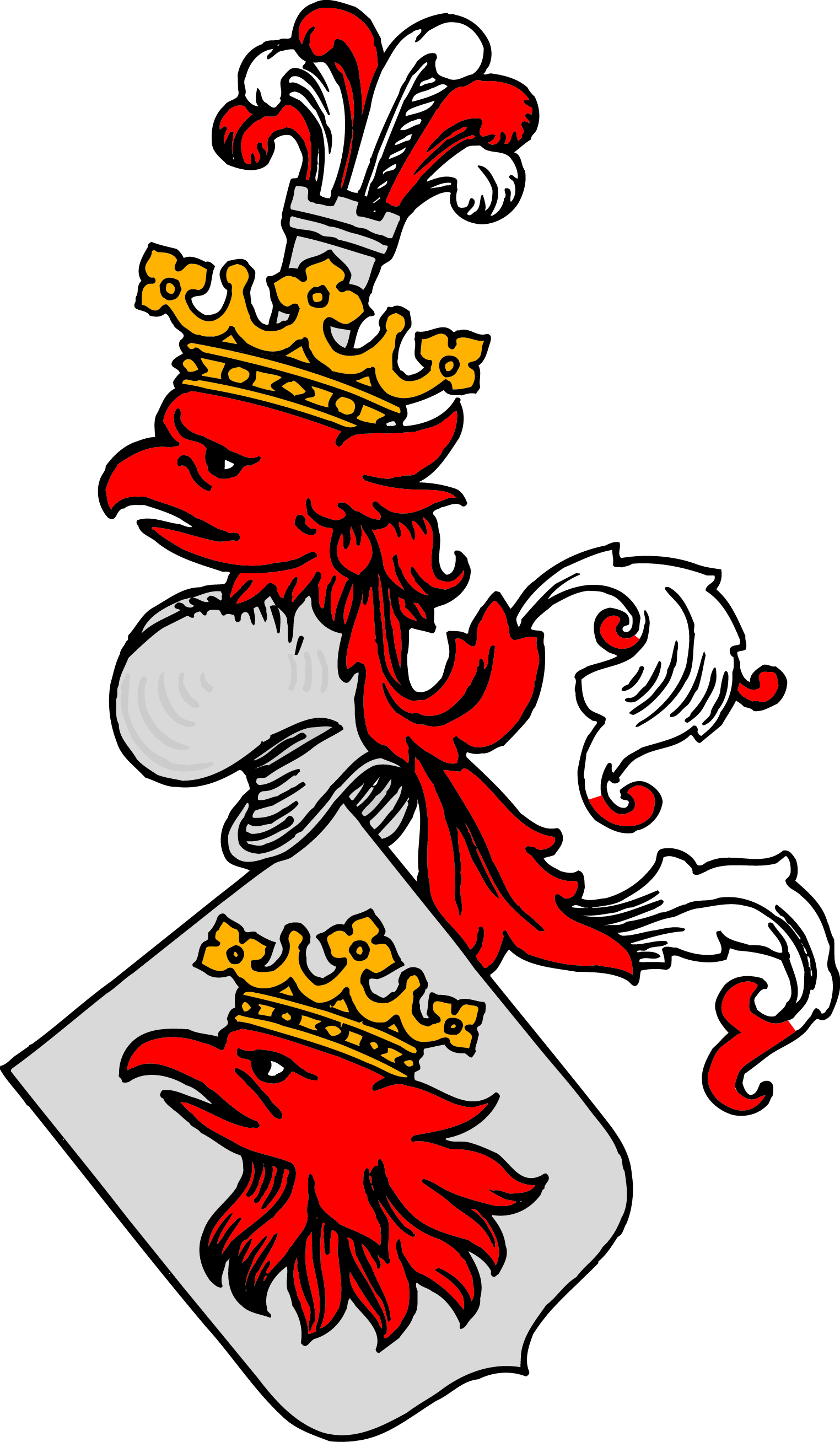
- Abbreviation: ML
- Named after: Malmö, Sweden
- Predecessor: Skånska Nationen
- Formation: 1890
- Type: Student nation
- Headquarters: Östra Vallgatan 51, Lund, Sweden
- Members: 3,078 (2026)
- Inspektor: Annika Björkdahl
- Website: https://malmonation.com

Malmö nation is one of thirteen student nations of Lund University in Sweden. With its 3,078 members, it is the fourth-largest nation in Lund - ranking behind Helsingkrona but ahead of Västgöta Nation.

The nation is notable for arranging its own carnival that runs parallel to the Lund Carnival every four years.

== History ==
The nation has its origins in one of the university's first nations, Skånska Nationen (named after, and composed of students from Scania) which existed from the late 1600s to 1833, when its size essentially forced the nation to split into multiple chapters. In 1889, it was decided that five of the chapters were to be reformed as Nations in their own right, dissolving Skånska Nationen. Thus, on January 1, 1890, the Nations that are known today by the names of Malmö, Lunds, Sydskånska, Kristianstads and Helsingkrona were formed.

At the nation's 50-year anniversary in 1940, it had 2,378 members. Between 1931 and 1964, the nation was based at Vallgården in Malmö. In 1962, the nation erected the first of its three properties in Lund, at Östra Vallgatan. The two latter properties, the Casa and Middle houses, were finished by 1967. Around the late 1960s, the nations had become a more significant part of students' lives. Malmö nation's first lunch service, Moder Svea, was launched around the same time, serving traditional Swedish husmanskost for 4 crowns. It was also around this time the politicization of the nations started to become palpable.

Lively political debates were common occurrences at Malmö Nation until the mid-1970s. In 1974, Malmö nation elected its first female Kurator, Rita Rohlin. The 1970s saw an increased demand for a relaxed meeting place for students outside of their studies. Festivities were attractive as well and in 1976 the slabb, a regular disco arrangement with significant alcohol consumption was introduced and arranged in Malmö nation's dark basement quarters. The concept was the nation's primary source of income and this lasted well into the 1980s.

The slabb was eventually replaced by the more successful pub Casa Nova, starting in March 1983. In 1987, the Spring Ball, a 1960s traditional ball, was brought back.

== Housing ==
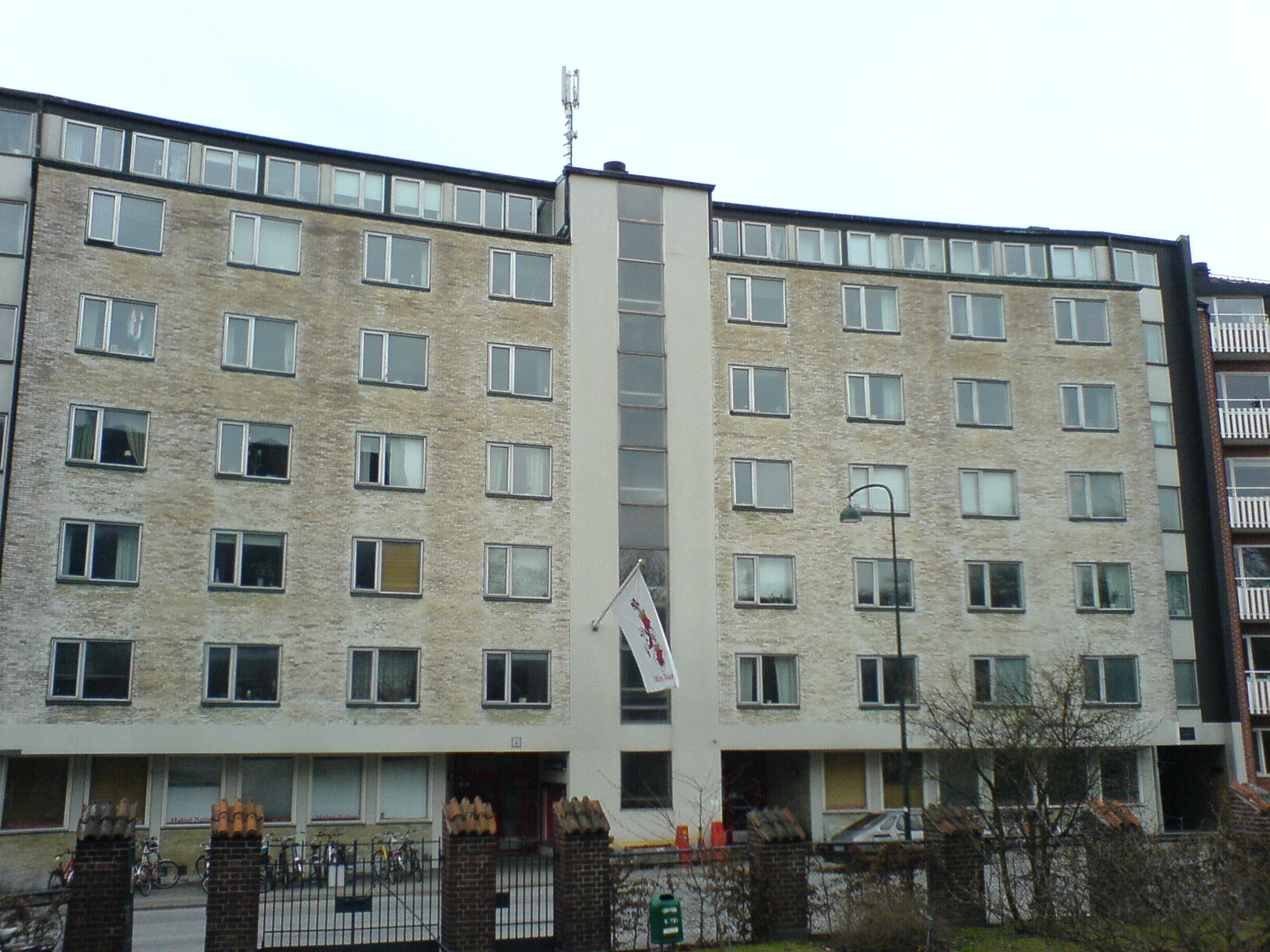
The Malmö nation house

The nation owns four houses (Gamla huset, Mellanhuset, Casanovahuset and Städet) in central Lund which together house around 300 students. Its complex neighbors the Botanical Garden and covers two city blocks, between Stora Tomegatan and Östra Vallgatan. Its oldest house was designed by Hans Westman.

== Controversies ==
Malmö Nation has been the subject of multiple controversies, both in local and national press. In late 2015, the nation was criticized for, in response to alleged threats, the removal of a post from its Facebook page which had been published by two female victims of sexual harassment at one of the nation's club events. Shortly thereafter, the local student newspaper Lundagård reported on the nation's allegedly former tradition of tossing around and killing a live eel at a dinner party event, prompting animal rights group Djurens rätt to publicly accuse the nation of animal cruelty.

The nation has been criticized for not complying with alcohol serving regulations and for operating a suspected illegal night club.

In 2015, leading up to the nation's 125-year anniversary, the nation was sanctioned for gender discrimination in their advertising.

A formal apology was issued by the nation in 2022, following the printing of an official song book containing a drinking song that inferred allegations against "the Chinese" for being responsible for the COVID-19 pandemic. The incident eventually led to an official recall of all 157 song books in circulation.

== Honorary members (selection) ==
The year indicates when the member was made an honorary member.

- Ola Hansson (1910)
- Albert Ulrik Bååth (1911)
- Hans Larsson (1913)
- Anders Österling (1934)
- Per Albin Hansson (1938)
- Hjalmar Gullberg (1940)
- Ingvar Andersson (1945)
- Hans Ruin (1947)
- Gunnar Aspelin (1950)
- Gustav Möller (1950)
- Gösta Ehrensvärd (1965)
- Fritiof Nilsson Piraten
- KG Ossian Nilsson (1965)
- Max-Walter Svanberg (1976
- Dagmar Edqvist (1981)
- Sixten Ehrling (1984)
- Jan Troell (1984)
- Jan Malmsjö (1985)
- Pierre Schori (1990)
- Jacques Werup (1991)
- Ola Billgren (1992)
- Torbjörn Flygt (2012)
- Jonas Hafström (2023)
