= Göteborgs Nation, Lund =

Student society in Lund, Sweden

Göteborgs Nation
- Student nation
- Lund University
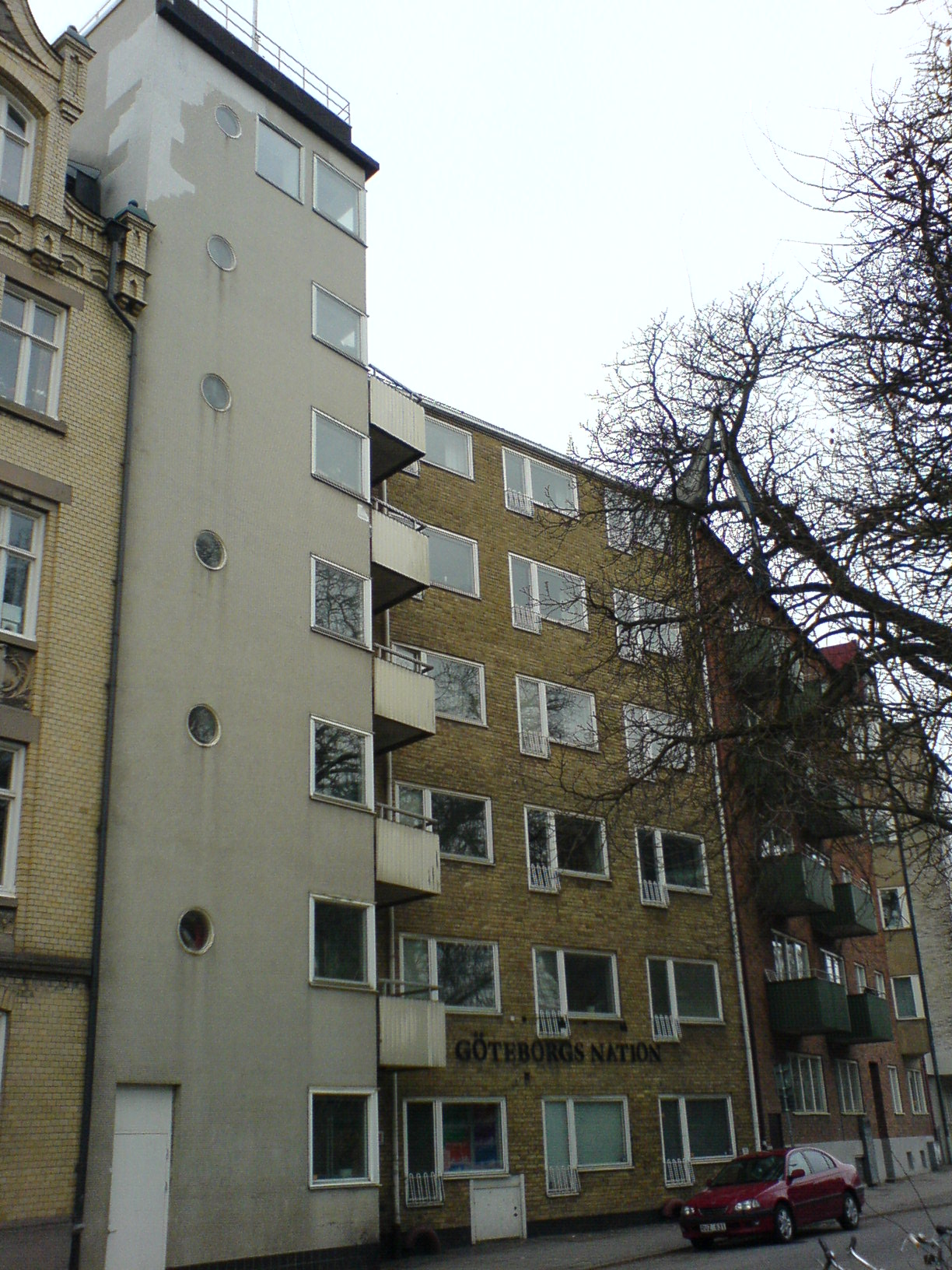
- Göteborg Nation's nation house
- Location: Östra Vallgatan 47, Lund, Sweden
- Latin name: Natio Gothoburgensis
- Abbreviation: GB
- Founded: 1682
- Namesake: Gothenburg, Sweden
- Inspektor: Andreas Ingehammar
- Proinspektor: Monica Larsdotter
- Membership: 4,240 (2026)
- Website: https://goteborgsnation.com

Göteborgs Nation is one of thirteen student nations of Lund University, Sweden. With its 4,240 members, Göteborgs is the second-largest nation in Lund, ranking behind Lunds but ahead of Helsingkrona.

The nation is known for organizing GA-balen ("The GA ball"; named after Swedish King Gustav II Adolf), one of Sweden's largest balls.

== History ==
Göteborgs Nation was founded in 1682, less than two decades after the founding of the university and its first nations.

The nation's member count increased from around 25 members in the 1700s, to 40 members in the 1800s and 88 members by 1901.

By 1952, Göteborgs had constructed its own nation house, Kållehus, with enough rooms to house 47 students. The construction was led by the nation's Inspektor at the time, professor of philosophy Åke Petzäll and his wife Astrid. In 1959, another housing complex was inaugurated, Bohus, which consisted of 13 single-floor homes and one communion house. It could house 18 student families in pairs and 70 students in single rooms. The nation decided to sell these properties in 1980 and today, Kållehus at Östra Vallgatan 47 remains as its nation house and headquarters, along with Kajutan, where a variety of activities take place.

In 1964, the first Gustav II Adolf ball was arranged, which the nation claims to be the second-largest formal-wear ball in the Nordic countries, ranking behind the Nobel Banquet. The ball is held every year in November, to celebrate Gustav II Adolf's founding of the city of Gothenburg.

== Honorary members (selection) ==
- Carl Block
- Olof Sundin
- Carl-Gustaf Andrén (1974)
- Pehr G. Gyllenhammar (1975)
- Bengt E. Y. Svensson (1978)
- Gunnar Bramstång (1981)
- Lars Hjörne (1981)
- Louise Vinge (1981)
- Tomas von Brömssen (1984)
- Sten-Åke Cederhök (1984)
- Sören Mannheimer (1986)
- Viveca Lärn (1995)
- Sture Allén (2004)
- Jan Eliasson (2005)
- Gert Wingårdh (2006)
- Sissela Kyle (2008)
- Lars Eckerdal
- Håkan Westling
- Wilhelm Tham (2018)
