= Hans Ruin =

Finnish philosopher and writer

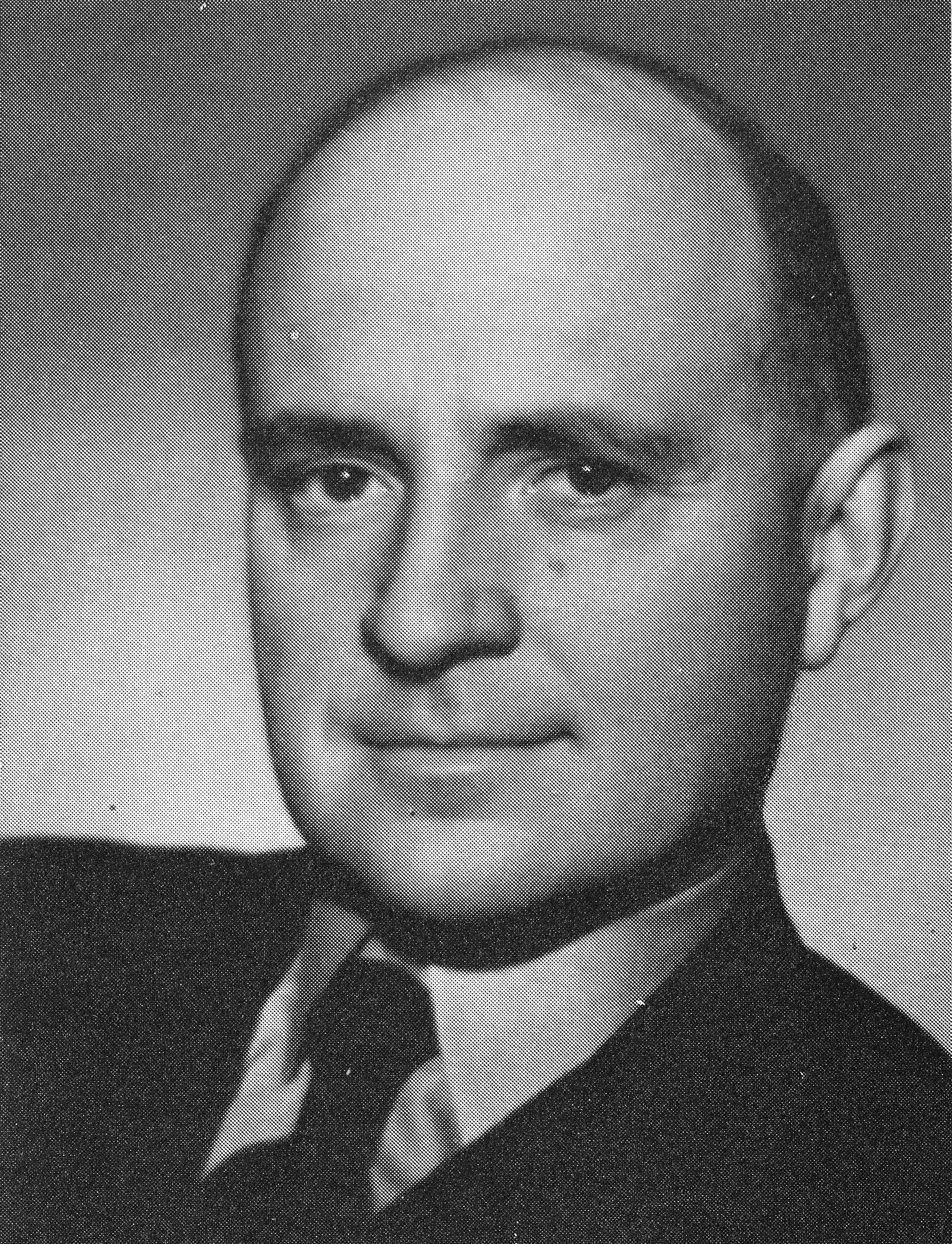
- Hans Ruin
- Born: Hans Waldemar Ruin; 18 June 1891; Helsinki, Grand Duchy of Finland, Russian Empire (now Finland)
- Died: 3 November 1980 (aged 89); Stockholm, Sweden
- Education: Helsinki University Lund University; Åbo Akademi University Stockholm University College
- Occupations: Writer, philosopher, librarian, docent, professor
- Spouses: Karin "Kaisi" Sievers
- Children: Olof; Martina
- Writing career
- Period: 1919–1977
- Subjects: Aesthetics, psychology, literary psychology

Hans Waldemar Ruin (18 June 1891, Helsinki – 3 November 1980, Stockholm) was a Finland-Swedish philosopher and writer. He was professor of philosophy at Åbo Akademi University 1945–1947 and associate professor of aesthetics at Lund University 1947–1952, where he was then research associate professor 1952–1957. He was also associate professor of psychology at the University of Helsinki 1927–1936 and of art and literature psychology 1936–1949.

== Biography ==
Ruin was the son of Professor Waldemar Ruin and Flora Henrika Lindholm. He married Karin "Kaisi" Sievers (1894) in 1917, daughter of physician Richard Sievers and Freifrau Karin von Bonsdorff. He had two children, Martina and Olof, and is maternal grandfather to David and Marika Lagercrantz. His grandchild was also named Hans Ruin and became a philosopher.

Ruin graduated from Nya Svenska Läroverket in 1909. He received his Candidate of Philosophy degree from the University of Helsinki in 1913, followed by his Licentiate in 1921 and Doctor of Philosophy in 1923. His academic dissertation was titled Erlebnis und Wissen. In his dissertation, Ruin was critical of behaviourism, viewing humans as intellectual beings, a conviction he never abandoned.

In 1923 Ruin published the study Nutidskonst i psykologisk belysning, in which he sought the psychological foundations of the transition from Impressionist art to modernist movements and the pursuit of "pure art". This was a theme that would remain central throughout his work. In 1934 he published the essay collection Gycklare och apostlar, in which he addressed the political threats posed by totalitarian ideologies in Europe. In this work he also broke with his earlier inspiration Ludwig Klages, after Klages aligned himself with Nazi ideals, warning that the intuitionistic and vitalistic ideas that had informed his own thinking had on the continent allied themselves with a primitivistic anti-intellectualism hostile to culture.

Ruin's main work, Poesiens mystik (1935), is built on a comparison between the poet's intuitive creative process and the religious mystic's striving for union with the divine. He described poetry as "a religion for those who have no other home on this earth." The work quickly reached a wide audience beyond academia and made a deep impression on many writers in both Finland and Sweden. A second edition with a commentary by the author appeared in 1960, and a new printing followed in 1978 after hermeneutic perspectives had begun to compete with analytical ones in Nordic aesthetics.

He worked as a librarian at the Helsinki University Library from 1912 to 1930. He became a docent of psychology at the University of Helsinki (1927–1936), and later of art and literary psychology (1936–1949). From 1945 to 1947, he also served as professor of philosophy at Åbo Akademi University.

Ruin was a varied writer, who authored works on topics ranging from continental philosophy to art and literature, as well as autobiographical pieces. Analytical philosophy, an increasingly dominating subject within philosophy at the time, felt foreign to him however. This was one of the reasons why he left Finland and moved to Sweden to pursue the study of aesthetics. Subsequently he obtained Swedish citizenship.

His time in Sweden began as a Nordic docent fellow at Stockholm University College (1944–1945) and Lund University (1945–1947). He subsequently became a docent of aesthetics at Lund University from 1947 to 1952, and was a research docent there from 1952 to 1957. Ruin was also active in several cultural organizations. He was a contributor to the journal Nya Argus from 1920 to 1946, chairman of the Finnish PEN club from 1930 to 1931, a board member of the Society of Swedish Writers in Finland(1934–1945), serving as its chairman in 1936 and again from 1944 to 1945. He also served on the board of the Society of Swedish Literature in Finland from 1934 to 1946.

In Sweden, Ruin became one of the most popular public cultural speakers, admired especially in student circles. During 1952–1957 he served as inspector of Malmö nation at Lund University. His essays became increasingly free in form, which, while perhaps academically less valued, was central to his role as an opinion-forming cultural critic with an exceptional ability to articulate aesthetic experience to broad audiences.

Svenska kulturfonden sponsored an award in 2003 called the Hans Ruin essay contest for essay writers. The contest is arranged every three years.

== Awards ==
- Hallberg Prize, 1937
- Society of Swedish Literature in Finland Prize, 1944
- Dobloug Prize, 1957
- Samfundet De Nio's grand prize, 1962
- Sydsvenska Dagbladet's cultural award, 1963
- Falcken Prize, 1970

== Bibliography ==
- Krigets anlete (1919)
- Erlebnis und Wissen. Kritischer Gang durch die englische Psychologie (1921)
- Nutidskonst i psykologisk belysning (1923)
- Själens försvarsproblem (1929)
- Gycklare och apostlar (1934)
- Poesiens mystik (1935)
- Väl mött, Europa! (1938)
- Makt och vanmakt (1940)
- Rummet med de fyra fönstren (1940)
- Ett land stiger fram (1941)
- Det finns ett leende (1943)
- Ibsens förvandling efter "Brand" (1946)
- Arvid Mörne. Liv och diktning (1946)
- Jarl Hemmer. En minnesteckning (1946)
- Finlandssvensk modernism (1947)
- Huru ett land återspeglas i konsten (1947)
- Hur skapar skalderna? (1948)
- Två världar (1948)
- I konstens brännspegel (1949)
- Föränderligt och oföränderligt i de estetiska begreppen (1951)
- Drömskepp i torrdocka (1951)
- Sju ögonblick och några reflexioner (1952)
- Estetisk upplevelse och esteticism (1953)
- Värdighet och behag bland akademiskt folk (1953)
- Yrjö Hirn (1953)
- Den poetiska visionen och verklighetsbilden (1954)
- Nytt och gammalt i ny lyrik (1955)
- Det sjunkna hornet (1956)
- Hem till sommaren (1960)
- Det skönas förvandlingar (1962)
- Avoin ja suljettu käsi (1964)
- Den mångtydiga människan (1966)
- Konsten att läsa och konsten att dikta (1966)
- Världen i min fickspegel (1969)
- Höjder och stup hos Ibsen och några andra (1971)
- Uppbrott och återkomst. Dagboksblad 1933–1973 (1977)

As editor

- Festskrift tillägnad Yrjö Hirn den 7 december 1930 (co-editor with Gunnar Castrén and K.S. Laurila, 1930)
