= Zemlyachestvo =

Type of 19th-century Russian men's society for non-locals

In late 19th century Russia, a zemlyachestvo (Russian: землячество, IPA: [zʲɪˈmlʲæt͡ɕɪstvə]) was a society of men living away from their home regions. Found among students, traveling traders and migrant workers, the zemlyachestvo united those with a common geographical origin when they were far from home.

Zemlyachestvo is defined by Tavadov G.T. in his book Ethnology as 1) a sense of unity among people sharing a homeland they were born in; 2) an association of natives of one locality, region, territory, country; 3) other various forms of association of citizens according to the territorial principle: soldiers and officers serving in one unit, students studying in the same university, etc.

The pre 1860s reform time period can be considered the beginning of community associations in Russia.

The noted Russian revolutionary Vladimir Lenin joined the zemlyachestvo for his home region, Simbirsk, when he was studying at the University of Kazan.

== See also ==
- Nation (university) - a similar organization for non-locals studying in medieval universities in Western Europe
