= Kalmar Nation, Lund =

Student nation in Lund, Sweden

Coordinates: 55°42′23.3″N 13°11′54.5″E

Kalmar Nation
- Student nation
- Lund University
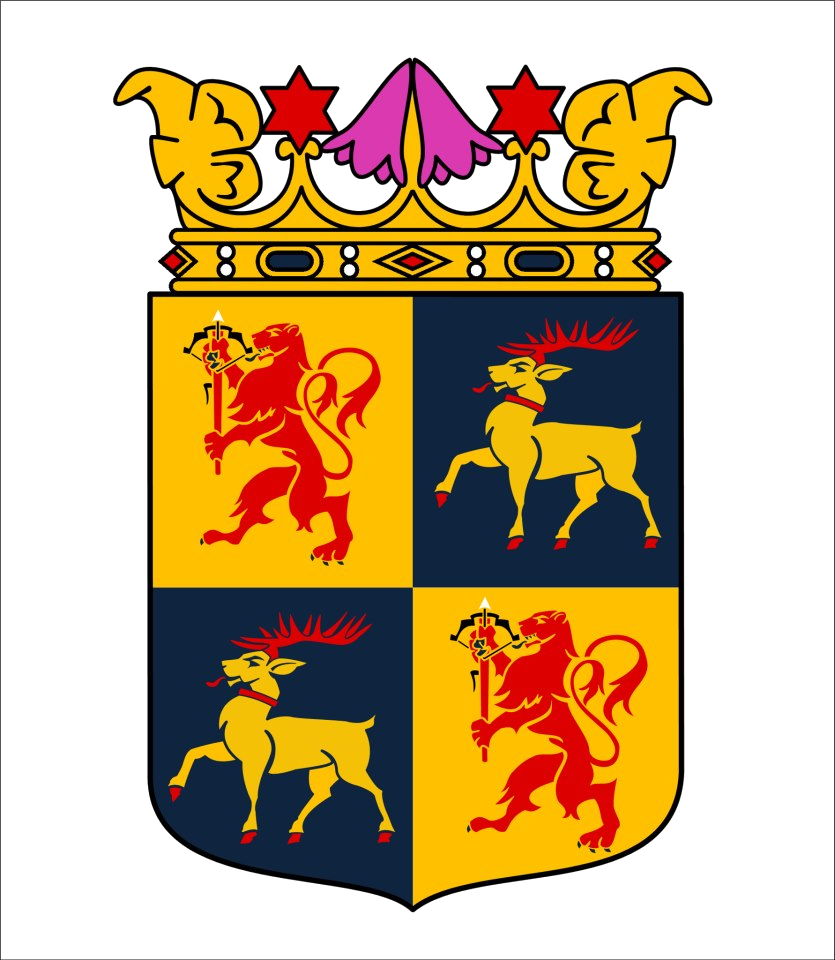
- Location: Biskopsgatan 12, Lund, Sweden
- Full name: Kalmar nation vid Lunds universitet
- Latin name: Natio Calmariensis
- Abbreviation: KM
- Motto: Kom som du är
- Motto in English: Come as you are
- Founded: 1696 (earliest mention)
- Namesake: Kalmar, Sweden
- Inspektor: Magnus Sandberg
- Kurator: Wilma Högberg
- Proinspektors: Per Prené Thomas Ogard Camilla Ländin
- Membership: 2,036 (Spring 2026)
- Website: https://kalmarnation.nu

Kalmar Nation is one of thirteen student nations of Lund University in Sweden. It has 2,036 members and is thus the seventh-largest student nation in Lund - ranking behind Östgöta but ahead of Blekingska.

== History ==
Kalmar Nation was likely founded in 1696. 1767 saw the merging of Kalmar, Östgöta and Västgöta Nations to form Götiska Nationen. In 1817, Kalmar Nation became independent once more.

=== Origins ===
The first mention of Kalmar Nation's existence can be traced to the consistory's (konsistoriet; the name of the Board of Lund University at the time) meeting minutes from February 29th, 1696. In the records, it was noted that "Calmarienses, Junekopienses [Jönköpingites] and those from Visingsö" were to form their own student nation. Until this point, students from the diocese of Kalmar may have been part of Smålands Nation, but with the 1696 decision, they were allowed independence. Erland Lagerlöf, Professor of Roman eloquence, was appointed Kalmar Nation's first Inspektor. Little is known about the nation prior to the creation of its first members registry in 1766. Some documents from 1740 exist, detailing the awarding of stipends to Kalmarites, signed by the nation's Kurator. For most of the first half of the 1700s, it is believed that Kalmarites more often than not fraternized and worked together with members of other nations, such as Smålands, Sörmlands and Wermlands.

=== 1767-1817: Götiska Nationen ===
Due to low membership counts among all student nations during this time, Östgöta, Västgöta and Kalmar nations joined together to form Götiska Nationen in 1767, led by former Västgöta Inspektor Christian Wollin. Götiska Nationen lasted until 1817 when the Kalmar left the cooperation, becoming independent once more. Östgöta had left the Götiska cooperation by 1798 on cordial terms, but when Kalmar now did the same, accusations of having willfully caused division were levied against the newly-elected Kalmar Kurator Lidfors. The final say was held by the consistory, however, and the split was approved. Kalmar took over Götiska's collection of dissertations, while Västgöta was granted the former union's "coffers and all miscellaneous belongings". The new Inspektor Jonas Albin Engeström, who was a physicist, chemist and priest, was elected in April that same year.

=== 19th century ===
The connection between the nations and the university was becoming quite clear around this time. While originally being forbidden by the university authorities in the early days, the nations - and their Inspektors in particular - had become important in maintaining discipline and order among students. In 1813, it became obligatory for most students to join a nation. Kalmar Nation adopted its first statutes in 1818. They stipulated among other things that any candidate for the position of Kurator should be a senior academic, ideally a docent or adjunkt.

All nations were quite hierarchical during this time. In order to advance within the nation, one was expected to pass certain tests. In order to become a "junior", the Inspektor, Kurator and Seniors would test you on subjects from the school curriculum. The practice was abolished in 1830, as being judged by one's peers was ultimately deemed to be against the principle of "academic freedom".

The nations had been housed in the venues of the Academic Society (AF) since the 1830s. On November 27, 1841, however, it was decided that the nation should leave AF and build its own house. A few months later, the decision was reversed. It would take another 110 years for the dream of a nation house to be realized.

The first Storaste Kroppkakan was held on March 2, 1897. It is the oldest student ball in Lund and takes place in the Spring of odd-numbered years.

=== 20th century ===
In 1952, Kalmargården was inaugurated. 1960 saw the inauguration of the nation's second housing estate, Kalmar Västra.

== Housing ==
=== Kalmargården ===
Kalmargården is a house in central Lund, behind Tomegapsgården, where most of the activities around the nation take place. The building was opened in 1952. Already on November 27, 1841, it was decided that Kalmar nation should acquire its own house. To get the money in order to build the house, a lottery was arranged where the highest prize was a car which was donated by a car dealer in Lund. A plot for 35,000 SEK (Approximately 538,000 SEK in 2021) was bought and on March 14, 1952, the foundation was laid for Kalmargården. It was inaugurated on the evening of November 15, 1952.

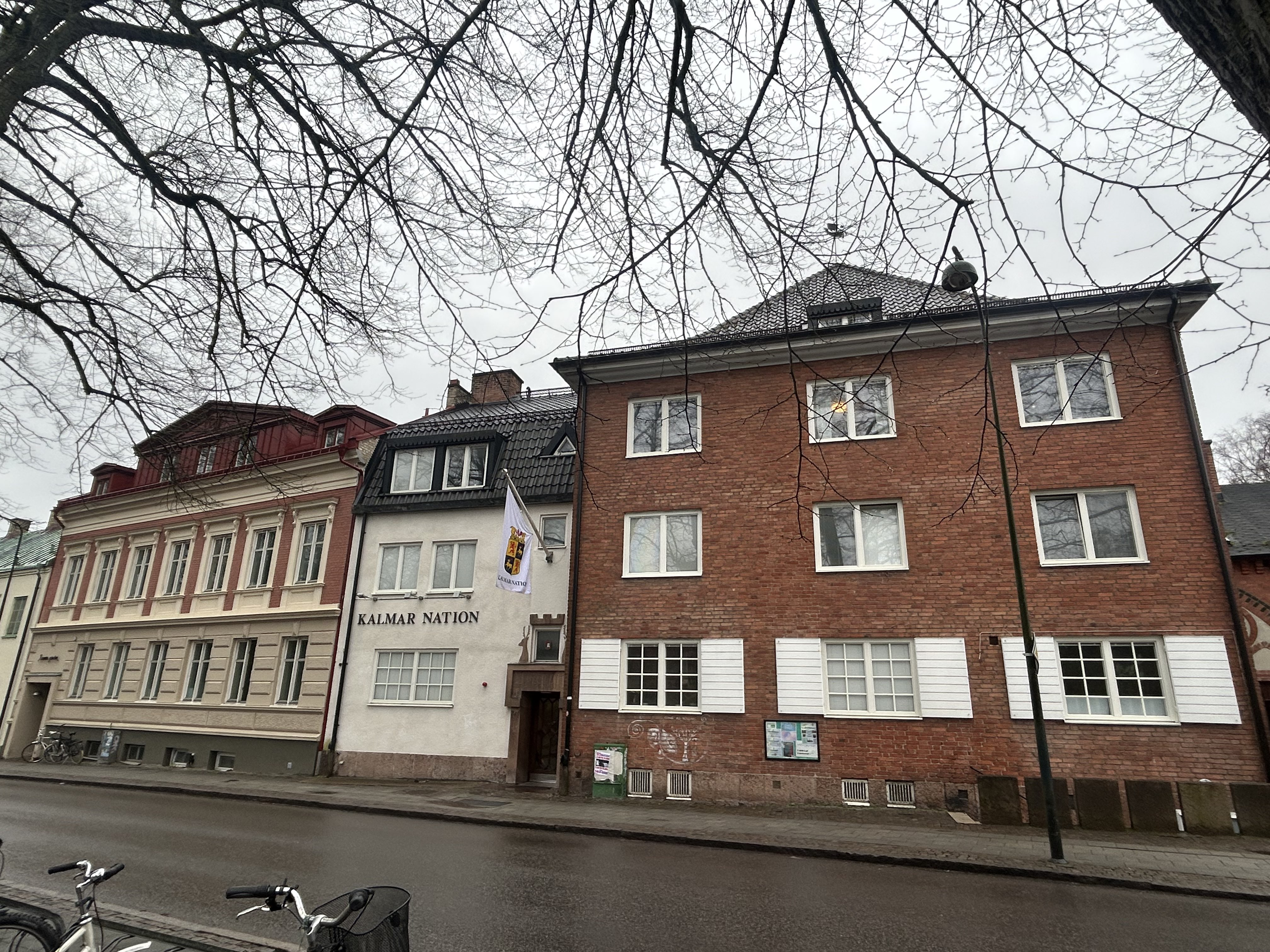
Roseniusgården (left) and Kalmargården - Kalmar Nation's two properties on Biskopsgatan.

The house was designed by Hans Westman. He gained inspiration from Domprostgården in Kalmar City. In 1991 the building was reconstructed. Today's Kalmargården stands at four floors consisting of 18 corridor rooms and 4 apartments.

=== Kalmar Västra ===
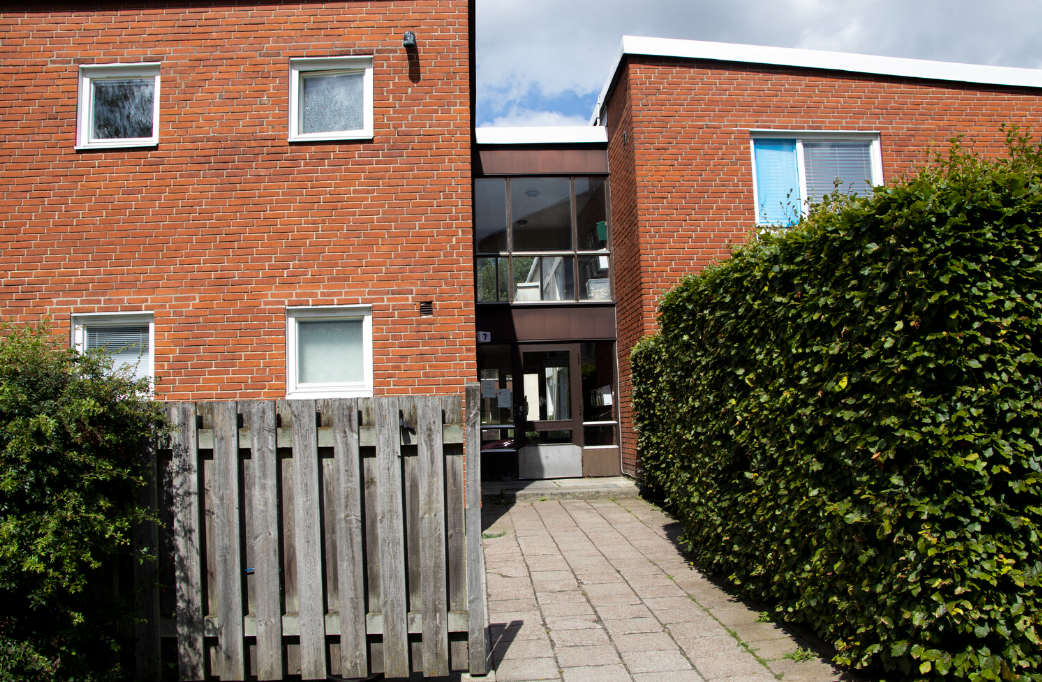
The entrance to Kalmar Västra on Måsvägen in western Lund, as seen from the south-east.

On Måsvägen in western Lund, the Nation's second housing complex, Kalmar Västra (Kalmar West) is located. The building consists of four corridors with 10 rooms each, along with 12 apartments in various sizes. The project, which Kalmar Nation joined in 1959, was originally spearheaded by Blekingska and Wermlands Nations and resulted in three properties being inaugurated in the Fall of 1960 - with Kalmar Västra being one of them.

=== Roseniusgården ===
Adjacent to Kalmargården at Biskopsgatan 14, Roseniusgården is a student housing complex that was operated by a private company prior to the nation's purchase of the property in 2023. It consists of 22 dorm rooms.

== Today ==
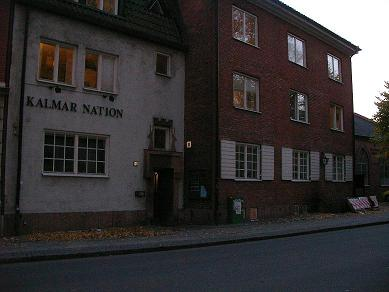
The Nation's main building, Kalmargården.

The nation has been described as an "international" nation, due to its large proportion of international and exchange student members.

Due to its smaller premises, there is no club space, making it the only nation to hold weekly pubs but no clubs. It is also the only nation open on Monday and Tuesday nights (Måndagspuben and Pub Ölkällaren respectively) in addition to its Friday pub (Pub Kaggen). The nation serves lunches (Lunch Neptuni) every Thursday. Kalmarspexarna, the nation's own spex, produces and performs its shows in English.

=== Kuratel ===
Kalmar Nation's Kuratel (executive management) consists of six posts, the Kurator (Q), the Prokurator Ekonomi (PQE), the Prokurator Social (PQS), the Notarie, the Källarmästare (KM) and the PR-Master (PRM).

==== Incumbent Kuratel ====
Kuratel (as of 1 July 2026)
Post	Incumbent
Kurator (chief executive and head representative)	Noah Björklöf Dolan (since 1 July 2026)
Prokurator Ekonomi (deputy to the Kurator, treasurer)	Cas Anderholm Hansson (since 1 January 2026)
Prokurator Social (HR, manager of kitchen and food purchases)	Vacant (since 1 August 2026)
Notarie (secretary of the board, responsible for administration and membership questions)	Love Källman (since 1 January 2025)
Källarmästare (facilities manager and responsible for alcohol events)	Hugo Ländin (since 1 July 2026)
PR-Mästare (PR manager)	Christy Abou Saad (since 1 July 2026)

== Notable members ==
- Gustaf Aulén (1879–1977) - Bishop of Strängnäs and Lutheran theologian. Served as Inspektor from 1930 to 1932.
- Per Stjernquist (1912–2005) - Law professor who introduced the teaching of sociology of law at Lund University. Served as Inspektor from 1954 to 1996.
- Martin Hägerdal (1966–) - Entrepreneur and CEO.
- Märta Stenevi (1976–) - Member of the Riksdag for the Green Party (Sweden). Previous Minister for Gender Equality and Minister for Housing.

== Additional reading ==
Detailed information and about the nation and its history is available in print from the nation office in Lund.

- Sjöström, Carl (1915). Kalmar nation i Lund 1670–1914 - Biografiska och genealogiska anteckningar jemte historia (in Swedish). Lund. LIBRIS 440595.
- Kalmar nation i Lund 1892–1917 – Vid hundraårsjubileet den 30 april 1917
- Kalmar nation i Lund – Porträttalbum 1917–1927
- Birgit Arfwidsson: Kalmar nation i Lund 1927–1962
- Forskare ser på framtiden - Rapport från en tvärvetenskaplig diskussionsserie (Kalmar nations småskrifter I, 1982)
- Folket i trähusen - Om fattigdom i samhällets utkanter under mellankrigstiden (Kalmar nations småskrifter II, 1986)
- Kalmar nation och studietidens problem 1950-1990 (Kalmar nations småskrifter III, 1990)
- Hänryckningens tid: studentminnen från en småländsk hemvist i Lund - Kalmar nation 300 år (Kalmar nations småskrifter IV, 1996)
- Storaste Kroppkakan 100 år (Kalmar nations småskrifter V, 1997)
- Studentrevolten i Lund 1968/69 - Universitetsledningens policy (Kalmar nations småskrifter VI, 2000)
