= Johan Staël von Holstein =

Swedish entrepreneur (born 1963)

- Born: Lars Johan Magnus Bjers; 5 May 1963 (age 63); Halmstad, Sweden
- Occupation: Entrepreneur

Lars Johan Magnus Staël von Holstein (born Bjers; 5 May 1963) is a Swedish entrepreneur who co-founded dot-com companies such as Icon Medialab and LetsBuyIt during the early dot-com boom in Sweden. He was the CEO of the multi-level marketing company Crowd1, which has been identified as an illegal pyramid scheme by financial regulators internationally. A 2020 BBC Africa Eye investigation found that the company recruited heavily among financially vulnerable people in Africa, Asia and Latin America.

== Early life ==
Staël von Holstein was born in Halmstad. He studied at Stockholm University, majoring in marketing management.

== Career ==
Staël von Holstein worked as a consultant to Jan Stenbeck's Kinnevik group for several years.

He was an independent, right-wing columnist for the Stockholm edition of the newspaper Metro until 2008.

== Entrepreneurship ==
=== Icon Media Lab ===
Staël von Holstein co-founded Icon Medialab together with Jesper Jos Olsson, Erik Wickström, and Magnus Lindahl.

The company went public in 1999 and continued rapid expansion with a US$70 million investment into the Asian market in 2000. At its peak the company had over 3,000 employees in 32 offices in cities around the globe. In 2001 its shares plunged more than 98% from their early 2000 peak and it axed around 500 jobs. In December 2001 shares of the debt-ridden company were suspended from the Stockholm stock exchange. The company was merged with rival Dutch web company Lost Boys in a reverse takeover to form a new Dutch-based company under CEO Rens Buchwaldt, and re-capitalized through a £12.4 million rights issue.

In the summer of 2000, Expressen ran an investigative series by Peter Kadhammar about Icon Medialab and Staël von Holstein, portraying him as a megalomaniac prone to frequent fits of rage. The series won Kadhammar the Stora journalistpriset. Staël von Holstein called it a character assassination commissioned by the Social Democrats and blamed Kadhammar for the company's bankruptcy.

=== LetsBuyIt ===
In 1998 Staël von Holstein founded LetsBuyIt, an online price comparison platform that enabled its users to share, compare, and buy various products. LetsBuyIt floated on Germany's Neuer Markt in July 2000, raising about US$60 million from a planned target of US$180 million in its initial public offering. It sought protection under the Dutch Bankruptcy Code (Faillissementswet) in December of the same year. After deferring bankruptcy through 2001, on 4 March 2002 it declared bankruptcy. Its staff had been reduced from 450 to 25.

=== IQube ===
In 2004, Staël von Holstein started IQube, but by 2009 IQube was wound-up, with Staël von Holstein's entire scheme described as "a fraud".

=== MyCube ===
Staël von Holstein founded MyCube in 2008. MyCube raised over US$8 million in funds in May 2011, then in August 2012 filed for voluntary liquidation.

=== Crowd1 ===
In 2019, Staël von Holstein was identified as the chief executive officer of the multi-level marketing company Crowd1, on the company's official YouTube channel as well as in a message sent to the members of the marketing network at the end of 2019.

In November 2019, Norway's gaming and foundation authority, Lotteri- og stiftelsestilsynet, determined that Crowd1 operated with a pyramid structure to generate revenue. In January 2020, in Burundi's largest city Bujumbura, Crowd1 was raided and over 300 people arrested, 17 of whom were placed in custody for promoting Crowd1, described as a Ponzi scheme.

In Paraguay on 6 February 2020 the Comisión Nacional de Valores (CNV) issued a securities fraud warning against Crowd1, advising against investment. CNV identified Crowd1 as an unregistered securities offering. Promoters of Crowd1 in Paraguay faced up to three years imprisonment or a fine. On 21 February 2020 the Bank of Namibia declared Crowd1 a pyramid scheme and warned the promoters to stop their activities immediately. The bank stated "Crowd1 does not sell tangible products or render any service of essential value, but the primary source of income for Crowd1 is the sale of membership packages to new members".

On 12 May 2020 the Philippines Securities and Exchange Commission (SEC) directed Crowd1 Asia Pacific to stop its "fraudulent" investing-taking activities immediately. On 1 June 2020 the Gabon Ministry of the Economy and Finance warned against the activities of Crowd1, stating that "these services are akin to pyramid scam systems in network marketing in which the profit does not come from the sales activity but from the recruitment of new members. Thus, only the designers of the said systems derived the benefits to the detriment of members." On 5 June 2020 the New Zealand Financial Markets Authority added Crowd1 and Impact Crowd Technology to its warning list due to concerns they may be involved in or operating a scam.

In June 2020 Vietnam’s Competition and Consumer Protection Department issued a warning against the activities of Crowd1, stating that "these operations were likely to be pyramid schemes and were prohibited according to the established regulations".

In July 2020 the government of Ivory Coast banned Crowd1 from operation in Ivory Coast, determining its sales system to be a Ponzi scheme. On 3 December 2020 Národná banka Slovenska, the central bank of the Slovak Republic, issued a securities fraud warning on the activities of Crowd1 Network Ltd and Impact Crowd Technology S.L.

In November 2020 the BBC investigative strand Africa Eye broadcast Unmasking the Pyramid Kings, reporting the results of a six-month investigation into Crowd1. It found that the company recruited financially vulnerable members across Africa, Asia and Latin America on the promise of income from selling digital products, charging around €99 for entry-level membership, and that its principal "educational package" was effectively worthless, its content taken almost verbatim from a book available free from the author's website. The programme concluded that Crowd1 operated as a recruitment-based pyramid scheme run from Europe by a group of mainly Swedish operators, and that it had left members in debt in countries including South Africa, Kenya and Nigeria.

Staël von Holstein, who had described himself in Crowd1 promotional material as "the CEO of this operation", has claimed not to be the CEO of Crowd1 but of the parent company Impact Crowd Technology, as well as of Tecnología de Impacto Multiple SL which was "the sole provider of Crowd1 products". He announced in December 2020 that he was leaving his CEO position, and ending all connections with Crowd1, for health reasons. Twelve countries had issued securities fraud warnings about Crowd1 but they did not include Sweden or Spain.

== Personal life ==
He is married and has two children, and lives in Spain, having previously lived in Holland, Thailand, Singapore, and Switzerland.
