= Student unionism in Finland =

In Finland the higher education system comprises two parallel sectors: universities and universities of applied sciences (polytechnics). Universities are characterised by scientific research and the highest education based thereon. Universities of applied sciences are oriented towards working life and base their operations on the high vocational skill requirements set by it.

== Universities – ylioppilaskunta, studentkår ==
Every university has a students' union (In Finnish, ylioppilaskunta and in Swedish, studentkår). Membership is mandatory by law for all students studying for a master's or bachelor's degree. A student union may also grant membership to other students of the university. The student unions are based on a parliamentary model, the general assembly (varying from 20 to 60 members) elected every second year using an open list election. The student union is autonomous, its internal life organised by its by-laws. The student unions are considered a part of Finnish administration, however, and their decisions can be appealed against to administrative courts. In such case, the claimant must prove that the decision has violated the law or by-laws.

The student unions are responsible for all representation of the students and elect the student members of different administrative organs, including the board of the university. According to the law, there must be student representation in every administrative body of the university. The student unions are also responsible for the health care of the students and usually coordinate and finance the activities of smaller, more specialized student organizations. For the financing of their activities, the student unions exact a membership fee and engage in different businesses. Differences in the scale of such businesses are mirrored in the fees exacted by the student unions. Generally, the older universities have wealthier student unions. For example, at Helsinki University of Technology, the student union owns and governs the dormitory village on the campus and rents some of their properties to the university itself, while the Student Union of the University of Helsinki owns several buildings in the very centre of the Helsinki city and has assets of more than 0.5 billion euros.

The university student unions organise extra curriculum activities, such as parties, sports events and access to sports facilities. They own a large number of cafeteria chains and even a multinational travel agency. Nearly all student unions publish one or more magazines, and some larger student unions offer nursing services for mothers while they go to the lectures. They are also a very active political power, commenting anything from municipal plans to national abortion laws. Student unions have organised demonstrations with up to 100,000 demonstrators and also run campaigns to affect the national and local politics during the elections. The National Union of University Students in Finland (SYL) pushed meal support into legislation in the 1970s, which nowadays provides all higher education students meals costing €3.10, not depending in the chain where one eats at. SYL also was able to negotiate a 50% discount on public transportation for the students.

The Helsinki university student union status was written into laws by the Russian emperor Alexander II in 1868. And some of the university organisations' status is still nowadays effective with the 1800s laws. Later on, during the civil war of Finland, the student unions held significant role in flourishing the Finnish culture, and the Finnish national anthem was first sung by the university students. Many of the Finnish presidents and high-ranking politicians have started their career in universities' student union politics.

The student unions are members of The National Union of University Students in Finland (SYL) , which represents the university students on the national and the international levels (a member of ESIB). SYL also takes part in the national law making process in topics related to the universities, students economical issues and the education. Part of the student unions are politically active, while in others, nations and subject association groups are dominant in the general assembly. Some of the student unions are active in municipal, global and local political questions, whereas some of the student unions see the protection of their students economical situation and educational rights as their only mission.

== Polytechnics / universities of applied sciences ==
Every university of applied sciences also has a student union, and its status is guaranteed by law (according to the law it is a public corporation like ylioppilaskunta). The student unions are much younger in this sector because the dual model system that makes the higher education in Finland came in 1996. Membership in opiskelijakunta differs from ylioppilaskunta, because the membership is not mandatory and every student can decide whether to join the student union.

In Finland, the student union is autonomous, its internal life organized by its by-laws which are confirmed by the rector. The student unions are based on a parliamentary model, the general assembly elected every year. The student union represents all students and is responsible in electing the student members of different administrative organs. The student union finances its operations mainly with membership fees, financial support from the university and small business operations.

The student unions are members of the organization Union of Students in Finnish Universities of Applies Sciences (SAMOK) . SAMOK represents students on both the national and international level (a member of ESIB). Student unions in Finland are not politically active and the candidate lists for general assembly elections are not divided into political parties such as usually the case in universities.

== Secondary schools / upper secondary school student councils ==
Most upper secondary schools have an elected student body, which represents student interests and communicates with the headmaster and the staff. There are four national school student unions: The Union of Finnish Upper Secondary School Students (In Finnish, Suomen Lukiolaisten Liitto) which represents students in general upper secondary education, Suomen opiskelija-allianssi - OSKU and Ammattiin opiskelevat - SAKKI who both represent students in vocational upper secondary education, and The Swedish-speaking School Student Union of Finland (In Swedish, "Finlands Svenska Skolungdomsförbund") which represents Swedish-speaking students in both general and vocational upper secondary education (as well as Swedish-speaking students in the upper classes of primary school, which as a group has no other national representation).

== Conscription army - Reserve Officer School ==
Conscripts in the Finnish Defence Forces who are training as reserve officers at the Reserve Officer School have a student council. It is a democratically governed, autonomous organization of conscripts within a military structure.
