= Helsingkrona Nation =

Student nation in Lund, Sweden

Coordinates: 55°42′36″N 13°12′28.8″E

- Helsingborgs-Landskrona Nation
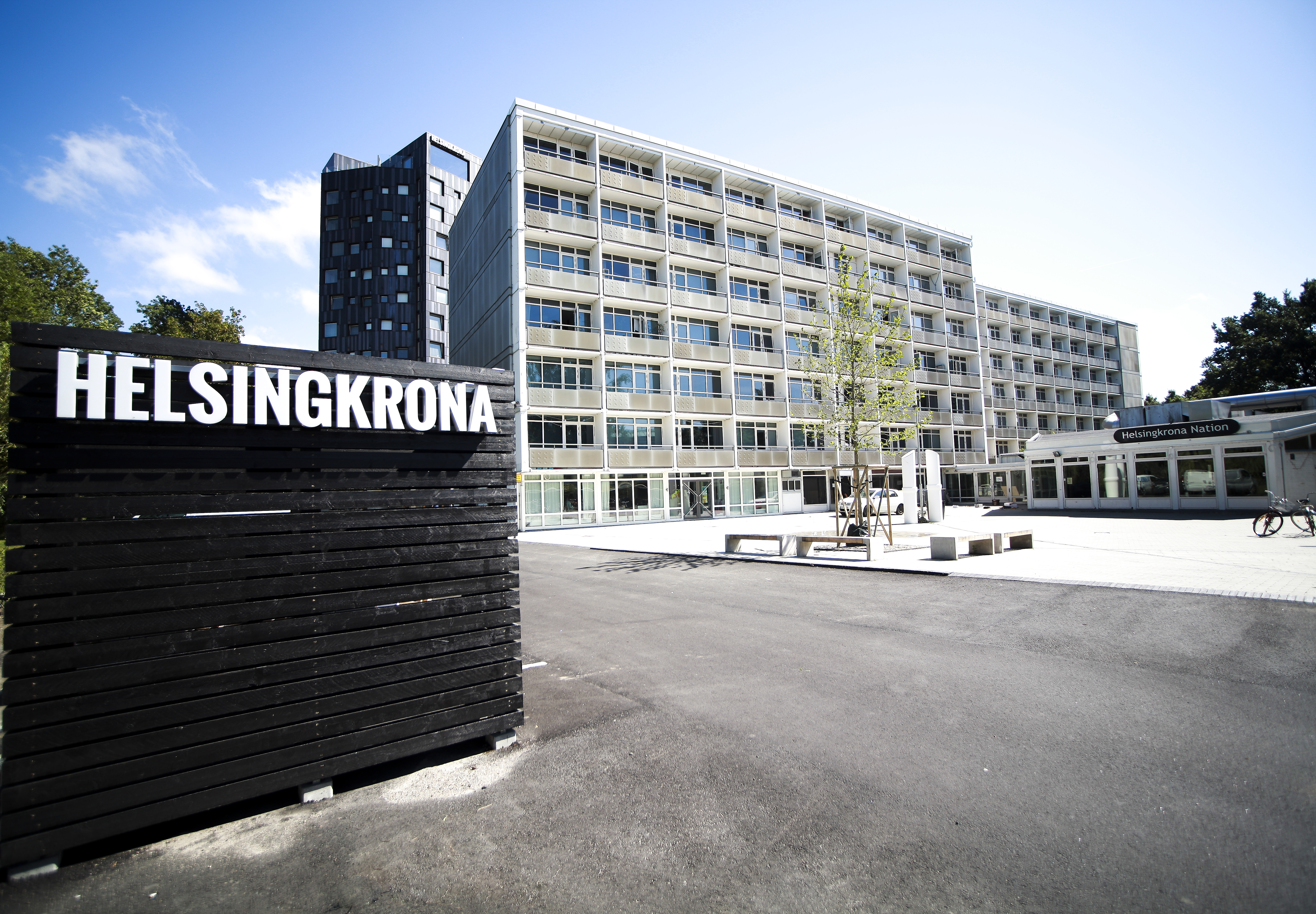
- Helsingkronagården, with two of the nation's three housing properties, Huset ("the house", right) and Tornet ("the tower").
- Abbreviation: HB
- Named after: The cities of Helsingborg and Landskrona
- Predecessor: Skånska Nationen
- Formation: 1890
- Type: Student nation
- Headquarters: Tornavägen 3C, Lund, Sweden
- Members: 3,728 (2026)
- Inspektor: Elsa Trolle Önnerfors
- Key people: Spring 2026: Markus Qvarfordh (Kurator); André Vincent Coelho (PQe); Ebba Axmin (PQs); Alva Rietz (Notary)
- Website: https://www.helsingkrona.se

Helsingkrona Nation, formally Helsingborgs-Landskrona Nation, is one of thirteen student nations at Lund University, Sweden. With its 3,728 members, it is the third-largest nation in Lund - ranking behind Göteborgs but ahead of Malmö Nation.

== History ==
The nation has its origins in one of the university's first nations, Skånska Nationen (named after, and composed of students from Scania) which existed from 1682 to 1833 when it split into five parts, with Helsingkrona being one of them. These four parts are still alive in the form of the Scanian Nations' Joint Committee, which to this day still gives out grants and organizes the quinquennial Gåsafesten ("Goose Fest"). In 1891, the Helsingkrona coat-of-arms, a merging of the coats-of-arms of Helsingborg and Landskrona, was produced and delivered to the Inspektor.

One of the most famous Swedish spexes, Uarda, was written by the two Helsingkronites Hilding Kefas Neander and Ludvig Thet gambla Ramberg in 1908. In 1954, another such spex, Djingis Khan, was written by Hans Alfredson and Patrick Meurling, the latter of whom would become Inspektor of Helsingkrona.

In 1958, Helsingkronagården, the nation's housing complex was inaugurated. Its first building, Huset, was designed by Sten Samuelson and was only five stories tall, since the fire department's ladders could not reach higher at the time. Regulations were changed in the middle of the 1960s and another two floors were added. Tornet, Helsingkrona's 13-floor residential tower was completed in the fall of 2015. In 2024, the nation inaugurated The Villa, the nation's third housing estate centered around communal spaces and co-living.

== Housing ==
The nation has three housing estates: The House - the residential part of the property known as Helsingkronagården, where the nation's club space and offices are located, The Tower and The Villa. The nation's estates neighbors the premises of LTH.

=== The House ===
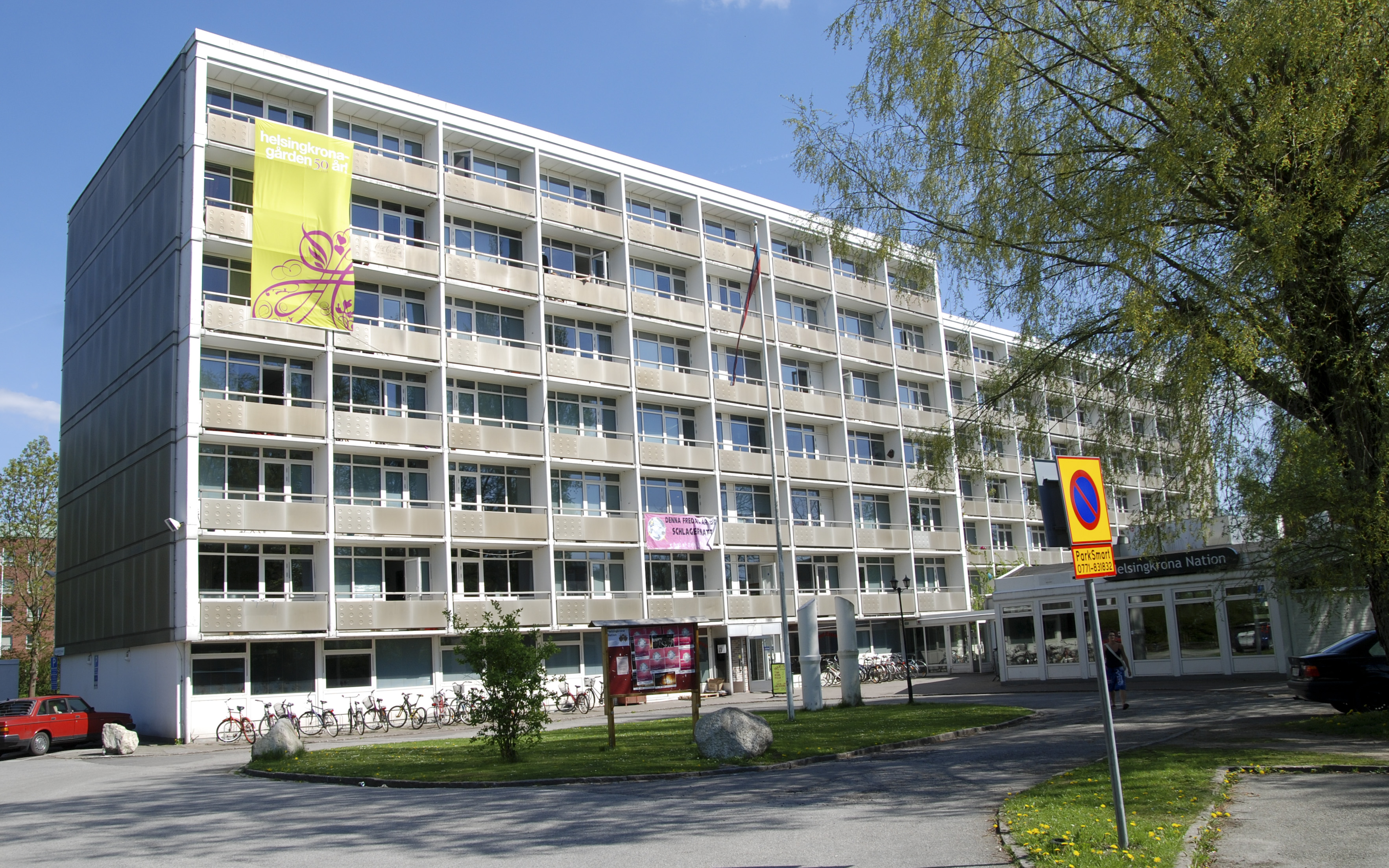
The Helsingkrona House in 2008.

Huset consists of 160 corridor rooms, 21 apartments and 8 rooms with pantries. It also houses a club area and unaffiliated pizzeria on its ground floor.

=== The Tower ===
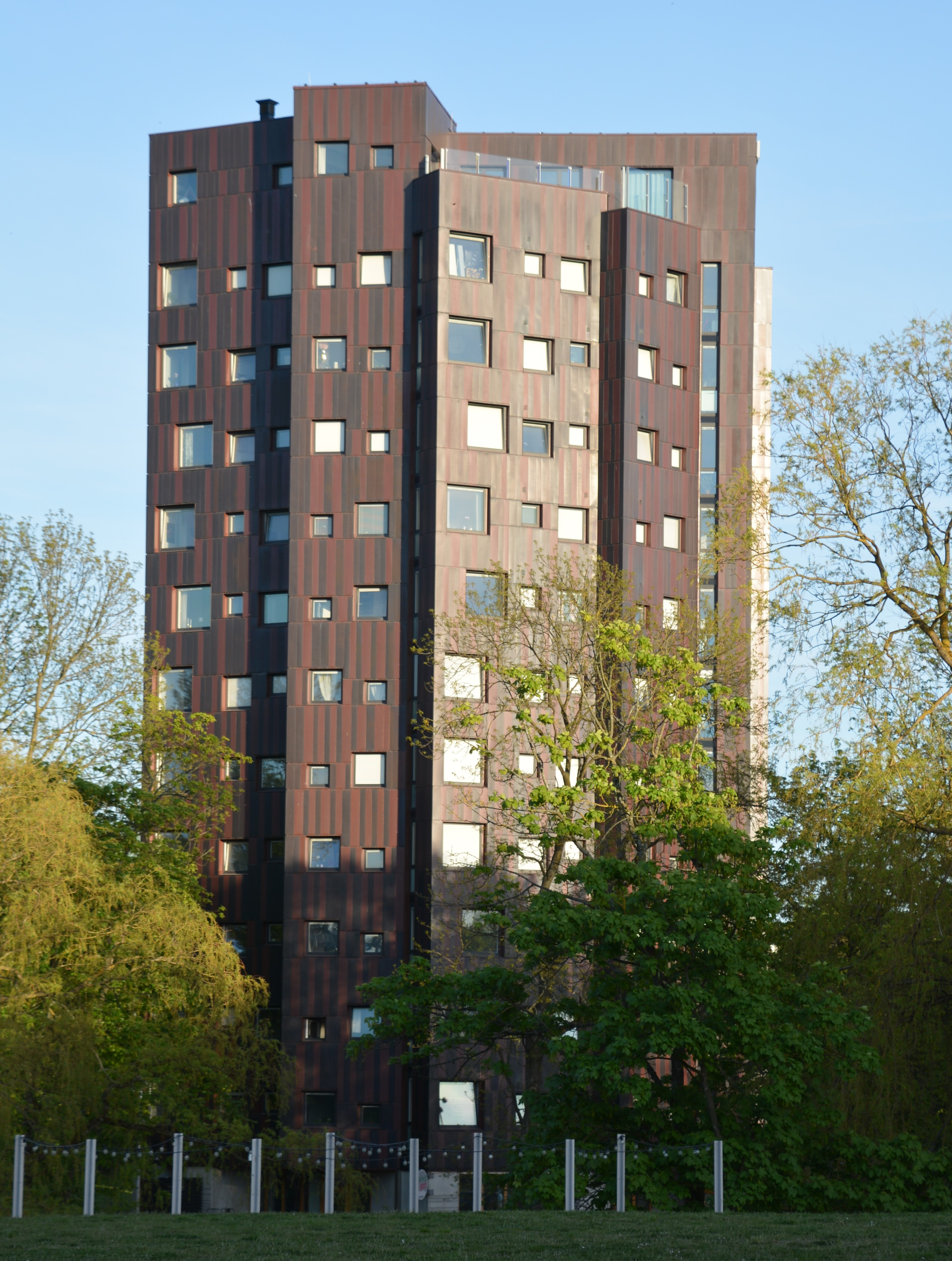
The Helsingkrona Tower, as seen from behind (the east)

Tornet has 13 floors with 69 apartments and a conference room with an associated kitchen on its top floor, which has a view of Lund, Malmö, the Öresund Bridge and Copenhagen. On the ground floor, there is a salad bar and a studying room.

=== The Villa ===
Villan has 59 co-living "ten-room" apartments spread across 7 floors, as well as a basement with a common space for tenants.

In 2022, construction started on a third housing development on the southern part of the nation's property. During construction the project was known as Helsingkrona Söder and HB Söder (Helsingkrona South). The project was green-lit in 2021, however construction was delayed due to high interest rates, electricity prices and an environmental clean-up of the area. It cost millions more than originally anticipated. Nonetheless, the property was inaugurated as The Villa in March 2024 with tenants being able to move in from April.

== Notable members ==
- Johan Stenström, literary scholar and professor.
- Gabriel Jönsson, author and poet.
- Gun Hellsvik, politician and former Minister of Justice.
- Hans Alfredson, actor, writer and comedian.
