= Nations in Swedish universities =

Type of student society

The student nations or nationer at the two ancient universities in Uppsala and Lund, of which there are now thirteen at each university, are the oldest student societies in Sweden. The Uppsala nations have a history stretching back to around 1630–1640. (Note: Since 2011, the nation of Snerikes officially claims descent from an early version of Södermanland Nation, founded in 1595. Although a nation with the name Södermanland did exist in said year, its connection to the present organisation is unproven.) The nations in Lund were formed at the time of the foundation of the university (1666) or shortly thereafter.

Traditionally, students were required to be members of the nation corresponding to the area from which they came. With one exception, Södermanland-Nerikes nation at Uppsala, this requirement is now voided, and students may even join more than one nation. International students are also free to choose whichever nation they desire. The nations are in charge of the sorts of social activities and venues that at other universities are handled by the student unions, fraternities, or companies: bars, clubs, theatre companies, orchestras, sports societies, and also some housing. Nations notably host gasques, themed dinner parties that are a traditional part of Swedish student life.

The nations take their names from the Swedish provinces from which they traditionally recruited their members, but do not always adhere to the strict practice of limiting membership according to those principles. These are named on regional lines, where the nations in Lund take their names from provinces and areas in southern Sweden, and those in Uppsala take their names from all over Sweden, except for the Scanian lands, the traditional catchment area for Lund, which was founded in 1666 to provide higher education for the youth in the newly conquered areas. (Note: There was a "Skånelandens nation" in Uppsala, but it had no activity, and only existed as a legal fiction for students who had to obligatorily join a nation for student benefits such as: student cards, discounts, entry to the nations etc. but did not want to be associated with any nation. This changed in 2010 when members were no longer required to come from a province to join a particular nation and when the student union offered students membership independent of the nations)

In addition to Uppsala and Lund, student nations were also formed at the University of Tartu and Royal Academy of Turku (now University of Helsinki), the second and third oldest universities in the Swedish Empire. Nowadays there are 15 student nations in the University of Helsinki and one in the Helsinki University of Technology.

Swedish educational institutions also have student unions, political and religious student societies, etc. Student nations exist at other Swedish universities as well, but they are strictly social organisations and membership is not required of all students.

Sweden also receives a relatively great number of foreign students, who are fully entitled to join the student nations. The universities that top the number of admitted students from abroad are Lund University (578) and KTH Royal Institute of Technology (503).

== See also ==
- Nation (university)
- Uppsala University
  - List of Uppsala University nations
- Lund University
  - List of Lund University nations
- University of Helsinki
  - Student nations at Helsinki University
- University of Tartu
- Student nations at the University of Paris
- Inspektor
