= Inspektor =

Chairman of some student nations

Inspektor or inspehtori, Swedish and Finnish for inspector, is the largely honorary chairman of student nations in Lund and Uppsala universities in Sweden and University of Helsinki in Finland. The inspektor has a supervisory role in their nation and presides over most important functions. It is a quite prestigious role to be invited to undertake as it implies the trust and respect of the student community. The inspektor may be of either gender and is usually a professor (although in Sweden any member of the university's teaching staff is acceptable). The position originated at The Royal Academy of Turku in 1643 as a way for the university administration to keep watch on the student population after it was realised that the university was unable to forbid the nation system outright. The universities at Uppsala and Lund followed soon after.

In many nations, the inspektor is also the chairman of the nation's governing committee. They used to be present at the nation's annual general meeting (called Landskap in Uppsala and Nationsmöte in Lund) as well as other special occasions such as the Newcomer's Feast ("Novichfest" or "Recentiorsgasque"). Mostly it is the inspektor who makes the speech of honour at the end of each formal dinner in the nation and at the end of each semester they ceremonially "send the students home".

Inspektors now also exist at some technical colleges, at some other universities and in some Swedish student unions. In the latter, the inspektor has some role as a person to whom one may complain about university processes.

== See also ==
- List of Lund University Nations
- Nations at Uppsala University
- Nations at Finnish universities
