= Nation (university) =

Archaic student union of compatriots

Student nations or simply nations (Latin: natio meaning "being born") are regional corporations of students at a university. Once widespread across Europe in medieval times, they are now largely restricted to the oldest universities of Sweden and Finland, in part because of the violent conflicts between the nations in university towns in other countries. Medieval universities were cosmopolitan, with students from many different domestic and foreign regions. Students who were born within the same region usually spoke the same language, expected to be ruled by their own familiar laws, and therefore joined together to form the nations. In the English-speaking world, the institutions most closely comparable to the medieval nation system are perhaps the collegiate system of older British universities or fraternities at North American universities, though the comparisons are imperfect. In Portugal and Brazil, there are fraternities called repúblicas, but these are merely residential groups and have nothing to do with place of origin.

== Examples in medieval universities ==
=== University of Paris ===
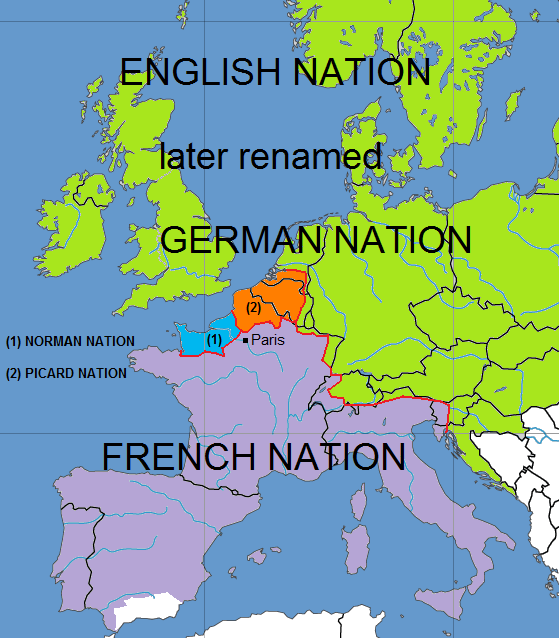
Map showing the territories covered by the four original nations of the University of Paris during the Middle Ages

In the University of Paris there were the French, Normans, Picards, and the English, the last replaced by the Alemannian (German) nation after the Hundred Years' War. Jean Gerson was twice elected procurator for the French natio (i.e. the French-born students at the university) in 1383 and 1384, while studying theology at Paris. Also at Paris, Germanic speakers were grouped into a single nation.

The various nations in Paris often quarreled with one another; Jacques de Vitry wrote of the students:

They affirmed that the English were drunkards and had tails; the sons of France proud, effeminate and carefully adorned like women. They said that the Germans were furious and obscene at their feasts; the Normans, vain and boastful; the Poitevins, traitors and always adventurers. The Burgundians they considered vulgar and stupid. The Bretons were reputed to be fickle and changeable, and were often reproached for the death of Arthur. The Lombards were called avaricious, vicious and cowardly; the Romans, seditious, turbulent and slanderous; the Sicilians, tyrannical and cruel; the inhabitants of Brabant, men of blood, incendiaries, brigands and ravishers; the Flemish, fickle, prodigal, gluttonous, yielding as butter, and slothful. After such insults from words they often came to blows.

=== University of Oxford ===
The students who attended the medieval university in Oxford formed themselves into two constantly quarreling nations who were called the australes and the boreales. The australes originated from south of the River Trent and were the more powerful of the two nations. The Welsh were also considered part of the australes, along with scholars from Ireland and the Romance lands. The boreales came mainly from Scotland and the north of England.

The nations at Oxford were eventually disbanded in 1274 in an effort to maintain peace in the town. Despite this measure, conflicts between the nations continued. One such came on 29 April 1388, when Welsh students, who were according to the chronicler Henry Knighton semper inquieti, fought with their northern counterparts. The following year a chronicler says that the boreales ran amok in the town chanting "war, war, war, slay, slay, slay the Welsh dogs", killing and looting as they went, before rounding up the remaining Welsh students and forcing them to kiss the town's gateposts 'goodbye'.

=== University of Prague ===
A similar division of students had been adopted at the Charles University in Prague, where from its opening in 1348 the studium generale was divided among Bohemian (for local students), Bavarian, Saxon, and Polish nations. When there was not a natio of a student's birth territory, students were assigned to one of those existing.

Due to the Decree of Kutná Hora in 1409, the three foreign nations were merged into one and three other votes were for the Bohemian students. The exodus of students who had belonged to the German nations led to a decline in the university's prestige and the creation of the University of Leipzig.

=== University of Leipzig ===
When the University of Leipzig was established in 1409 by scholars from the University of Prague, the new university's nationes were modeled on those of Prague, replacing the Bohemian natio with one for local students from the Margravate of Meissen, becoming the Natio Misnensium, with the other nationes remaining those of the Saxonum (Saxony), Bavarorum (Bavaria), and Polonorum (Poland).

=== University of Bologna ===
In medieval Bologna, there existed three separate universities. There were two for the study of law, one for students from Italy (but not Bologna), the universitas citramontanorum (lit. 'cismontane university') and another for students from outside the peninsula, the universitas ultramontanorum (lit. 'ultramontane university'). The third school was for the study of the arts and medicine, universitas artisarum et medicorum. The ultramontane university was divided into fourteen different nations as early as 1265: the Gauls, Picards, Burgundians, Turonenses (those from Tours), Pictavienses (those from Poitiers), Normans, Catalans, Hungarians, Poles, Germans, Provençals, English, and Gascons, whereas the citramontane university was split into three nations: Romans, Tuscans and Lombards.

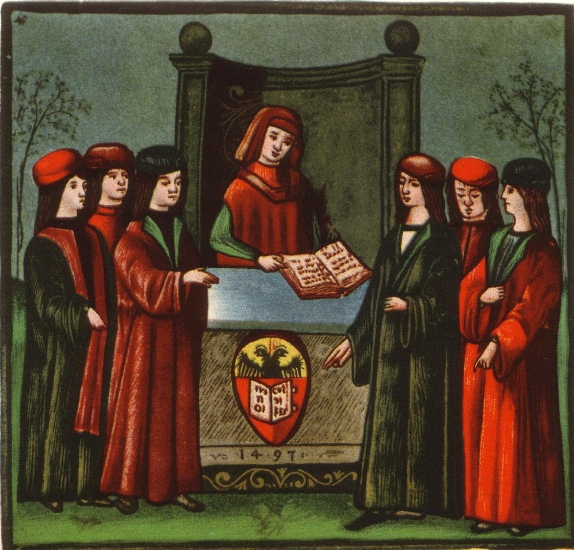
Students entering the Natio Germanica Bononiae (15th century)

The most important and powerful nation of the ultramontane University of Bologna was the German nation. One of its most famous members was Nicolaus Copernicus who, in 1496, enrolled into the Natio Germanorum (Nation of the Germans), a privileged university organization that included German-speaking students from many regions of Europe.

=== University of Padua ===
Students in the University of Padua were divided into 22 nations, which referred to the different territories ruled by the Republic of Venice, to the biggest states of Italy, and to the main states of Europe. Nations were: German (also called Alemannian), Bohemian, Hungarian, Provençal, Burgundian, Spanish, Polish, English, Scottish, Venetian, Overseas (Venetian Greek Islands), Lombard (East Lombardy and West Veneto), Trevisan (North and East Veneto), Friulian, Dalmatian, Milanese, Roman, Sicilian, Anconitan, Tuscan, Piedmontese and Genoan.

== Finland ==
In Finland, student nations (Finnish: osakunnat, Swedish: nationer) exist at the University of Helsinki and Aalto University, where they are legally sanctioned and were established in the mid-1600s (in the Royal Academy of Turku) and 1800s (in the to-be Polytechnical School), respectively. Named after regions in Finland, students had to join according to their own geographical roots before membership became voluntary in 1937. Today, students can usually choose to join any nation. Both Finnish and Swedish speaking nations exist. Organizations termed nations exist also at other universities, although these are legally considered normal registered or unregistered associations. In Finland, student nations co-exist with a wide range of other student organizations, such as student unions.

== Scotland ==
Nations exist in some of the ancient universities in Scotland, although their significance has largely been forgotten. Nations never existed at the University of Edinburgh, and were abolished at the University of St Andrews following discussions at the Royal Commission on the Universities of Scotland, which later led to the Universities (Scotland) Acts. Student nations continued into modern times at the University of Aberdeen and the University of Glasgow for the specific purpose of electing a Rector of the university.

== Sweden ==
When Uppsala University was founded in 1477, the system of nationes was copied from Sorbonne in Paris. At the Swedish universities of Uppsala and Lund, a system of student nations (nationer) remains and, until 30 June 2010, students were required to enroll in a nation. Now membership is voluntary, though most of the students choose to be members. The Nations in Finland were founded according to the Swedish tradition. Historically, Tartu University, founded in 1632 in then-Swedish Estonia, also had a nation system.

The nations are named on regional lines: the nations in Lund take their names from provinces and areas in southern Sweden; those in Uppsala take theirs from the ecclesiastical dioceses all over Sweden except for the Scanian lands, the traditional catchment area for Lund (which was founded in 1666 to provide higher education for the youth in the newly conquered areas). (Until 2010, there was a Skånelandens nation in Uppsala, but it had no activity and only existed as a legal fiction for those students who did not wish to take part in a student nation.)

Students were traditionally required to be a member of the nation from whose area they came, but this is no longer the case; however, Södermanlands-Nerikes nation at Uppsala exceptionally retains an area restriction, though (as before) the restriction does not apply to international students. Nowadays, nations organize social activities that at other universities are normally handled by student unions, such as bars, clubs, orchestras, sports societies, theater companies, and also some housing.

== See also ==
- Landsmannschaft (Studentenverbindung)
- Zemlyachestvo - similar groups that existed in 19th century Russia
- Studentenvereniging - modern equivalent in Netherlands and Belgium
- Fraternities and sororities
