= 40 ljuva år! =

Compilation album by Lasse Stefanz
- Released: 27 December 2006
- Recorded: 1970–1996
- Genre: dansband music
- Label: Warner Music Sweden

Lasse Stefanz chronology
Pickup-56 (2006)	40 ljuva år! (2006)	Vagabond (2007)

40 ljuva år! is a compilation album from Swedish dansband Lasse Stefanz released on 27 December 2006. The album reached number one on the Swedish album chart.

== Track listing ==
1. Ett äventyr
2. Hej, fröken Sommar
3. Farväl, farväl
4. De sista ljuva åren
5. Den lilla klockan
6. Över bergen skall det klinga
7. Orgeln på vinden
8. Huset i dalen
9. Ye-si-ca
10. Marie, Marie
11. Lassie
12. Quando
13. Skattlösa bergen (Wolverton Mountain)
14. Det smärtar mitt hjärta
15. Årets skiftningar
16. Tre unga män (I Wrote a Song)
17. Sommarnatt (Blaue Nacht)
18. Köp rosor
19. Vildandens klagan
20. Morgongåva
21. Skomakar Anton
22. Visa i Citruslunden
23. Du försvann som en vind,
24. Peppelinos bar
25. Världens lyckligaste par
26. Främling
27. Nere på Söder
28. Oh Julie
29. Dej ska jag älska
30. Katmandu
31. En gitarr
32. Gammal kärlek rostar aldrig
33. Kära Ruth
34. Klockorna i gamla stan
35. I kväll
36. Den sången han sjöng
37. Spelmansminnen
38. Dandy man
39. Rented tuxedo
40. What am I Living for
41. Traveling Light
42. Vid en liten fiskehamn
43. Darlin'
44. Ett litet munspel
45. Have You Ever Been Lonely

== Charts ==
=== Weekly charts ===
Chart (2007)	Peak position
Norwegian Albums (VG-lista)	2
Swedish Albums (Sverigetopplistan)	1

=== Year-end charts ===
Chart (2007)	Position
Swedish Albums (Sverigetopplistan)	25

== Certifications ==
Region	Certification	Certified units/sales
Norway (IFPI Norway)	Gold	20,000^{*}
Sweden (GLF)	2× Platinum	80,000^{‡}
^{*} Sales figures based on certification alone.^{‡} Sales+streaming figures based on certification alone.
