= Världens lyckligaste par =

Single by Lasse Stefanz and Lotta Engberg

from the album Nere på Söder
- A-side: "Världens lyckligaste par"
- B-side: "Nere på Söder"
- Released: 1986
- Genre: dansband
- Label: Mariann Records
- Songwriter: Christer Ericsson

"Världens lyckligaste par" is a song written and composed by Christer Ericsson, and originally recorded by Lasse Stefanz, featuring Olle Jönsson on lead vocals, as a duet with Lotta Engberg. The song lyrics depict a couple who has met and made each other happy, stayed together for year, and look bright upon the future.. The song was also released on a single in 1986.

The song charted at Svensktoppen for 17 weeks (including the summer break) between 17 May and 22 November 1987, and also topped the chart.

The song intro has also acted as opening theme for radio program Dansgolvet at Sveriges Radio P4 Jönköping.
