= Anders Vilhelm Lundstedt =

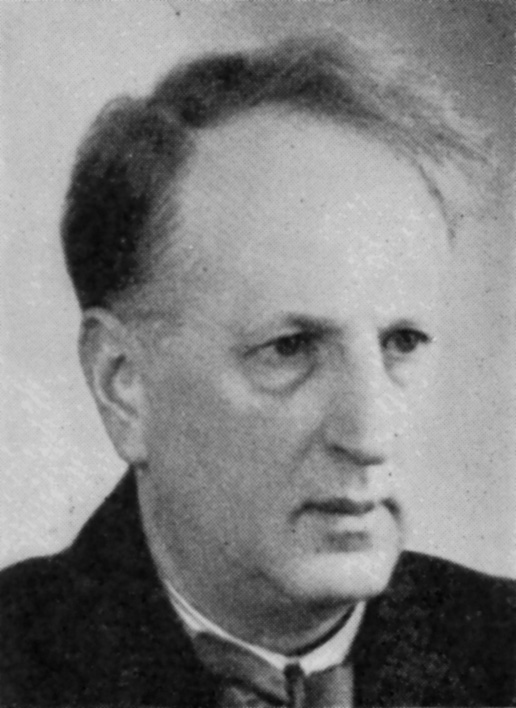
Anders Vilhelm Lundstedt

Anders Vilhelm Lundstedt (11 September 1882 – 20 August 1955) was a Swedish jurist and legislator, particularly known as a proponent of Scandinavian Legal Realism, having been strongly influenced by his compatriot, the charismatic philosopher Axel Hägerström. He studied law at Lund University and was a professor of law at the University of Uppsala from 1914 to 1947. Like Hägerström, Karl Olivecrona and Alf Ross, he resists the exposition of rights as metaphysical entities, arguing that realistic legal analysis should dispense with them. Lundstedt's main focus in his theoretical work became a sustained attack on what he called the method of justice. He considered that there was no objective way to define the requirements of justice and that invocations of justice cloaked purely subjective preferences or unacceptable metaphysical claims. Instead, law and legislation should be guided by a method of social welfare centred on objective study of social conditions and of the practical effects and capabilities of law in improving society for all its members. Lundstedt was a member of the Swedish parliament for many years and promoted within it changes to the penal system and a range of other liberal reforms.

== Works ==
- Den historiska rättspositivismen: med särskild hänsyn till Bergbohms lära (Uppsala, 1929)
- Superstition or Rationality in Action for Peace (London, 1925)
- Die Unwissenschaftlichkeit der Rechtswissenschaft (Berlin, 1932 – 1936)
- Legal Thinking Revised. My Views on Law

== Bibliography ==
- Roger Cotterrell, 'Reading Juristic Theories In and Beyond Historical Context: The Case of Lundstedt's Swedish Legal Realism', in M. Del Mar and M. Lobban, eds, Law in Theory and History: New Essays on a Neglected Dialogue, Hart, Oxford, 2016.
- Wilhalm Fuchs, Die Zukunft der Rechtswissenschaft : Rechtswissenschaft als Gerechtigkeitswissenschaft : zugleich eine Auseinandersetzung mit Anders Vilhelm Lundstedt, Stuttgart, Kohlhammer Verlag, 1933.
- Realino Marra, Anders Vilhelm Lundstedt. per una scienza realistica del diritto penale, in I. Fanlo Cortés-R. Marra, ed, Filosofia e realtà del diritto. Studi in onore di Silvana Castignone, Giappichelli, Torino, 2008, pp. 89–100.
