= Lasse Stefanz stora julparty =

Lasse Stefanz Stora Julparty

Studio album by Lasse Stefanz
- Released: 4 December 2013
- Genre: Christmas, country, dansband music
- Label: Warner Music Sweden

Lasse Stefanz chronology
Trouble Boys (2013)	Lasse Stefanz Stora Julparty (2013)	Honky Tonk Rebels (2014)

Lasse Stefanz stora julparty is a Lasse Stefanz studio album, released on 4 December 2013. The album topped the Swedish albums chart. Despite the title, the album consists of no Christmas songs, but instead features ordinary songs.

== Track listing ==
1. Coca-cola och en hot burrito
2. Socker och salt
3. Varje ensam natt
4. Du vän i mitt liv
5. En man i ditt liv
6. Smokey places
7. Önska att det vore så
8. Bebop Cat
9. Dela min dröm med mig
10. Vagabond
11. Helen
12. Min rosa Cadillac
13. Är det så här det ska bli
14. A-11

== Charts ==
Chart (2013)	Peak position
Sweden (Sverigetopplistan)	1
