= Lasse Stefanz på Svensktoppen =

Compilation album by Lasse Stefanz
- Released: 13 August 1998
- Recorded: 1986–1997
- Genre: Country, dansband
- Label: Frituna

Lasse Stefanz på Svensktoppen was released in 1998 and is an album from Swedish "dansband" Lasse Stefanz. The songs on the album are Lasse Stefanz songs charting at Svensktoppen.

== Track listing ==
1. De sista ljuva åren
2. Oklahoma
3. Av hela mitt hjärta
4. Jag kommer hem igen
5. En gång är ingen gång
6. Mot nya mål
7. Dig ska jag älska
8. Du försvann som en vind
9. Nere på söder
10. En enkel sång om kärleken
11. Jag väntat många dagar
12. Visst är det kärlek
13. Du kan tro på mitt ord
14. Midsommarafton
