= Olivecrona =

Olivecrona is a surname. Notable people with the surname include:

- Karl Olivecrona (1897–1980), Swedish lawyer, brother of Herbert
- Herbert Olivecrona (1891–1980), Swedish neurosurgeon, brother of Karl
- Rosalie Olivecrona (1823–1898), Swedish feminist activist and writer, wife of Swedish lawyer Knut Olivecrona
