= Östgöta nation, Uppsala =

Swedish student society

Coordinates: 59°51′18.43″N 17°38′16.74″E

Östgöta Nation
- Uppsala University
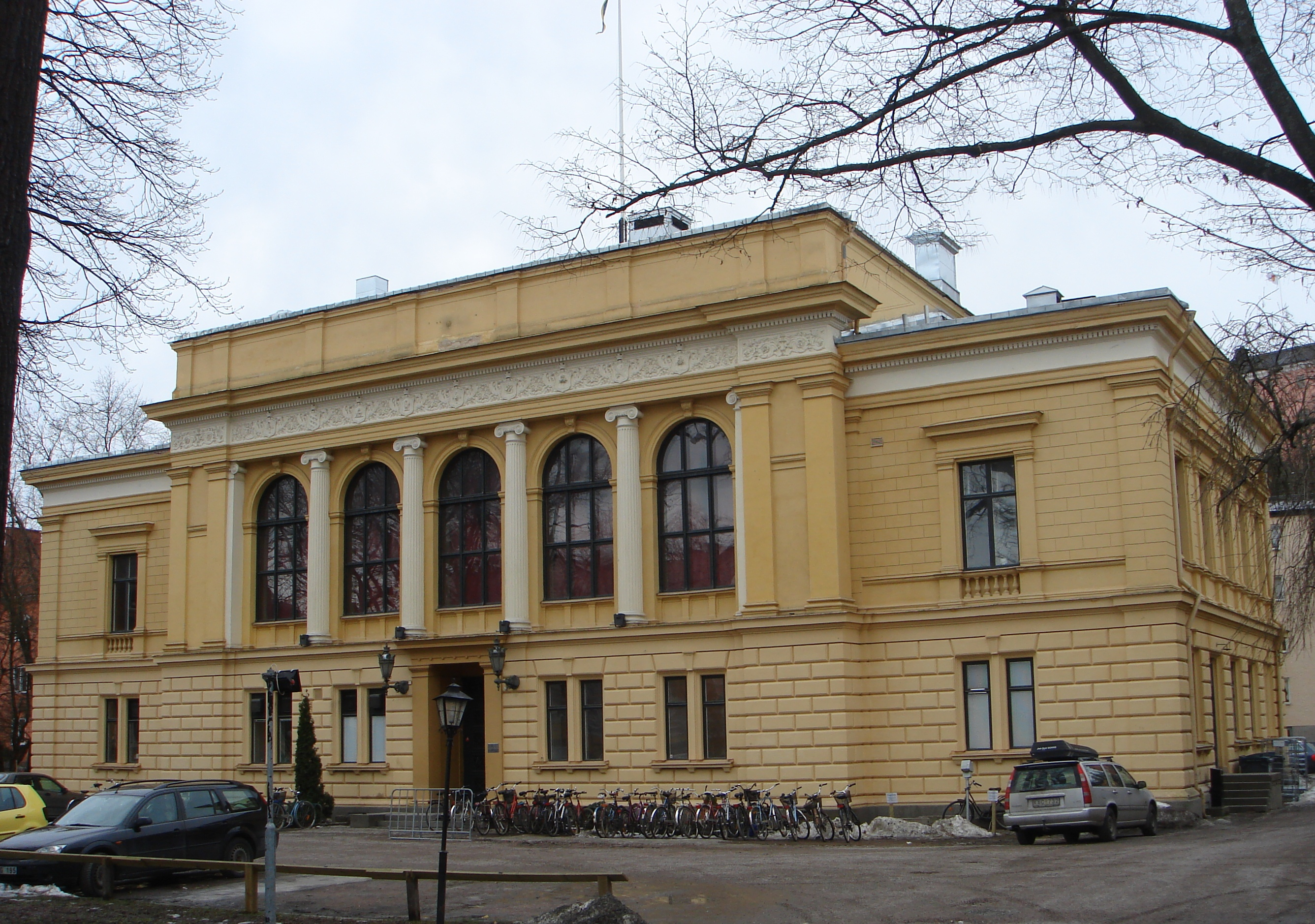
- Location: Trädgårdsgatan 15; 753 09 UPPSALA; Sweden
- Latin name: Natio Ostrogothica
- Abbreviation: ÖG
- Established: 1595
- Inspektor: Pernilla Åsenlöf
- Membership: ca 2600
- Website: www.ostgotanation.se

Östgöta nation or ÖG, as it is called informally, is a student society and one of thirteen nations at Uppsala University. Though Östgöta nation had existed in various forms previously, the nation's constitution was drawn up on 8 November 1646 and that is now considered its official date of creation.

The current nation building was completed in 1885 and renovated in 1996. The nation currently has about 2600 members, making it a mid-sized nation. Östgöta nation is, like all the other nations in Uppsala, run by students.

Notable people who have been members of the nation include Tage Danielsson, and Jöns Jacob Berzelius.

Axel Hägerström was Inspektor of the Östgöta nation from 1925 to his retirement in 1933.

== Inspektors ==
Östgöta nation

- Johannes Laurentii Stalenius 1645–1650
- Lars Fornelius 1650–1663
- Jonas Fornelius 1663–1679
- Olof Verelius 1679–1681
- Klas Örnhiälm 1681–1693
- Jakob Arrhenius 1693–1721
- Fabian Törner 1721–1731
- Matthias Asp 1731–1763
- Petrus Ekerman 1763–1779
- Johan Ihre 1779–1780
- Jacob Axelsson Lindblom 1781–1786
- Jacob Fredrik Neikter 1786–1802
- Samuel Liljeblad 1802–1815
- Jacob Åkerman 1815–1829
- Jacob Edvard Boethius 1829–1830
- Jöns Svanberg 1830–1841
- Vilhelm Fredrik Palmblad 1841–1852
- Gustaf Svanberg 1852–1875
- Carl Alfred Cornelius 1876–1886
- Frithiof Holmgren 1886–1897
- Carl Sundberg 1897–1900
- Olof August Danielsson 1900–1910
- Axel Wirén 1910–1925
- Axel Hägerström 1925–1933
- Tor Andræ 1933–1937
- Adolf Natanael Lindqvist 1937–1947
- Hjalmar Lindroth 1947–1960
- Kai Siegbahn 1960–1969
- Karl-Gustaf Hildebrand 1969–1974
- Olof Beckman 1974–1981
- Carl Göran Andrae 1981–1992
- Anna Sågvall Hein 1992–2005
- Ulf Pettersson 2005–2012
- Kerstin Sahlin 2012-2018
- Pernilla Åsenlöf 2018-

== See also ==
- Östgöta Nation, Lund
