= Nordische Gesellschaft =

Nazi organization

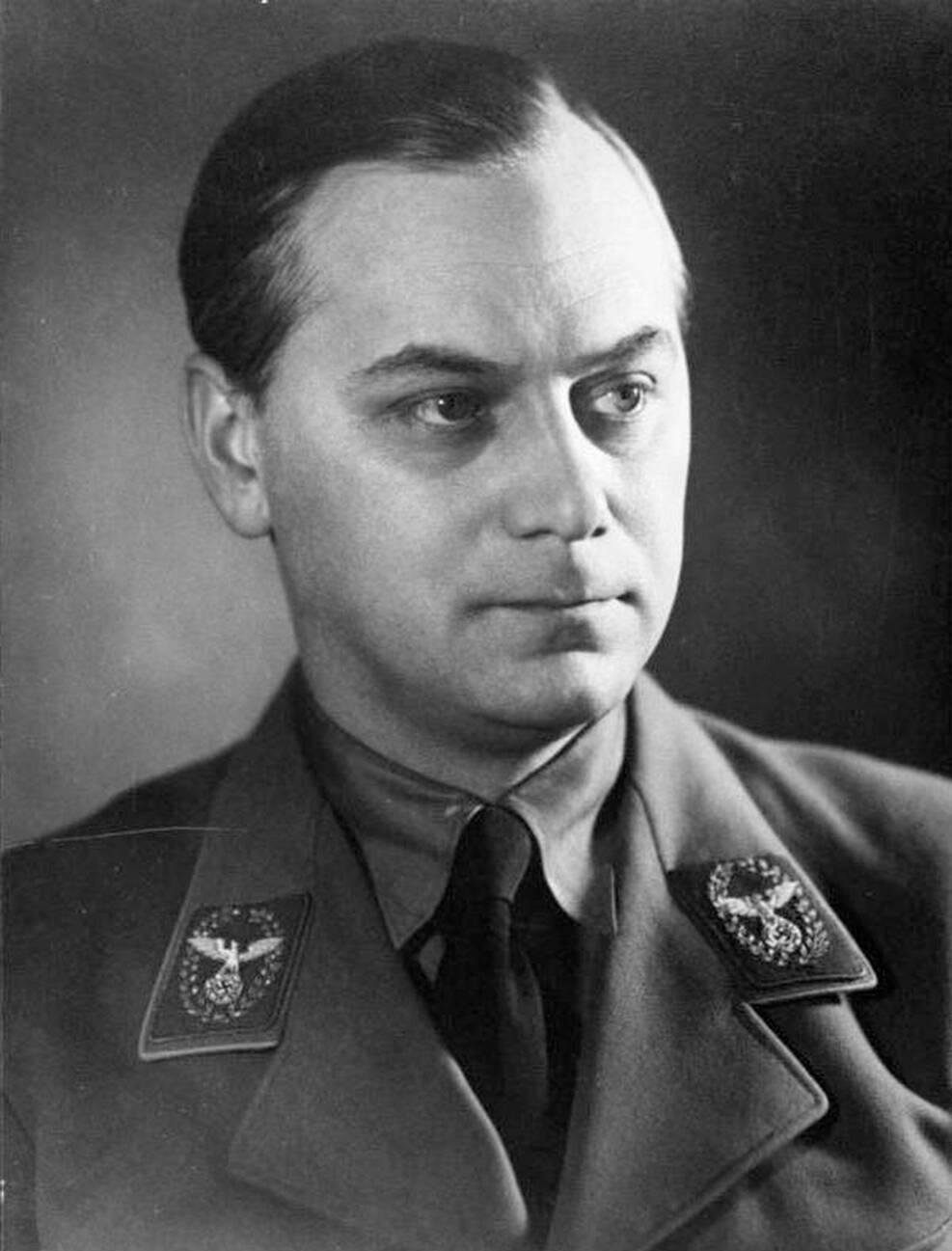
- Alfred Rosenberg in 1939
- Formation: 1921; 105 years ago
- Type: Association
- Purpose: Strengthening German-Nordic cultural and political cooperation
- Location: Lübeck, Germany
- Leader: Alfred Rosenberg
- Main organ: Pressedienst Nord and Der Norden

The Nordische Gesellschaft ("Nordic Society") was an association founded in 1921, with the objective of strengthening German-Nordic cultural and political cooperation. It was based in Lübeck, Germany. The association had both German and Scandinavian members. After the Nazi Party's takeover of Germany in 1933, the Nordische Gesellschaft came under the control of Alfred Rosenberg. A new board was formed. Rosenberg's ambition was that the organization could be utilized for the Nazi cause. Heinrich Himmler became a member of the board.

As of 1940, the association had 40 local branches in different parts of Germany. The association published a notable number of books and brochures which were distributed in Scandinavia.

During the Second World War, it ran two publications, Pressedienst Nord and Der Norden, directed towards influencing the political debate in the Scandinavian countries towards a pro-German position.

== Der Norden ==
Der Norden ('The North') was the flagship of the publishing activities of Nordische Gesellschaft. Initially known as Der Nordische Aufseher, it got the name Der Norden in 1935. It dealt mainly with Nordic issues and actively tried to foster a concept of a common Baltic Sea historical and cultural heritage, based on the legacy of the Hanseatic league. The publication presented the Hanseatic period as a golden era of the region. Several Scandinavian writers had their articles published in Der Norden.

Der Norden had a monthly edition of around 6,000 to 7,000. It is assumed that the last issue was published in October 1944.

== Pressedienst Nord ==
Pressedienst Nord ('Press Service North') was published weekly. In the summer of 1940 it had a pressrun of 3000 weekly. Its pressrun gradually increased until the spring of 1941. From that point until February 1945, its pressrun was 10,000 weekly. Its articles were mainly in German language but some were in Scandinavian languages, especially in Norwegian.

The articles dealt mainly with Nordic issues. The publishing house did a conscious effort to include Scandinavian writers, such as Knut Hamsun, Erling Bjørnson and Karl Olivecrona.

The publication was rather thin, and printed on cheap paper. Images were rare, and generally limited to political caricatures.

== Wirtschaftswart Nord ==
A third publication issued by the association, with much smaller edition, was Wirtschaftswart Nord ('Economy Warden North'). The publication was dedicated to economics, and was not used for political purposes like the other two main publications of the association.

== Brochures ==
A sizeable amount of brochures were published by the association; most of them were part of the series Veröffentlichungen der Nordischen Gesellschaft zum Zeitgeschehen. One brochure in the series England oder Deutschland? ('England or Germany?'), written by Karl Olivecrona, had a print run of 80,000 copies. Published in 1941, was a translation from its Swedish original, England eller Tyskland?

== Cultural branch ==
A special 'cultural branch' was set up under the leadership of Heinrich Jessen, to facilitate contacts with the cultural and academic sphere in the Scandinavian countries. The cultural branch arranged yearly summer congresses in Lübeck, Reichstagung zur Sommersonnenwende.

== Activities in Sweden ==
The cultural branch worked actively throughout the war years to foster contacts with Swedish academics and artists. This work was often done in close cooperation with the cultural section of the German diplomatic representation in Stockholm. The activities included study visits, lectures and concerts in Germany and tours of German scholars and artists in Sweden. The branch also maintained correspondence with a large number of Swedish individual scholars, painters, musicians and artists. The branch sent large amounts of pro-German literature to these people, whom in turn distributed this literature amongst friends and colleagues. According to a Swedish state survey conducted directly after the war, the work of Nordische Gesellschaft played an important role in the German cultural propaganda work during the war.

== Activities in Norway ==
Johan Bojer and Barbra Ring played key roles in the Norwegian activities of Nordische Gesellschaft during the 1930s. Other important individuals in the networks of the association were Ronald Fangen, Tore Ørjasæter and Mikkjel Fønhus.

During the first six months of the German occupation of Norway, the organization was very active in trying to utilize the bonds forged with Norwegian writers during the 1930s. This endeavour was however largely unsuccessful. The most prominent writer who retained contacts with the association was Åsmund Sveen. Vidkun Quisling's Nasjonal Samling party never had any formal contacts with Nordische Gesellschaft.

== Other organizations ==
Nordische Gesellschaft was however not the sole organization dedicated to Nordic-German cultural exchange at the time. It faced competition from the Hamburg-based Deutsch-Nordische Gesellschaft and, to a lesser extent, Kulturabteilung des Auswärtigen Amtes in Berlin.
