= Ett litet rött paket =

1957 Owe Thörnqvist Christmas song

Song by Owe Thörnqvist
- Language: Swedish
- Released: December 1957
- Recorded: Metronome Studios, Stockholm, Sweden, November 1957
- Genre: Christmas, schlager
- Songwriter: Owe Thörnqvist

Ett litet rött paket is a song with lyrics and music by Owe Thörnqvist.

Owe Thörnqvist recorded the song in 1957, and it became a 1963 hit when Sven-Ingvars recorded it.

The song lyrics describe Owe Thörnqvist's hometown Uppsala, mentioning the Ofvandahls cafe and patisserie. Owe Thörnqvist and Sven-Ingvars sang different lyrics. Owe Thörnqvist sang När ljusen tändas i december månad ("When the candles are lit in the month of December") while Sven-Ingvars originally sang När ljusen tändas i februari månad. ("When the candles are lit in the month of February")

In 2008 Lasse Stefanz recorded the song on the album Svängjul.
