= Cuba Libre (disambiguation) =

A Cuba libre, or rum and Coke, is a cocktail made of cola and rum.

Cuba Libre may also refer to:

== Film and television ==
- Cuba Libre (film) or Dreaming of Julia, a 2003 comedy-drama film
- "Cuba Libre" (Law & Order: Criminal Intent), a 2003 episode of Law & Order: Criminal Intent

== Literature ==
- Cuba libre!, a 1999 novel by Régine Deforges
- Cuba Libre (novel), a 1998 novel by Elmore Leonard
- Cuba Libre: Breaking the Chains?, a 1987 book by Peter Marshall

== Music ==
- "Cuba Libre" an 1898 song by Charles Kassell Harris
- Cuba Libre (album), a 2011 album by Lasse Stefanz
- "Cuba Libre" (Gloria Estefan song) (1998)
- "Cuba Libre" (Moncho song) (2018)
- "Cuba Libre", a 2000 song by Aqua from Aquarius
- "Cuba Libre", a 1999 song by Gigi D'Agostino from L'Amour Toujours
- "Cuba Libre", a 2006 song by Zucchero from Fly
- "Cuba Libre", a 2016 song by Buck-Tick from Atom Miraiha No.9

== Other uses ==
- Camp Cuba Libre, a U.S. Army camp in Jacksonville, Florida during the Spanish–American War
- Cuba Libre, a type of cigar made by Nestor Plasencia
- Republic of Cuba (1902–1959), a period in Cuban history

== See also ==
- The Cuba Libre Story, a documentary series on Cuban history
