= Fjärdingen =

Area of Uppsala, Sweden

Coordinates: 59.855°N 17.640°E

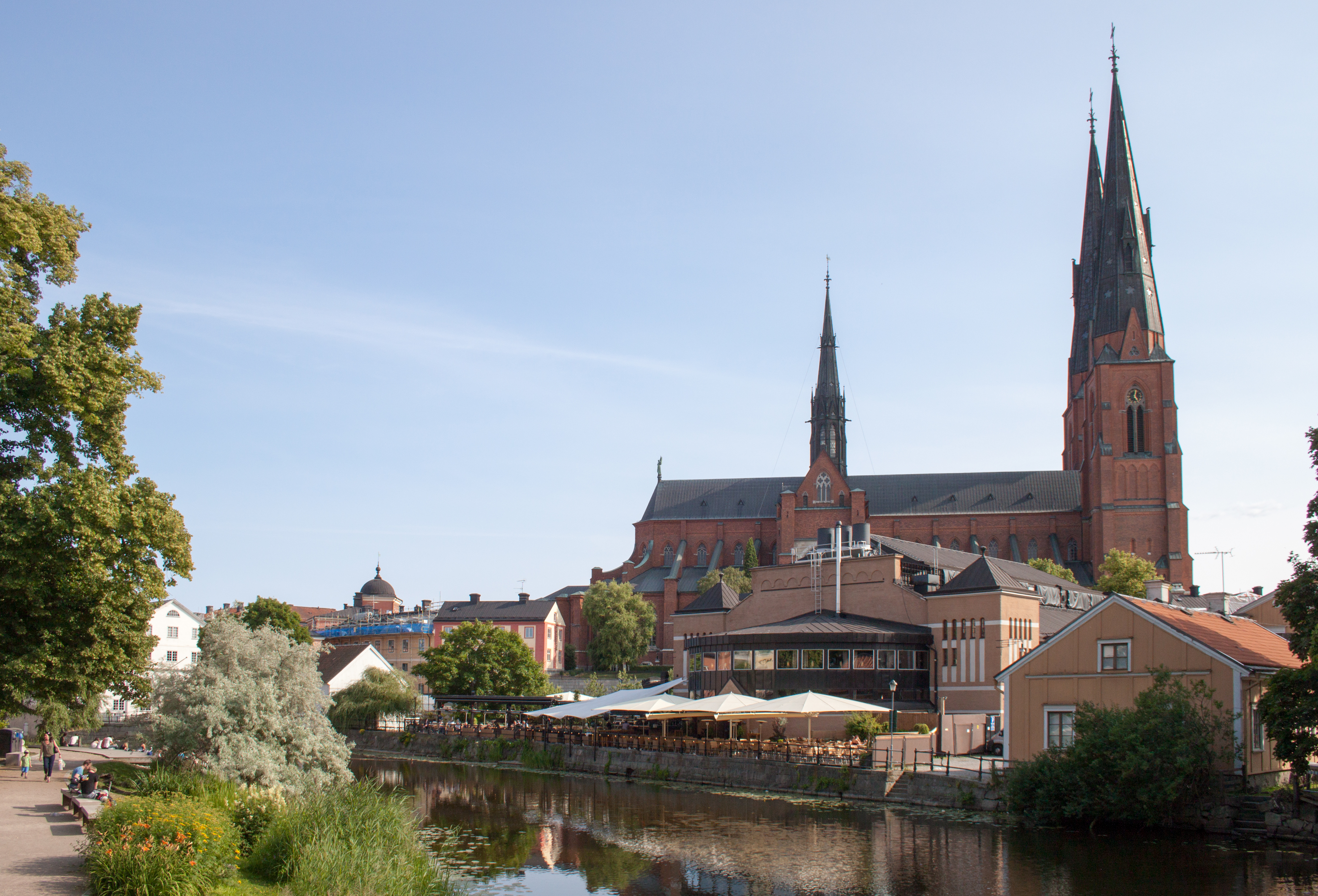
View towards Uppsala Cathedral across the river.

Fjärdingen is a neighbourhood in the inner city of Uppsala, Sweden, situated on the western banks of the river Fyris. It has been the ecclesiastical centre of Sweden since the 13th century and contains many of the historical sights and landmarks of Uppsala, notably Uppsala Cathedral on the Domberget hill, with the Archbishop's residence and Church of Sweden offices, as well as the historical university district of Sweden's oldest university, Uppsala University. Notable university buildings in the area include University Hall, Gustavianum and Carolina Rediviva, as well as most of the student nation buildings. To the south, Uppsala Castle, the University Hospital and the Stadsträdgården city park form the boundary of the historical inner city.

== Boundaries ==
Fjärdingen's natural border to the north-east is the River Fyris; to the south-east the neighbourhood is limited by Sjukhusvägen and the southern end of the city park, to the south-west by Dag Hammarskjölds väg and Kyrkogårdsgatan and to the north-west by Skolgatan.

There are several bridge crossings over to the modern city centre. Further south along the opposite side of the river, to the south-east of Fjärdingen, is Kungsängen. To the south of Uppsala Castle and the University Hospital along the river is Polacksbacken. To the south-west is Kåbo and to the north-west is Luthagen. The toponym Främre (Near) Luthagen is sometimes applied to the area between Luthagsesplanaden and Skolgatan.

In the early 19th century, the entirety of the city of Uppsala used to encompass the three inner city neighbourhoods of Fjärdingen west of the river, Svartbäcken east of the river north of Stora torget and Kungsängen to the south of Stora torget. Today, the toponyms Svartbäcken and Kungsängen are mainly used for the neighbourhoods further to the north and south of Stora torget, respectively, as the city centre around Stora torget is considered an administrative subdivision in its own right, also unofficially known as Dragarbrunn.

== Streets, places and parks ==
=== Domberget ===
Uppsala Cathedral on Domberget, the cathedral hill, is the city's main landmark since its construction in the 13th century and the seat of the Primate of the Lutheran Church of Sweden, the Archbishop of Uppsala. The remains of the medieval fortifications surrounding the cathedral have been incorporated into later buildings, partially encircling the cathedral. Across from the main western entrance to the cathedral is Gustavianum, the former main building of Uppsala University which today remains in use by the university as a lecture building and university museum. The Gustavianum cupola contains a restored baroque Anatomical theatre, the second oldest remaining of its kind in the world.

=== Drottninggatan ===
Drottninggatan is the main avenue and shopping street in the area, leading southwest from the modern city centre across River Fyris and past Fyristorg uphill to the university library, Carolina Rediviva. The final climb uphill through the park landscape to the library is commonly referred to as Carolinabacken, the site of yearly student festivities during the traditional Valborg celebrations on April 30.

=== Sysslomansgatan / Västra Ågatan ===
Sysslomansgatan/Västra Ågatan are the main north-south business streets, running parallel to the river past Fyristorg and joining at Sankt Olofsgatan. The former University Mill building presently houses a restaurant and the Upplandsmuseet regional museum. The triangular Sankt Eriks torg north of the cathedral is home to Uppsala's market hall. The southern end of Sysslomansgatan at the intersection with Sankt Olofsgatan has been the site of Uppsala's oldest café, Ofvandahls, since 1878.

=== University Park ===
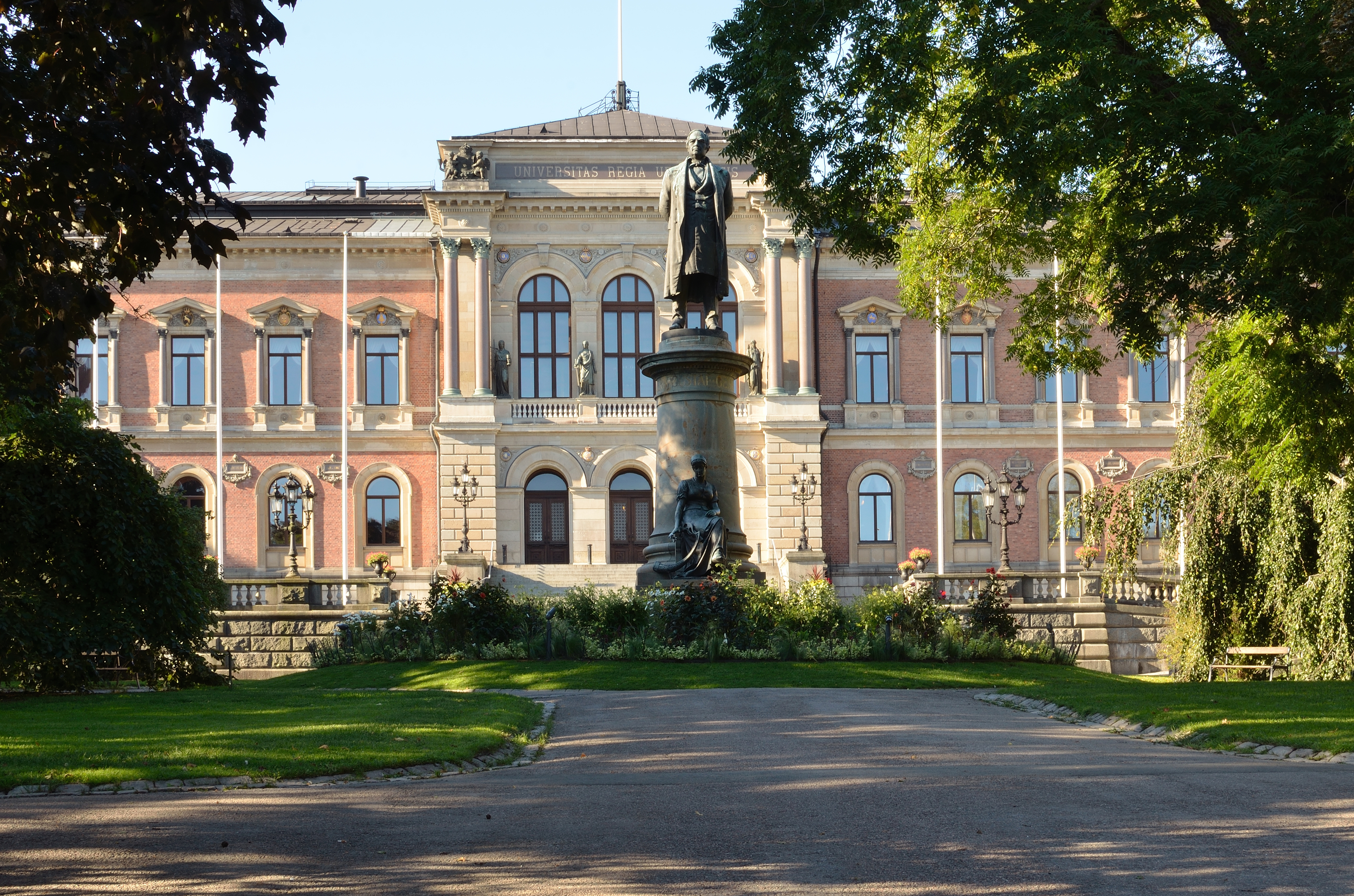
University Park, view towards University Hall and the monument to Erik Gustaf Geijer.

The University Park with the monument to Erik Gustaf Geijer is situated centrally in the neighbourhood, a short distance west of the cathedral. The main building of the university and the park was created in the 19th century on the site of the former Archbishop's Castle and the baroque horse riding courts. University Hall, Gustavianum, the Archbishop's Residence, Södermanlands-Nerikes nation, Smålands nation and the Church of Sweden office building are situated around the park. Other student societies in the area between Sankt Olofsgatan and Skolgatan north of the University Park include Uplands nation, Västmanlands-Dala nation and Kalmar nation.

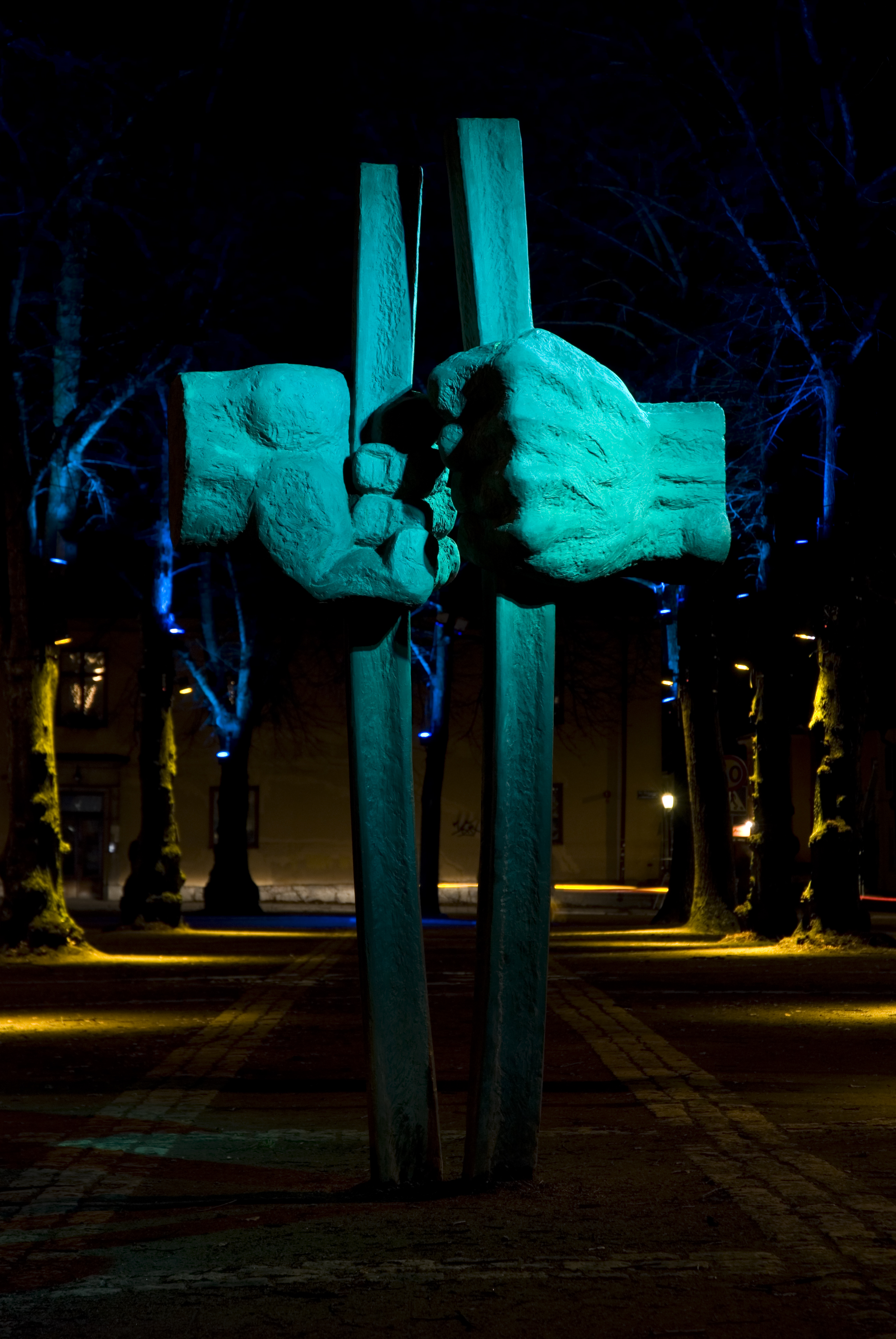
Olof Hellström's depiction of Befrielsen (English: Liberation) in "Martin Luther Kings plan" park

=== Övre Slottsgatan ===
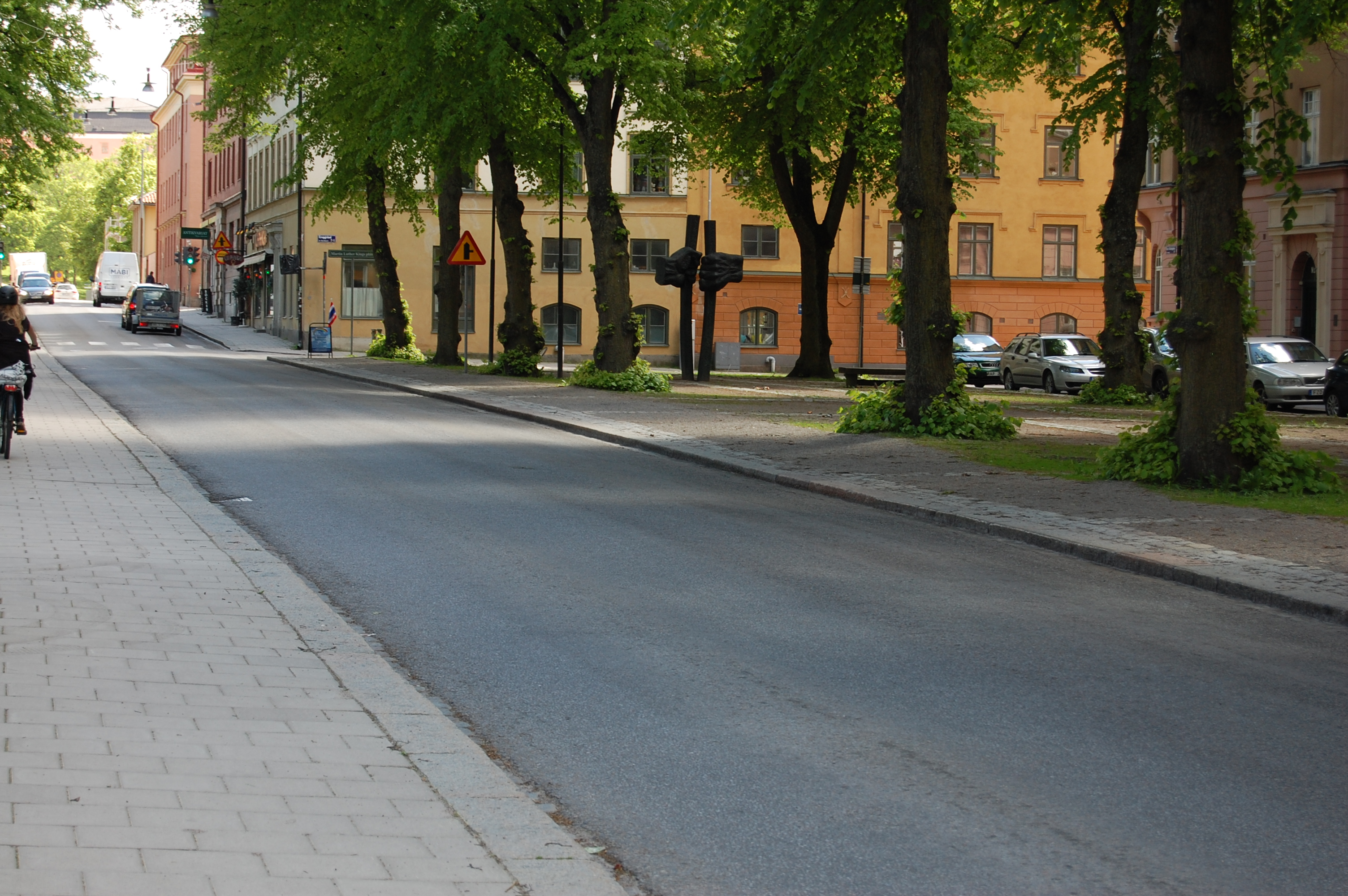
Övre Slottsgatan with treed park "Martin Luther Kings plan".

The western part of the neighbourhood is situated around Övre Slottsgatan, which contains many well-preserved 18th-century and 19th-century buildings. The street runs from Skolgatan in the northern part of the district to Carolina Rediviva. At its midpoint, adjacent to, and matching the length of, the University Hall of Uppsala University, the street widens to form a tree-shaded open space, named "Martin Luther Kings plan". The space, shaped like a church, includes the large metal art installation Befrielsen (Liberation), by local artist Olof Hellström, depicting Martin Luther King Jr.'s efforts (plan) to pull apart the bars restricting civil rights.

=== Odinslund ===
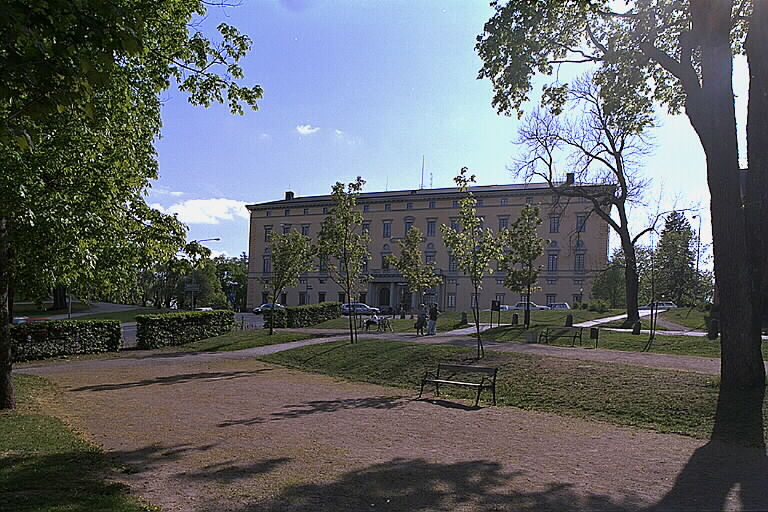
Odinslund, view towards Carolina Rediviva.

South of the cathedral, the Odinslund park connects Carolina Rediviva and the cathedral hill. In front of the entrance to the Archbishop's residence there is a small statue commemorating Nobel Peace Price Laureate and Archbishop Nathan Söderblom. The Holy Trinity Church is situated next to the park, the only other remaining medieval church in the historical inner city apart from the cathedral itself. The obelisk in front of the church was raised in 1832 during the reign of King Charles XIV John of Sweden to commemorate the 200th anniversary of the Battle of Lützen and the death of King Gustav II Adolph. The 18th-century palace south of the cathedral has been known as Dekanhuset since the 1930s. It housed the controversial State Institute for Racial Biology during the interwar period in the 1920s and 1930s. Presently it is used by the National Property Board of Sweden.

=== Valvgatan and Riddartorget ===
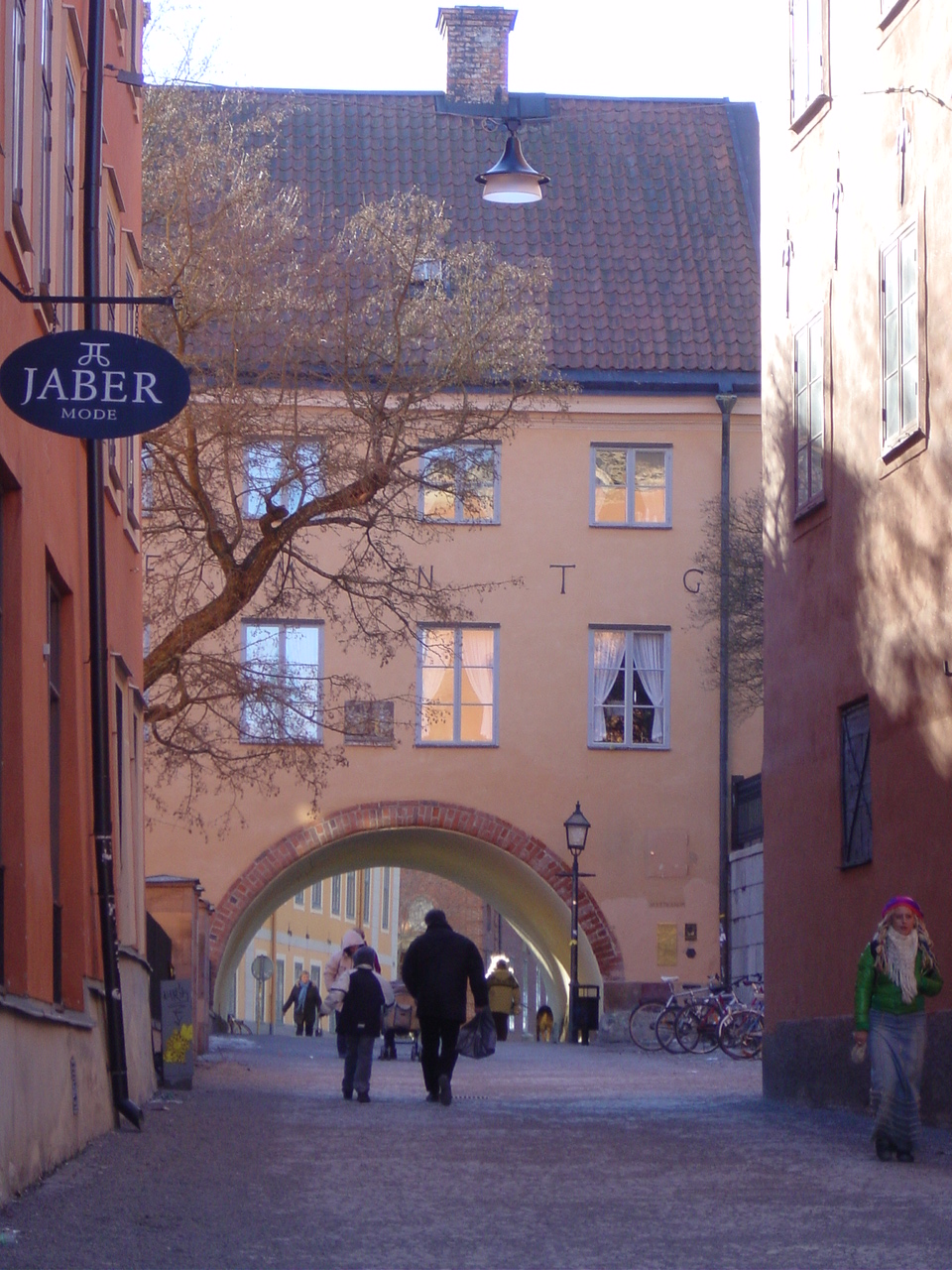
Valvgatan, view towards Skytteanum.

A short cobbled street, Valvgatan, connects the Dombron bridge and Fyristorg with Riddartorget, the open place in front of the stairs leading up to the southern cathedral entrance. A vaulted underpass leads under the historical Skytteanum building, traditionally home to the Skyttean Professor of Eloquence and Government since the 1620s. Other buildings situated in the block between Riddartorget and Drottninggatan include Värmlands nation, Oxenstierna House with the Faculty of Law and Stockholms nation.

=== Nedre Fjärdingen ===
Trädgårdsgatan leads from Riddartorget to the south through the neighbourhood Nedre (Lower) Fjärdingen. Trädgårdsgatan south of Drottninggatan is home to many student societies, among them Gästrike-Hälsinge nation, Östgöta nation, Västgöta nation and Norrlands nation. Svandammen, the swan pond below the castle, is the southern limit of the inner city; here the city park, the University Hospital grounds and Uppsala Castle on top of Kasåsen have limited urban expansion. Svandammen has been the entertainment and recreation district of Uppsala since the 19th century, with the Stadsträdgården city park and the Parksnäckan outdoor concert venue, the former student gymnastics building as well as several cafés and restaurants, among them Flustret which is the oldest nightclub in Uppsala, founded in 1842.

== In film and literature ==
As the district of Sweden's oldest university, Fjärdingen features prominently in Swedish literature. August Strindberg wrote of his recollections of university life in the short story collection From Fjerdingen and Svartbäcken (1877). The writer and poet Karin Boye lived in Fjärdingen during her undergraduate studies in Uppsala and wrote several works partially inspired by her own student experience. Gösta Knutsson's (1908–1973) children's book series about the cat Pelle No-Tail are mainly set in Fjärdingen, as are some of crime writer Kjell Eriksson's Ann Lindell novels.

Some scenes for the 2011 Hollywood adaptation of The Girl with the Dragon Tattoo were shot in Fjärdingen. Ingmar Bergman spent part of his childhood at his grandmother's apartment in Trädgårdsgatan and watched his first silent films in the Slottsbiografen cinema, which has been restored to its early 20th-century state and today is used for events. His semi-autobiographical work Fanny and Alexander was also partially shot in Fjärdingen, with the University Mill doubling as the home of the severe bishop.

== Notable people ==
- Ingmar Bergman, director, was born in Uppsala and spent part of his early years at his grandmother's apartment in Trädgårdsgatan 12.
- Dag Hammarskjöld (1905–1961), U.N. Secretary-General, lived as a child in the governor's residence of Uppsala Castle.
