= En timme för sent =

1986 Kikki Danielsson song

Song by Kikki Danielsson

from the album "Papaya Coconut"
- Language: Swedish
- Released: 1986
- Genre: pop, schlager
- Length: 3:45
- Label: Mariann
- Songwriter: Lasse Holm

"En timme för sent" is a song written by Lasse Holm, and recorded by Kikki Danielsson in 1986 on the album Papaya Coconut. The song was tested for Svensktoppen, where it stayed for totally nine weeks between 30 November 1986-1 February 1987, and peaking at number three.

Lasse Stefanz recorded the song in 2006 on the album Pickup-56. In 2007 Anne Nørdsti recorded the song on her album Livli' på låven, as "En time for sent", with lyrics in Norwegian written by herself.
