= 62 Pickup =

62 Pickup may refer to:

- "62 Pickup", a song on the 2005 album The Testament by Cormega
- "62 Pickup", an Emmy-nominated episode of The Facts of Life

== See also ==
- 52 pickup, a card game
- Pickup-56, a 2006 album by Lasse Stefanz
