= Sväng jul =

Studio album by Lasse Stefanz
- Released: 14 November 2008
- Genre: Christmas, country, dansband music
- Label: Warner Music Sweden

Lasse Stefanz chronology
Vart tog tiden vägen? (2008)	Sväng jul (2008)	En vän som du (2009)

Sväng jul is a Lasse Stefanz Christmas album released on 14 November 2008. The track, "Vitare än snö", charted at Svensktoppen for two weeks.

== Track listing ==
1. Tänk vá tomten likna pappa (Santa Looked a Lot Like Daddy)
2. Ett litet rött paket
3. Vackra jultid (Pretty Paper)
4. Tomterock
5. Mary's Boy Child
6. Run Rudolph Run
7. Vitare än snö
8. With Bells on
9. Louisiana Christmas Day
10. Ljusen i advent
11. Such a Night
12. Om jag får det jag önskat (I'll Be Home This Christmas)
13. Mjuka paket
14. Jingle My Bells

== Charts ==
Chart (2008)	Peak position
Norway (VG-lista)	39
Sweden (Sverigetopplistan)	4
