= Trouble Boys =

Trouble Boys may refer to:

- Trouble Boys (album), a 2013 album by Lasse Stefanz
- Trouble Boys: The True Story of the Replacements, a 2016 biography of the Replacements written by Bob Mehr
- "Trouble Boys", a song written by Billy Bremner using the pseudonym of Billy Murray, first recorded by Dave Edmunds
