= Truck Stop (disambiguation) =

Truck Stop may refer to:

- Truck stop, or transport cafe in the UK, a commercial facility predicated on providing fuel, parking, and often food and other services to motorists and truck drivers.
- Truck Stop (album), a 2009 album by Lasse Stefanz
- Truck Stop (band), a German country band

== See also ==
- Truck Stop Women, a 1974 film
