= Vagabond (Lasse Stefanz album) =

Studio album by Lasse Stefanz
- Released: June 27, 2007
- Genre: country, dansband music
- Label: Warner Music Sweden
- Producer: Svante Persson

Lasse Stefanz chronology
| 40 ljuva år! (2006) | Vagabond (2007) | Rallarsväng (2008) |

Vagabond is a studio album by Lasse Stefanz released on 26 June 2007. The album was awarded a Guldklaven Award in the "Album of the Year" category during the Swedish Dansband Week in Malung.

== Track listing ==
1. På egna vägar
2. Ingenting kan vara bättre
3. I varje andetag
4. Ingenting är glömt
5. Little Honda
6. Innan livet försvinner (duet with Anne Nördsti)
7. Jag kan se i dina ögon
8. It's Only Make Believe
9. Big Love
10. Tårar från himlen
11. Någon att älska
12. Vänd dig inte bort
13. Vill du bli min
14. Ta den tid du behöver

== Chart positions ==
| Chart (2007) | Peak position |
|---|---|
| Norway (VG-lista) | 3 |
| Sweden (Sverigetopplistan) | 1 |

== Certifications ==
| Region | Certification | Certified units/sales |
|---|---|---|
| Norway (IFPI Norway) | Platinum | 40,000^{*} |
| Sweden (GLF) | Platinum | 40,000^{^} |
^{*} Sales figures based on certification alone.^{^} Shipments figures based on certification alone.
