= Texas (Lasse Stefanz album) =

Studio album by Lasse Stefanz
- Released: 26 May 2010
- Genre: country, dansband music
- Label: Mariann
- Producer: Svante Persson

Lasse Stefanz chronology
De ljuva åren (2010)	Texas (2010)	Lasse Stefanz Goes 70's (2010)

Texas is a 2010 Lasse Stefanz studio album. For the fourth year in a row, the band topped the Swedish albums chart. For the album, the band was also awarded a Grammis Award in the "Dansband of the Year" category.

On 12 June 2011, the song "Skåneland" entered Svensktoppen. but was knocked out the upcoming week.

== Track listing ==
1. Skåneland
2. Himlen gråter för dig
3. Ännu blommar våra rosor (Good Year for the Roses)
4. Vita stränder
5. Hus, hund och en man
6. Du sa farväl
7. Allt är förlorat
8. Fredagskväll (with Anne Nørdsti)
9. Blue Eyes Crying in the Rain
10. En Sista Tequila
11. Ring bara ring
12. Kärleken är allt
13. Copacabana
14. Shake a Hand (with Jerry Williams)

== Charts ==
Chart (2010)	Peak position
Norway (VG-lista)	2
Sweden (Sverigetopplistan)	1

== Certifications ==
Region	Certification	Certified units/sales
Norway (IFPI Norway)	Gold	15,000^{*}
Sweden (GLF)	Platinum	40,000^{‡}
^{*} Sales figures based on certification alone.^{‡} Sales+streaming figures based on certification alone.
