= Christina Lindberg (singer) =

Swedish singer

- Born: 4 November 1968 (age 57); Helsingborg, Sweden
- Genres: Country; Dansband

Christina Lindberg (born 4 November 1968), is a Swedish country and dansband singer.

Christina has sung together with the "dansband" Lasse Stefanz and is probably most known for the song "De sista ljuva åren", which was a Svensktoppen hit from February 1989 and the upcoming 65 weeks, until September 1990.

== Christina Lindbergs orkester ==
Christina Lindbergs orkester
- Genres: Dansband
- Years active: 2000-2005
- Past members: Christina Lindberg (vocals); Calle Stenson; Pär Hogland; Tommy Källqvist; Niclas Lindström; Roger Olsson

Lindberg also had her own dansband called Christina Lindbergs orkester. The Helsingborg-based orchestra was formed in 1990 and continued until 1995. Besides backing up Lindberg, the band had several hits on the Swedish charts in their own right besides the solo hits of Christina Lindberg and toured in the Scandinavian countries and participating in radio and television.

Members were:

- Christina Lindberg - vocals
- Calle Stenson - guitar, saxophone
- Tommy Källqvist - guitar, vocals
- Roger Olsson - keyboards, accordion, vocals
- Pär Hogland - bass
- Niclas Lindström - drums

After Lindberg decided to put her musical career on hold, mainly due to her pregnancy, the band was rebranded and renamed Stensons named after the guitarist / saxophonist Calle Stenson, and continued as an all-male dansband under the new name.

== Discography ==
=== Albums ===
Solo

Year	Album	Peak positions	Certification
Year	Album	SWE	Certification
1985	Christina Lindberg	–	
1986	Nya starka vindar	–	
1997	Hemma igen	28	
2015	Back to the Roots	39	
2018	Ge dig själv en chans	33	

as part of Christina Lindbergs orkester

- 1991: Vid flodens strand
- 1992: Gyllene år
- 1993: Vind och vågor
- 1995: På begäran
- 1995: Dig ska jag älska

=== Singles ===
Solo

- 1982: "Blue Eyes Don't Make an Angel"
- 1983: "Den stora sanna kärleken" (Hasse Kvinnaböske)
- 1986: "Karneval" and "Kom snart tillbaka"
- 1987: "Night by night" (Ob Jonsson)
- 1988: "De sista ljuva åren" (duet with Lasse Stefanz)
- 1990: "Dit vägarna bär"
- 1990: "Vid flodens strand"
- 1990: "Karneval" (Nöjespatrullen)
- 1991: "Om du vet"
- 1993: "Vind och vågor" (CD single with three songs)
- 1994: "Sången till livet"

as part of Christina Lindbergs orkester

- 1990: "En dag i veckan (One Night a Week Lovers)"
- 1991: "Om du vet" / Du får tro vad du vill (Don't Tell Me what to Do)"
- 1991: "Om du vet" / Du får tro vad du vill (Don't Tell Me what to Do)" / "Skogvaktarens Lisa"
- 1992: "Gyllene år" / "I skymningen (Banks of the Ohio)" / "Sommarkänslor"
- 1993: "Vind och vågor" / "Ta och ändra dej (You Gotta Get Serious)" / "En sorgsen sång (A Sad, Sad Song)"
- 1994: "Sången till livet" / "Lika blå som då (Sweet Sixteen)"

== Svensktoppen songs ==
- 1985: "Kom snart tillbaka"
- 1989: "De sista ljuva åren" (duet with Lasse Stefanz)
- 1991: "Vid flodens strand"
- 1992: "Cheerio"
- 1992: "Gyllene år"
- 1993: "Billie Joe"
- 1993: "Vind och Vågor"
- 1993: "Ett litet hus intill vägen"
- 1994: "Under eken"
- 1994: "Sången till livet"
- 1995: "Ett liv med dig" (duet with Fernandoz)
- 1997: Det är för dig mitt hjärta slår"
- 1997: Sång för vind och regn"
- 1997: En ängel följer i ditt spår"
- 1999: "Över en kopp i vår berså" (duet with Lasse Stefanz)
- 2001: "De' e' vanliga mänskor" (duet with Rankarna)
