= Rocky Mountains (album) =

Studio album by Lasse Stefanz
- Released: 23 May 2012
- Genre: country, dansband music
- Label: Mariann

Lasse Stefanz chronology
Vår bästa country (2012)	Rocky Mountains (2012)	Kärlek & rock'n'roll (2013)

Rocky Mountains is a 2012 Lasse Stefanz studio album.

== Track listing ==
1. Sara Solsken
2. I mina skor
3. En sång från Amerika
4. Heart of Stone
5. Billy Paul
6. Om du vill tala om kärlek
7. Min rödaste ros (Autumn rose)
8. Jag far från Waco
9. Pretend
10. I gädje och sorg
11. Ett litet hur i Skåne
12. Sommar, höst, vinter och vår
13. När natten kommer
14. Oh sha na na na

== Charts ==
=== Weekly charts ===
Chart (2012)	Peak position
Norwegian Albums (VG-lista)	8
Swedish Albums (Sverigetopplistan)	1

=== Year-end charts ===
Chart (2012)	Position
Swedish Albums (Sverigetopplistan)	7
