= Else-Merete Ross =

Danish politician (1903–1976)

Else-Merete Ross (27 February 1903 - 1 March 1976) was a Danish politician and women's rights activist. She was a member of parliament from 1960 until 1973 for the Danish Social Liberal Party.

== Early life and career ==
Else-Merete Ross (born Else-Merete Helweg-Larsen) was born on 27 February 1903 in Copenhagen, and was the daughter of Albert Kristian Helweg-Larsen (1876–1952) and Berta Amalie Meincke (1881–1965). In 1923, she married Alf Ross, and in 1925 qualified to teach German and in 1928 to teach gymnastics. In 1935, she started working in Øregård Gymnasium.

== Political career ==
She was an active proponent of women's rights and shaping public policy in this area. From 1951 until 1962, she was chair of the Danish Women's National Council. She was active in the Danish Social Liberal Party and stood for parliament in the 1950s unsuccessfully. She was first elected to the Danish parliament, the Folketing, in the 1960 Danish general election, serving until 1973.

== Personal life ==
She was married to Alf Ross. She died on 1 March 1976, aged 73.
