= Papaya Coconut =

- Album cover

Studio album by Kikki Danielsson
- Released: November 1986
- Recorded: KMH Studio, Stockholm, September–October 1986
- Genre: Country pop, schlager
- Label: Mariann Grammofon AB
- Producer: Lasse Holm

Kikki Danielsson chronology
Bra vibrationer (1985)	Papaya Coconut (1986)	Min barndoms jular (1987)

Papaya Coconut is a studio album from Swedish pop singer Kikki Danielsson, released in November 1986. All the songs were written and composed by Lasse Holm and Ingela "Pling" Forsman. The song "Nashville, Tennessee" is from the 1986 television programme Kikki i Nashville. The album was on the Swedish Albums Chart around new year 1986–1987, and peaked at number 29 on the chart.

== Track listing ==
=== Side A ===
#	Title	Songwriter	Length
1.	"Hela livet med dej"	Lasse Holm	5:16
2.	"En timme för sent"	Lasse Holm	3:45
3.	"Regnet som föll i går"	Lasse Holm, Ingela Forsman	4:20
4.	"Nashville, Tennessee"	Lasse Holm, Ingela Forsman	3:05
5.	"Ensam i stan"	Lasse Holm, Ingela Forsman	4:29

=== Side B ===
#	Title	Songwriter	Length
6.	"Papaya Coconut"	Lasse Holm, Ingela Forsman	3:57
7.	"Rädda pojkar"	Lasse Holm	3:37
8.	"Låt mej få va ledsen i dag"	Lasse Holm	4:16
9.	"Nu eller aldrig"	Lasse Holm, Monica Forsberg	3:55
10.	"Du ger mej ingen orsak"	Lasse Holm	5:07

== Contributing musicians ==
- vocals: Kikki Danielsson
- drums: Klas Anderhell
- Bass: Rutger Gunnarsson, Anders Engberg
- Guitar: Lasse Wellander, Lasse Jonsson, Hasse Rosén
- Keyboards: Peter Ljung, Kjell Öhman, Lasse Holm
- Accordion: Kjell Öhman
- Wind instruments: Urban Agnas, Leif Lindvall, Erik Häusler, Joakim Milder
- Wind arrangements: Leif Lindvall
- Chorus: Vicki Benckert, Liza Öhman, Lasse Westman, Lennart Sjöholm, Lasse Holm
- Strings from Sveriges Radios Symfoniorkester.

Recorded and mixed in KMH Studio in Stockholm, Sweden in September–October 1986.

- Technicians: Åke Groho
- Cover design: Fri Reklam
- Fotography: Michael Engström
- Production: KM Records
- Arrangement: Lennart Sjöholm

== Svensktoppen ==
Three of the songs from this album were tested on the Swedish hitlist Svensktoppen.

- The song "Rädda pojkar" charted at Svensktoppen for four weeks between 29 June–21 September 1986 (including the summer break), peaking at 5th position.
- The song "En timme försent" charted at Svensktoppen for nine weeks between 30 November 1986 – 1 February 1987, peaking at third position.-1987,
- The song "Papaya Coconut" was on Svensktoppen for 12 weeks between 11 January–29 March 1987, peaking at first position.

== Album cover ==
One side of the inner covers advertised for Danielsson's holiday village Orfa, which is located between Bollnäs and Ljusdal, and a discount coupon authorizing 10% discount for cottage renting during 1987.

== Charts ==
Chart (1986–1987)	Peak position
Swedish Albums (Sverigetopplistan)	29
