= Axel Hägerström =

Swedish philosopher

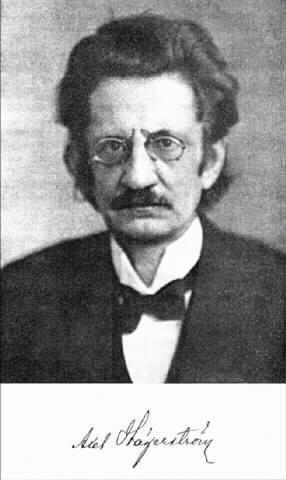
Axel Hägerström

Axel Anders Theodor Hägerström (6 September 1868 – 7 July 1939) was a Swedish philosopher.

Born in Vireda, Jönköping County, Sweden, he was the son of a Church of Sweden pastor. As student at Uppsala University, he gave up theology for a career in philosophy. Teaching there from 1893 until his retirement in 1933, he attacked the then dominant philosophical idealism of the followers of Christopher Jacob Boström (1797-1866). He is best known as a founder of the (quasi-) positivistic Uppsala school of philosophy—the Swedish counterpart of the Anglo-American Analytical Philosophy as well as of the Logical Positivism of the Vienna Circle—and as the founder of the Scandinavian legal realism movement.

Some of his work was published by the Muirhead Library of Philosophy.

He was Inspektor of the Östgöta nation from 1925 to his retirement in 1933. He died in Uppsala.

== Meta-ethics ==
In 1911, Hägerström published an essay titled "On the Truth of Moral Propositions", in which he proposed several meta-ethical views that would later become dominant meta-ethical subjects in Analytic Philosophy, particularly, Moral nihilism (or "Moral Error Theory"), Emotivism, and other forms of Non-Cognitivism (comparing, for instance, moral sentences to sentences in the Optative mood).

== Contribution to legal understanding ==
The jurisprudential camp of legal realism, broadly speaking, consists of those scholars who strictly reject the concept of natural law and who believe that legal concepts, terminology and values should be based on experience, observation and experimentation and are thus, ‘real’.

Hägerström is considered to be the founding father of the Scandinavian school of legal realism. His disciples Karl Olivecrona, Alf Ross and Anders Vilhelm Lundstedt all take a similar basic view to Hägerström in their opinions on the language of Western law. Due to their verdict on natural law, they also reject the concept of human rights.

Hägerström, who had been influenced by the Neo-Kantianism of the Marburg school, rejected metaphysics in their entirety. His motto was: "Praeterea censeo metaphysicam esse delendam", paraphrasing Cato's famous "delenda Carthago". His opinion was that words such as ‘right’ and ‘duty’ were basically meaningless as they could not be scientifically verified or proven. They may have influence or be able to direct a person who obtains such a right or duty but ultimately, if they could not stand up to a factual test, they were mere fantasies. Similarly, Hägerström regarded all value judgements as mere emotional expressions using the form of judgements without being judgments in the proper sense of the word. This position caused Hägerström's critics to characterize his philosophy as "value nihilism" - a label that was invented by journalists and later endorsed by some of Hägerström's less orthodox followers, mainly Ingemar Hedenius.

Hägerström attacked various words and legal concepts in his writings so as to prove they could not stand up to scientific application.

== Publications ==
- Aristoteles etiska grundtankar och deras teoretiska förutsättningar, Uppsala, Akamemiska boktrykeriet, E. Berling, 1893
- 'Axel Hägerström', Filosofiskt lexikon, ed Alfred Ahlberg, Natur & Kultur, Third edition, 1951
- Philosophy and Religion, (1964), English translation by Robert T. Sandin
- Inquiries into the Nature of Law and Morals, Stockholm: Almqvist & Wiksell, ed. Karl Olivecrona, transl. C. D. Broad.
