= Papaya Coconut (song) =

Song by Kikki Danielsson

from the album Papaya Coconut
- Language: Swedish
- Released: 1986
- Genre: pop, schlager
- Label: Mariann
- Songwriter: Lasse Holm
- Composer: Ingela Forsman
- Producers: Ingela Forsman, Lasse Holm

"Papaya Coconut" is a song, written by Ingela Forsman and Lasse Holm. It was recorded with lyrics in Swedish by Kikki Danielsson on her 1986 album Papaya Coconut, and is one of her most famous recordings. The lyrics are about travelling from the Earth's colder places to its hotter places. The song was a Svensktoppen #1 hit, being at the chart for 12 weeks from 11 January to 29 March 1987.

Kikki Danielsson's original recording of the song also appears in the 2014 film The Anderssons Rock the Mountains.

== Papaya Coconut (Come Along) ==
In 1998 Kikki Danielsson recorded the song together with Dr. Alban, with lyrics in English written by Dr. Alban, and released it on the single Dr. Alban vs. Kikki Danielsson - Papaya Coconut (Come Along), which was released on 21 September 1998. The music was re-arranged from classical Svensktoppen pop to Eurodance, and for that reason more like a Dr. Alban song than a Kikki Danielsson song. The single peaked at #22 at the Swedish singles chart. This version was also included as the last track on the 1999 Kikki Danielssons orkester album Dagar som kommer och går.

=== Track listing: Papaya Coconut (Come Along) ===
1. Papaya Coconut (Radio Edit)
2. Papaya Coconut (Extended Mix)
3. Papaya Coconut (PN's Dub Doctor Mix)
4. Come Along

== Charts ==
Chart (1998)	Peak
Sweden	22

== Papaya Coconut (Come Along) chart performance ==
Sweden Top 60
Week	1 October 1998	8 October 1998	15 October 1998	22 October 1998	29 October 1998	5 November 1998	12 November 1998	19 November 1998	26 November 1998	3 December 1998	10 December 1998	17 December 1998
Position	28	32	22	24	32	30	40	48	60	59	40	40

== Other recordings ==
- Swedish music- and entertainer group Lars Vegas trio covered the song on their 1993 CD EP Kikki Resque - fem helt vanliga killar tolkar Kikki Danielsson.
- Swedish Bitpop artist Goto80 covered the song on his 2001 EP "Papaya EP".
- The song was performed by Larz-Kristerz at Dansbandskampen in 2008. The band also covered the song on the 2009 album Hem till dig.
- Danish singer Birthe Kjær recorded a Danish version "I en stribet liggestol".
