= Södermanlands-Nerikes nation =

Student nation of Uppsala University

Coordinates: 59°51′32″N 17°37′50″E

- Uppsala University
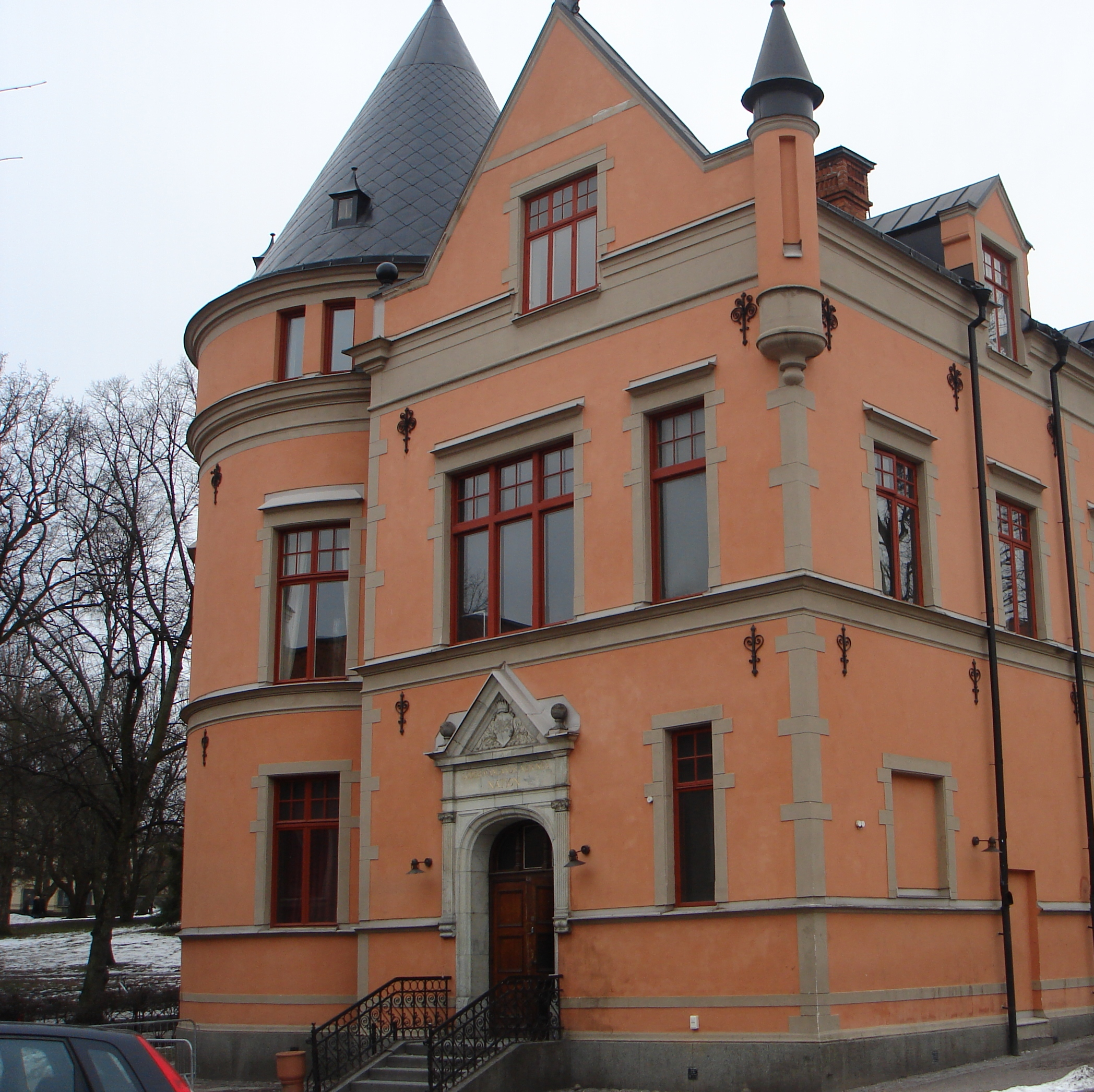
- Location: S:t Olofsg. 16; 753 12 Uppsala; Sweden
- Latin name: Natio Sudermanno-Nericia
- Abbreviation: Snerikes
- Established: 1595
- Inspektor: Per Ström
- Membership: approx. 10000
- Website: www.snerikes.se

Södermanlands-Nerikes Nation (usually called Snerikes) is one of the 13 student nations of Uppsala University. The nation claims its founding to be in 1595 when the original Södermanlands nation was founded, this nation merged with the Nerikes nation in 1805 to form the current nation. Though at the turn of the 20th century its numbers were as low as 100 members, there are currently around 10,000 students as members.

Snerikes is unique amongst student nations in being not entirely open to all students. Swedes must be from or have close family relations to the Snerikes catchment area to join. This requirement is waived for foreign students; Snerikes is in fact a popular nation for foreign students.

== Buildings ==
The nation currently owns several properties in the Rosendal city block in the historic Fjärdingen quarter west of the river in central Uppsala, as well as in the Triangeln block in the Kungsgärdet area. The Rosendal city block contains the main nation building, several offices, student housing, rental apartments and business spaces, while Triangeln solely consists of student housing. Members of Snerikes who are active students are eligible for renting student rooms and apartments for the duration of their studies. In total there are 383 rooms and 85 apartments.

=== Buildings in the Rosendal city block ===
- The Snerikes nation house with the characteristic round tower, built 1896–1897 after 80 years of planning and fund raising. The architect, Gerdt Hallberg, had earlier been employed by the firm responsible for the design of the Riksdag building in Stockholm and designed the nation house in neo-renaissance style. Some of the rooms are named for cities in Södermanland and Närke. The building contains a restaurant and rooms for the nation's social events.
- Stavenowska huset in Rundelsgränd 1, library, reading rooms and student housing, with a book collection founded in the 17th century. Built in 1855 from Johan Otto Larsson's design and named after the historian Ludvig Stavenow, Rector Magnificus of Uppsala University 1918–1929. Stavenow bought the house in 1918. It underwent a major renovation in 1998.
- Engelska villan in Rundelsgränd 3, designed by Axel Bergman for the S:t Eriks clay goods factory, built 1912–13. Contains housing for former students of the nation.
- Backmanska huset, Rundelsgränd 3B, the oldest wooden house in Uppsala, built in the 1620s. The first owner was librarian Johannes Bureus. It belonged to various high officials until the 1900s and was acquired in 1956 by Snerikes. It was one of few surviving wooden structures in the area after the great fire of 1809 and became a protected building in 1993. After a renovation in 1995–96 it presently contains the Snerikes housing office.
- Rosendals matsalar, Rundelsgränd 3C. Originally built in 1792, destroyed in the great fire of 1809 and rebuilt in 1819. Acquired by the nation in 1966. Renovated in 2010 and presently occupied by student housing and commercial spaces.
- S:t Johannesgatan 12, housing for former students designed in the 1920s by Simon Lindsjö and finished during the early 1930s.
- Arkadien, S:t Larsgatan 6B, named for Arcadia, possibly inspired by the ground floor arcade, built in 1937 and designed in functionalist style by Eskil Sundahl and Artur von Schmalensee. There are 60 student rooms in the building. It was one of the first Swedish similar buildings to contain an individual bathroom for every student room, and has a view towards Uppsala Cathedral.
- Gula villan, S:t Larsgatan 6A, built in 1847 and acquired 1927 from P A Geijer's estate. Renovated in 2012 and presently occupied by student housing.
- Brundisium, S:t Larsgatan 4, named for Brindisi, built in the 19th century. The building has been remodeled during 2020, with the bottom floor now housing a large room for social activities. The middle floor is presently the Curator's office. The rooms of the building are named for palaces and manor houses in Södermanland and Närke: Gripsholmrummet, Yxtaholmrummet, Göksholmrummet, Tullgarnrummet and Stjernsundrummet.
- Gula Paviljongen, built in 1994.

=== Triangeln ===
The Triangeln block, named for its triangular shape, was built in the Kungsgärdet area west of the University 1958–1960 and subsequently became part of the traditional student housing areas of Uppsala. There are 298 rooms and 79 apartments, with a central park space.

== Inspektors ==
Södermanlands nation

- Petrus Liung 1663–1679
- Mattias Steuchius 1679–1683
- Gustavus Peringer Liljeblad 1683–1695
- Andreas Drossander 1695–1696
- Ericus Liung 1696–1703
- Daniel Lundius 1703–1729
- Ericus Melander 1729–1745
- Laurentius Hydrén 1745–1789
- Johan Adam Tingstadius 1789–1805

Nerikes nation

- Carolus Lithman 1663–1686
- Laurentius Norrman 1686–1703
- Johannes Edsbergius 1703–1712
- Daniel Lundius 1712–1729
- Samuel Klingenstierna 1730–1756
- Johan Gottschalk Wallerius 1756–1768
- Johan Ihre 1768–1780
- Per Niklas Christiernin 1780–1799
- Erik Götlin 1799–1805

Södermanlands-Nerikes nation

- Erik Götlin 1805–1812
- Andreas Hultén 1812–1831
- Lars Peter Walmstedt 1831–1845
- Olof Wingqvist 1845–1861
- Fredrik Ferdinand Carlson 1861–1863
- Lars Edvard Walmstedt 1863–1877
- Carl Gustaf Malmström 1877–1878
- Herman Schultz 1878–1882
- Ernst Viktor Nordling 1882–1884
- Olof Hammarsten 1884–1906
- Per Persson 1906–1922
- Rutger Sernander 1922–1931
- Jöran Sahlgren 1931–1941
- Dick Helander 1942–1952
- Stig Claesson 1953–1965
- Sune Carlsson 1966–1974
- Gunnar Wijkman 1974–1980
- Tom Saldeen 1980–1986
- Leif Lewin 1986–2007
- Lennart Persson 2007–2011
- Johan Åqvist 2011–2020
- Per Ström 2020–
