= Ofvandahls =

Cafe and patisserie

Coordinates: 59°51′34.387″N 17°37′54.563″E

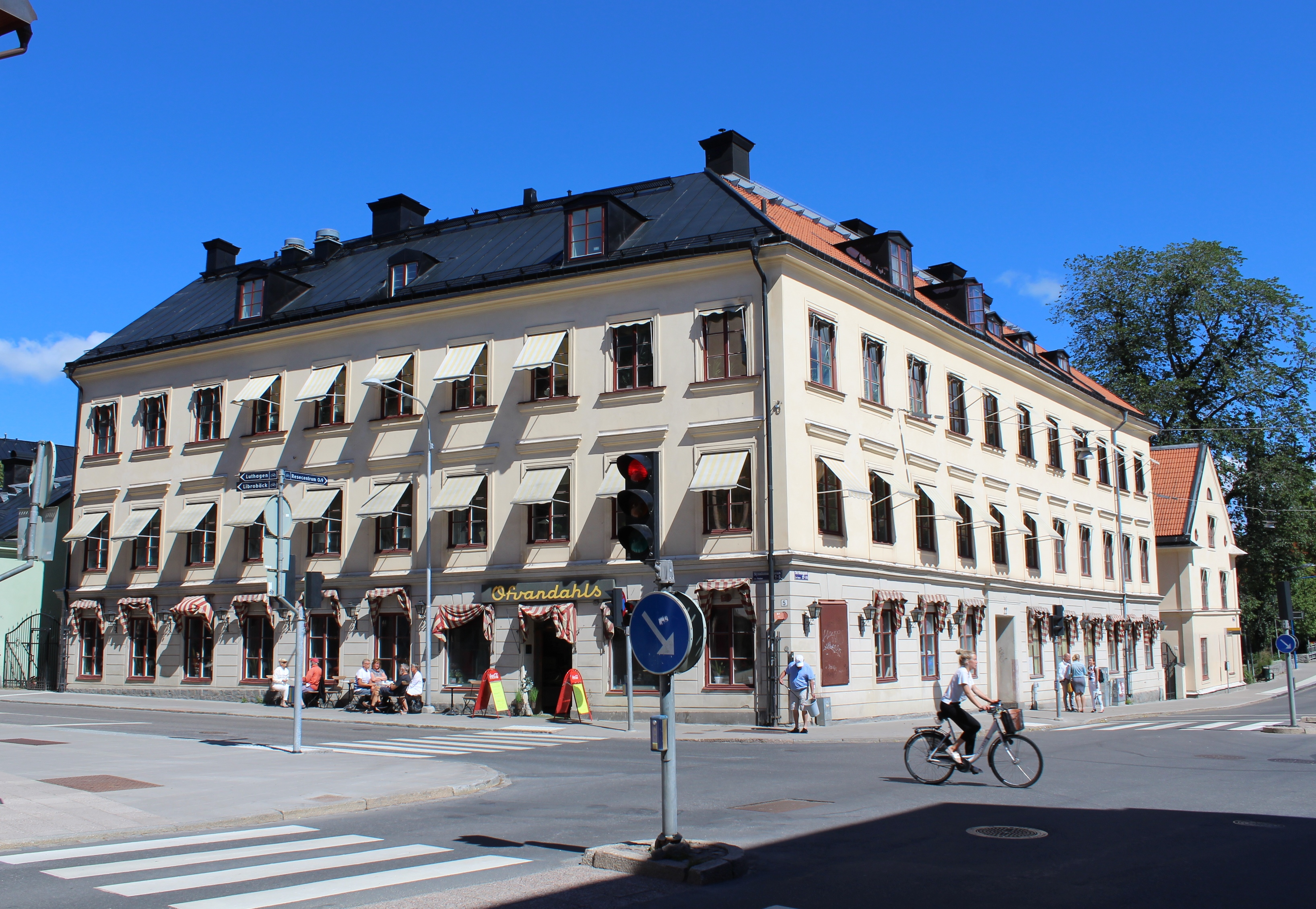
Ofvandahls

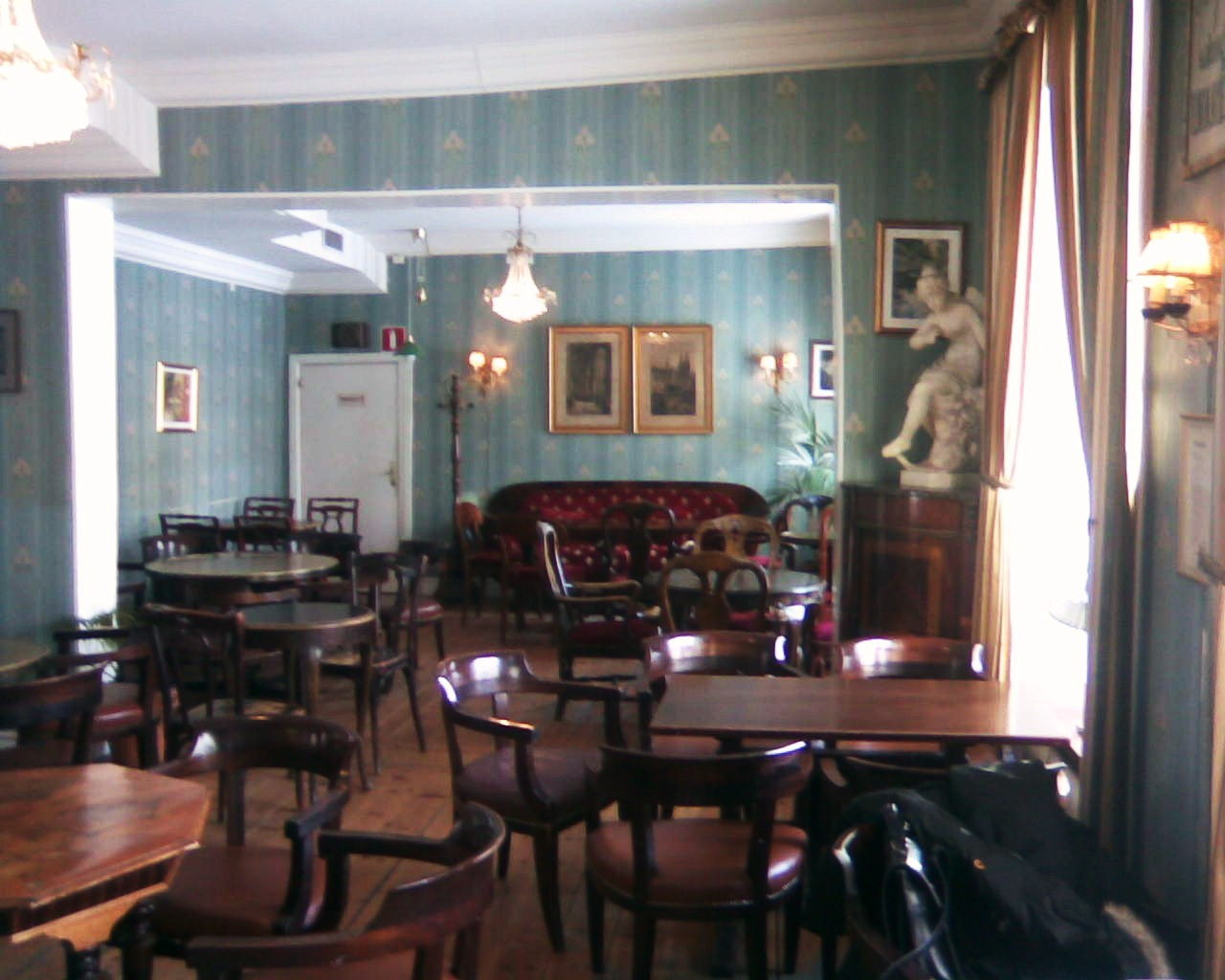
Interior

Ofvandahls is the oldest still operating café and konditori in Uppsala, Sweden, founded as Café Dahlia in 1878 by Erik Ofvandahl (1848–1949). It still occupies the original suite of rooms in a (now) listed 19th-century building at the intersection of Sysslomansgatan and Sankt Olofsgatan, in the historical Fjärdingen inner city district. Ofvandahls held the distinction of Purveyor to the Swedish Royal Court for a long time and the café remained in the Ofvandahl family, being run by his daughters Ragnhild and Anna until 1971.

== Specialities ==
Linnébakelsen, a turquoise medallion with Carl von Linné's profile in marzipan, is one of the confectionery's most famous creations. The patisserie also serves sandwiches and simple lunches and sells coffee, cakes, bread and confectionery to take away.

== Literary associations ==
Erik Ofvandahl was originally from the village of Ovandal near Borlänge. He took the name of his village as his surname in 1901, renaming the café Ofvandahls. He was an amateur poet and poetry enthusiast much beloved by students of neighbouring Uppsala University for his whimsical poems. The café still houses occasional poetry reading events. Even though studying at the table is formally prohibited by the management, Ofvandahls remains especially popular with students and alumni of the university.

Many local writers such as Hjalmar Bergman, Gustaf Fröding and Karin Boye have been regulars at the café, as well as the artist-prince Eugen, Duke of Närke.

It also features in the lyrics of local songwriters Owe Thörnqvist (Ett litet rött paket) and Ulf Peder Olrog (På Ofvandahls konditori).
