= Stensons =

Stenspns
- Origin: Skåne, Sweden
- Genres: Dansband
- Years active: 2005-present
- Label: Atenzia Records
- Members: Kalle Stenson; Pär Hogland; John Martin Bengtsson; Tommy Kjellqvist; Niclas Lindström; Roger Olsson
- Website: www.stensons.se

Stensons is a Swedish dansband from Skåne that started performing as an independent all-male band starting 2005.

From 2000 to 2005, the band had been working as a backup musical band for Swedish singer Christina Lindberg under the name Christina Lindbergs orkester in addition to releasing albums in their own name and touring various Scandinavian countries. When Lindberg became pregnant and wanted to put her musical career on hold, the band decided to continue under the new name Stensons, after Kalle Stenson, the guitarist / saxophonist of the band.

== Members ==
- Kalle Stenson - guitar, saxophone
- Pär Hogland - bass
- Niclas Lindström - drums
- Tommy Kjellqvist - vocals, guitar
- Roger Olsson - keyboards, accordion, vocals
- John Martin Bengtsson - vocals

== Discography ==
=== Albums ===
Year	Album	Peak positions	Certification
Year	Album	SWE	Certification
2004	Stunder att älska	–	
2011	Du kommer väl på festen	–	
2013	Jag vill dela varje dag med dig	11	
