= Honky Tonk Rebels =

Studio album by Lasse Stefanz
- Released: 18 June 2014
- Genre: country, dansband music
- Label: Mariann Grammofon Mariann

Lasse Stefanz chronology
Lasse Stefanz stora julparty (2013)	Honky Tonk Rebels (2014)	Whiskey Barrel (2015)

Honky Tonk Rebels is a 2014 Lasse Stefanz studio album, released on 18 June 2014. It topped the Swedish albums chart.

== Track listing ==
1. Var rädd om kärleken
2. Länge leve honky tonk
3. Jag skulle ge vad som helst
4. Om jag gick på vatten
5. Vem vet
6. Brevet från kolonien (Hello Muddah, Hello Fadduh, duet with Jack Vreeswijk)
7. Baton rouge
8. Om jag kommer om natten
9. Jag är strandad på Jamaica
10. Älska glömma och förlåta
11. Reckless Heart
12. Don't Mess with My Toot-Toot
13. Ensam och svag
14. När mitt hjärta slutat slå

== Charts ==
=== Weekly charts ===
Chart (2014)	Peak position
Norwegian Albums (VG-lista)	5
Swedish Albums (Sverigetopplistan)	1

=== Year-end charts ===
Chart (2014)	Position
Swedish Albums (Sverigetopplistan)	9

== Certifications ==
Region	Certification	Certified units/sales
Sweden (GLF)	Platinum	40,000^{‡}
^{‡} Sales+streaming figures based on certification alone.
