= Rallarsväng =

Studio album by Lasse Stefanz
- Released: 28 May 2008
- Genre: country, dansband music
- Label: Warner Music Sweden

Lasse Stefanz chronology
Vagabond (2007)	Rallarsväng (2008)	Vart tog tiden vägen? (2008)

Rallarsväng is a studio album by Lasse Stefanz, released on 28 May 2008. For the album, the band was awarded a Grammis Award in the "Schlager-dansband of the year" category. On 12 July 2009, the album was awarded a Guldklaven Award in the "Album of the year" category during the Swedish Dansband Week in Malung.

== Track listing ==
1. Till Österlen
2. Hemmahamn
3. En runda i baren (duet with Plura Jonsson)
4. Innan allt är för sent
5. Hållplats 31
6. He'll Have to go
7. Kalla det drömmar om du vill
8. När skuggorna faller
9. Angel Lee
10. Hem igen
11. Slöseri med kärlek
12. Ensam weekend
13. Mot lugnare vatten
14. Jag lever för livet
15. En runda i baren (Danish language-duet with Flemming "Bamse" Jørgensen)

== Charts ==
Chart performance for Rallarsväng
Chart (2008)	Peak position
Norwegian Albums (VG-lista)	1
Swedish Albums (Sverigetopplistan)	1

== Certifications ==
Region	Certification	Certified units/sales
Norway (IFPI Norway)	Gold	15,000^{*}
Sweden (GLF)	Gold	20,000^{^}
^{*} Sales figures based on certification alone.^{^} Shipments figures based on certification alone.
