= Pickup-56 =

Studio album by Lasse Stefanz
- Released: 10 May 2006
- Genre: Country, dansband
- Label: Frituna
- Producer: Rutger Gunnarsson

Lasse Stefanz chronology
Röd Chevrolet (2004)	Pickup-56 (2006)	40 ljuva år! (2006)

Professional ratings
Review scores
Source	Rating
Helgeland Arbeiderblad	5/6 stars

Pickup-56 is an album by Swedish dansband Lasse Stefanz released on 10 May 2006.

== Track listing ==
1. När countryn kom till Skåne
2. Bring it on Home to Me
3. Mot en horisont
4. När inte himlen är så blå
5. Pauline
6. Har du glömt
7. Kärleken är blind
8. En timme försent
9. More than I Can Say
10. Klockorna har stannat
11. Det kanske är ditt hjärtas fel
12. Drömmar av silver
13. Jag bara älskar dig
14. Kom tillbaks Maria
15. Vad du än tänker

== Charts ==
=== Weekly charts ===
Chart (2006)	Peak position
Norwegian Albums (VG-lista)	6
Swedish Albums (Sverigetopplistan)	2

=== Year-end charts ===
Chart (2006)	Position
Swedish Albums (Sverigetopplistan)	91
