= Lasse Stefanz Goes 70's =

Studio album by Lasse Stefanz
- Released: 15 December 2010
- Genre: country, dansband music
- Label: Mariann

Lasse Stefanz chronology
Texas (2010)	Lasse Stefanz Goes 70's (2010)	Cuba Libre (2010)

Lasse Stefanz Goes 70's is a 2010 Lasse Stefanz studio album, and a tribute to music of the 1970s, the decade the band climbed towards the charts. All songs are performed in English, and are duets performed together with different artists.

== Track listing ==
#	Title	Writer
1.	"Soul Shake" (with Monia Sjöström)	
2.	"The Air that I Breathe" (with Mikael Rickfors)	
3.	"A Love Worth Waiting for" (with Roland Järverup, Rolandz)	
4.	"She's in Love with You" (with Erica Sjöström, Drifters)	
5.	"My Broken Souvenirs" (with Thorleif Torstensson, Thorleifs)	
6.	"Sweet Little Rock'n'Roller" (with Stefan Jonasson, The Playtones)	
7.	"Don't Forget to Remember Me" (with Jessica Andersson)	Barry Gibb, Maurice Gibb
8.	"Skydiver" (with Hasse Carlsson, Flamingokvintetten)	
9.	"I'd Love You to Want Me" (with Stefan Nykvist & Peter Larsson, Larz-Kristerz)	
10.	"I've Found My Freedom" (with Lotta Engberg)	
11.	"Yellow River" (with Tony Ljungström, Black Jack)	
12.	"Honey Ko" (with Henrik Strömberg, Scotts)	

== Chart positions ==
Chart (2010–2011)	Peak position
Sweden (Sverigetopplistan)	2

== Certifications ==
Region	Certification	Certified units/sales
Sweden (GLF)	Gold	20,000^{‡}
^{‡} Sales+streaming figures based on certification alone.
