= I tomteverkstan =

Studio album by Lasse Stefanz
- Released: 19 November 2001
- Recorded: 1996–2001
- Genre: Country, Christmas, dansband
- Length: 39.29
- Label: Frituna

Lasse Stefanz chronology
Emelie (2001)	I tomteverkstan (2001)	Mi vida loca (2002)

I tomteverkstan, released on 19 November 2001, is a Christmas album from Swedish "dansband" Lasse Stefanz. It was released to CD and cassette tape The song "Ute på vischan" was on Svensktoppen from December 2001 to January 2002.

== Track listing ==
1. Jag vill hem till julen
2. Blue Christmas
3. Ett rött paket med vita snören om
4. Lonely this Christmas
5. Ute på vischan
6. Rocking around the Christmas Tree
7. Knallejul
8. A Very Merry Rocking Good Christmas
9. Vår vackra vita vintervärld
10. Rolf ren
11. Silent Night
12. Juletid
13. Tänd ett ljus
14. Utan dej så blir det ingen jul
