= Gustaf Svanberg =

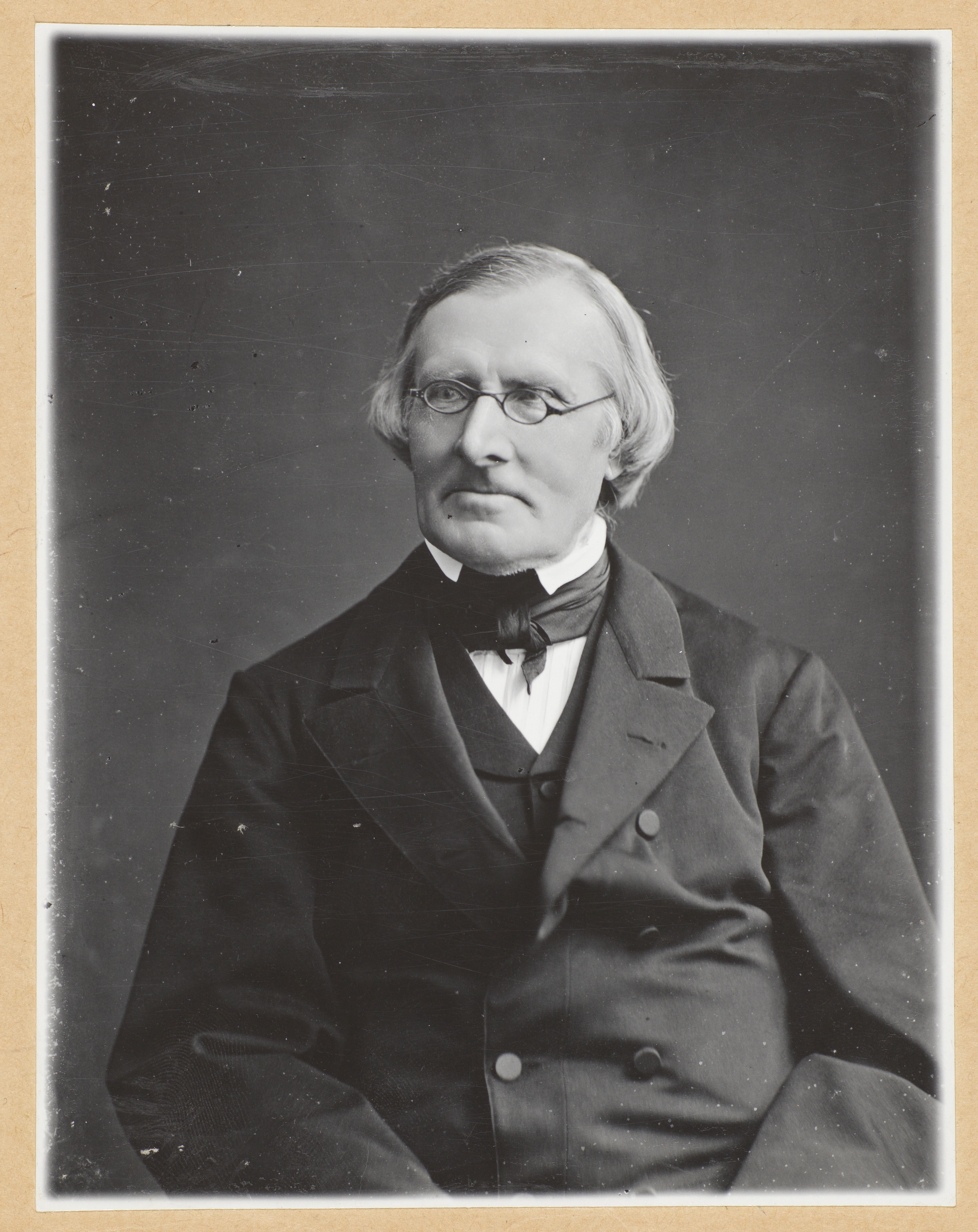
Svanberg c. 1870s

Gustaf Svanberg (22 January 1802 – 21 November 1882) was a Swedish astronomer. He was a professor of astronomy at Uppsala University from 1842 to 1875, and prefect of the university's observatory between 1825 and 1878. During his tenure, Svanberg traveled to Germany to meet prominent astronomers of the time. After returning from the journey, he undertook efforts to improve the astronomical facilities at Uppsala. This included establishing geomagnetic research facilities to cooperate with Carl Friedrich Gauss, and building a new observatory in Uppsala, a project which was subject to political controversy at the time. The minor asteroid 8871 Svanberg is named after him.

== Early life and education ==
Svanberg was born on 22 January 1802 in Botilsäter, Värmland, to parents Pehr Svanberg and Maria Odén. He attended primary school in Söderköping and secondary school in Linköping. Svanberg began studying at Uppsala University in 1819, achieving graduate and undergraduate degrees, and finally a doctorate in astronomy in 1825.

== Career ==
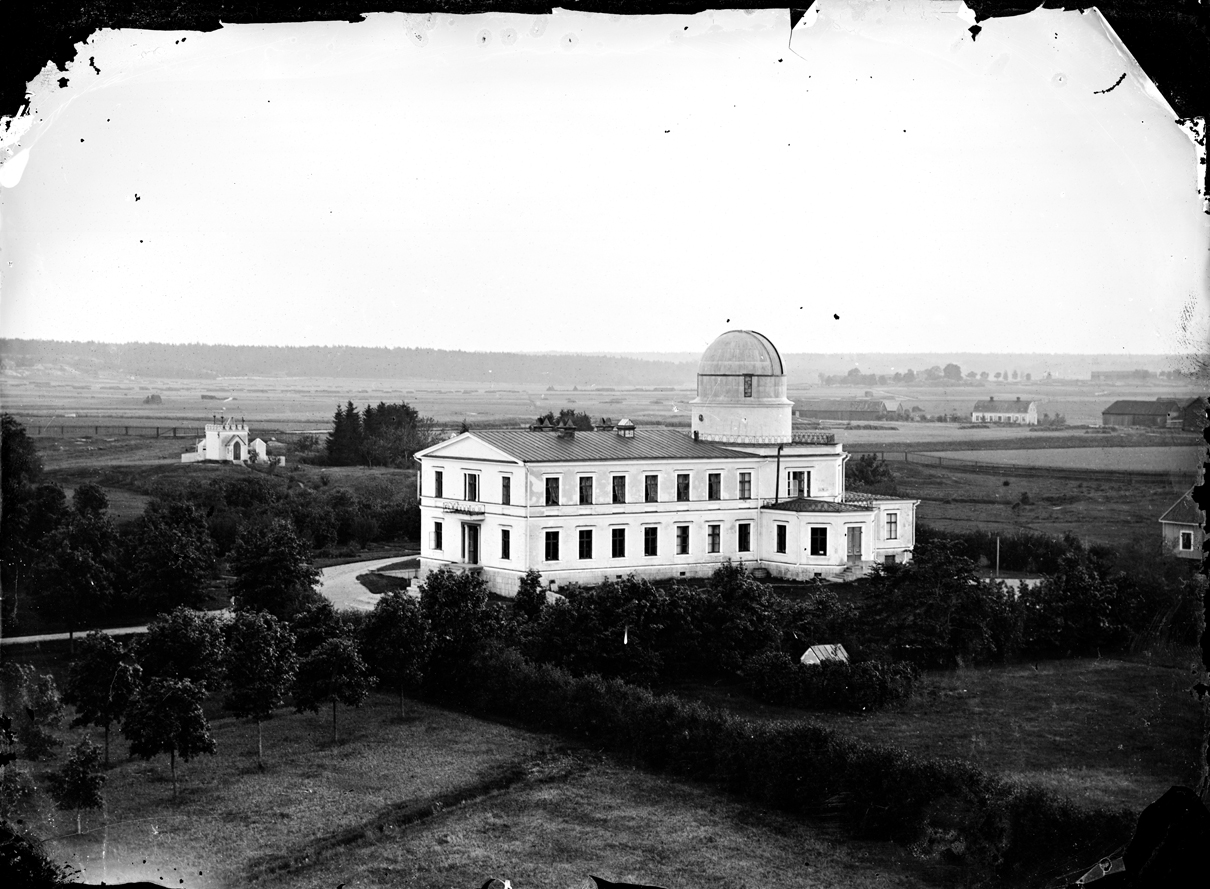
The observatory in Uppsala

The year of his graduation in 1825, Svanberg was appointed docent of astronomy, as well as observator and thus prefect of the observatory. After his appointment, Svanberg spent time at Stockholm University to obtain more modern knowledge of astronomy than was available in Uppsala at the time. In 1829, his position as observator was made permanent, and in 1833, Svanberg embarked on a journey to Germany to acquire further knowledge and connect with connect astronomers of the time. Svanberg toured Altona; Göttingen, where he studied the Earth's magnetic field under Gauss and William Eduard Weber; Munich; Vienna; Berlin; and Hanover. He returned to Uppsala in 1835.

After returning from this trip, Svanberg established one of the first magnetometer observatories in Uppsala. From 1836 onwards measurements were taken there and relayed to a network of scientists coordinates by Gauss, to map the Earth's magnetic field. In 1842 he was named professor of astronomy at Uppsala.

After the geomagnetic facility was completed, Svanberg lobbied to have a more modern astronomical observatory built in Uppsala. The proposal faced considerable opposition on funding grounds, both from within the university and on a national level. After debates in the Riksdag between 1840 and 1841, national funding was secured for the construction of the observatory, which began in 1844.

Svanberg resigned from his position as professor in 1875. He remained observator until 1878, and died in Uppsala on 21 November 1882.
