= Trouble Boys (album) =

Studio album by Lasse Stefanz
- Released: 19 June 2013
- Recorded: 2013
- Genre: Dansband
- Label: Mariann

Lasse Stefanz chronology
Kärlek & rock'n'roll (2013)	Trouble Boys (2013)	Lasse Stefanz stora julparty (2013)

Trouble Boys is a 2013 studio album by the Swedish dansband Lasse Stefanz. It was released on 19 June 2013, and topped the Sverigetopplistan, the official Swedish Albums Chart on 28 June 2013.

The album stayed for seven weeks at number 1 position making it one of the most successful Swedish albums of 2013 alongside Mando Diao's Infruset and Gyllene Tider's Dags att tänka på refrängen.

It was also released in Norway where it reached number 2 on the Norwegian VG-lista official albums chart.

== Track listing ==
1. När hon glömt
2. Trouble Boys
3. Väl bevarat och gömt
4. Riktig kärlek
5. Lies
6. När jag är med dig
7. Ingen ser min tår
8. Lång väg tillbaka
9. Res dig Joe
10. Dags för en tango
11. Kan du älska mig ändå
12. Twang thang
13. Samma tid, samma plats
14. Bruden som går över lik
15. När livet vänder

== Charts ==
=== Weekly charts ===
Chart (2013)	Peak position
VG-lista (Norwegian Albums Chart)	2
Sverigetopplistan (Swedish Albums Chart)	1

=== Year-end charts ===
Chart (2013)	Position
Swedish Albums (Sverigetopplistan)	8
