= Truck Stop (album) =

Studio album by Lasse Stefanz
- Released: 3 June 2009
- Genre: country, dansband music
- Label: Mariann

Lasse Stefanz chronology
En vän som du (2009)	Truck Stop (2009)	Upp till dans#12-14 June 2009: Lasse Stefanz, volume 2 (2009)

Truck Stop is a Lasse Stefanz studio album released on 3 June 2009. It was certified platinum in Sweden.

== Track listing ==
1. Ge mig mera
2. En sång till en vän
3. Clap Your Hands and Stamp Your Feet
4. Till en hjälte
5. Green Green Grass of Home
6. Hon tog mitt hjärta
7. Fjärlilslätta steg
8. Här hör jag hemma
9. Mary Ann
10. I natt är hon fri
11. Jag är så ensam nu i kväll
12. Jambalaya (On the Bayou)
13. Med vinden i ryggen
14. Jag bär på en gåva

== Charts ==
Chart (2009)	Peak position
Norway (VG-lista)	2
Sweden (Sverigetopplistan)	1

== Certifications ==
Region	Certification	Certified units/sales
Norway (IFPI Norway)	Gold	15,000^{*}
Sweden (GLF)	Platinum	40,000^{^}
^{*} Sales figures based on certification alone.^{^} Shipments figures based on certification alone.
