= En vän som du =

Compilation album by Lasse Stefanz
- Released: 1 April 2009
- Recorded: 1988–2008
- Genre: Country, dansband music
- Length: 2 hours, 11 minutes
- Label: Frituna

Lasse Stefanz chronology
Upp till dans#15-17 mars 2009: Lasse Stefanz (2009)	En vän som du (2009)	Truck Stop (2009)

En vän som du was released on 1 April 2009 and is a double compilation album by Swedish band Lasse Stefanz It consists of songs recorded by the band between 1988 and 2008.

== Track listing ==
1. Ingen väg tillbaka
2. En tid av stulen lycka
3. Nyanser
4. Fyll mitt hjärta med sång
5. Det är bara du
6. Lilla fågel flyg
7. Mitt hjärta sjung
8. Sjung din sång (Mano)
9. Skymningsklockor
10. Solen havet och lyckan
11. Den gamla grinden
12. Ännu blommar kärleken
13. Kärlekens sång (Für den Frieden der Welt)
14. Mi vida loca
15. Den tid vi behöver
16. Om jag säger det är kärlek
17. En ring på ditt finger (Wrapped Around)
18. Det kommer en morgon
19. Ge mig en ros (Buy Me a Rose)
20. Ett liv med dig
21. Tomma löften, tomma ord
22. En vän som du
23. Du har solen i ditt hjärta
24. Tänk på mig ibland (Please Remember Me)
25. Vår kärlek är stark
26. Röda rosor
27. Minnen utav kärlek
28. Det ska blåsa nya vindar (Bahamas)
29. Bring it on Home to Me
30. Tio röda rosor
31. Det är samma blå ögon (The Same Eyes that Always Drove Me Crazy)
32. Av hela mitt hjärta
33. Stanna en stund
34. Dear One
35. Vi drömde många drömmar (Vi dremte mange dromme)
36. Vindarnas sång
37. More than I Can Say
38. Gula höstlöv
39. Tre röda rosor
40. Express retur

== Charts ==
Chart (2009)	Peak position
Sweden	43
