= Olle Jönsson =

Swedish singer, songwriter and musician

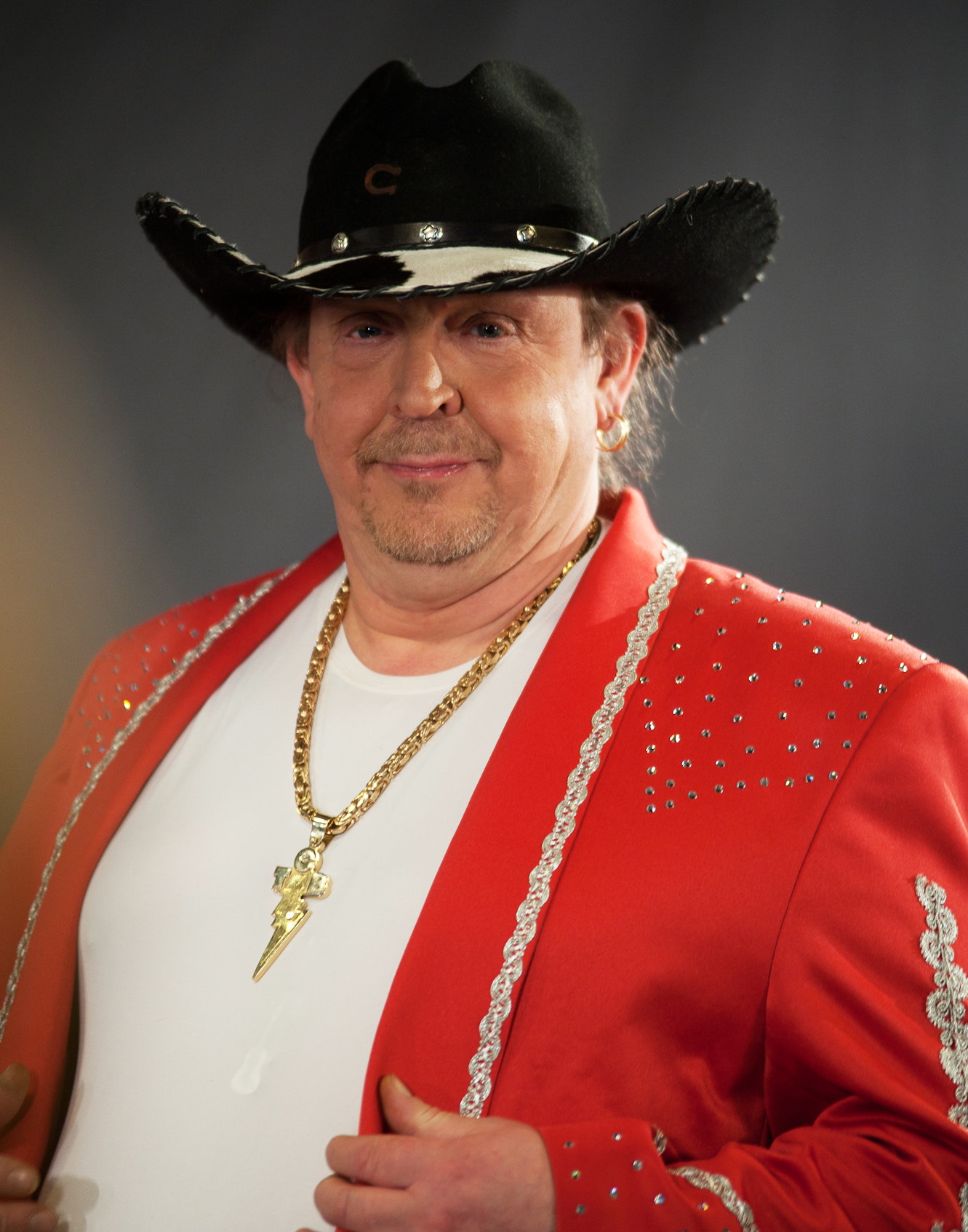
- Jönsson in 2010

Background information
- Birth name: Bengt-Olle Jonny Jönsson
- Born: 1 December 1955 (age 69); Kristianstad, Sweden
- Occupations: Singer; songwriter; musician
- Years active: 1967–present
- Musical career
- Genres: Dansband; country
- Instruments: Vocals; drums

Bengt-Olle Jonny Jönsson (born 1 December 1955) is a Swedish singer, songwriter and musician.

== Career ==
He is best known as the lead vocalist and primary lyricist of the dansband Lasse Stefanz. Earlier, he was also drummer, until a wrist operation. In January 2007, Gunnar Nilsson became the band's drummer instead.

In November 2012, Olle Jönsson announced he would immediately leave the band. But in the upcoming week, he reappeared on stage as the band's singer. He is a founding member of Lasse Stefanz.
