= Östgöta Nation, Lund =

Student union in Lund University, Sweden

Östgöta Nation
- Student nation
- Lund University
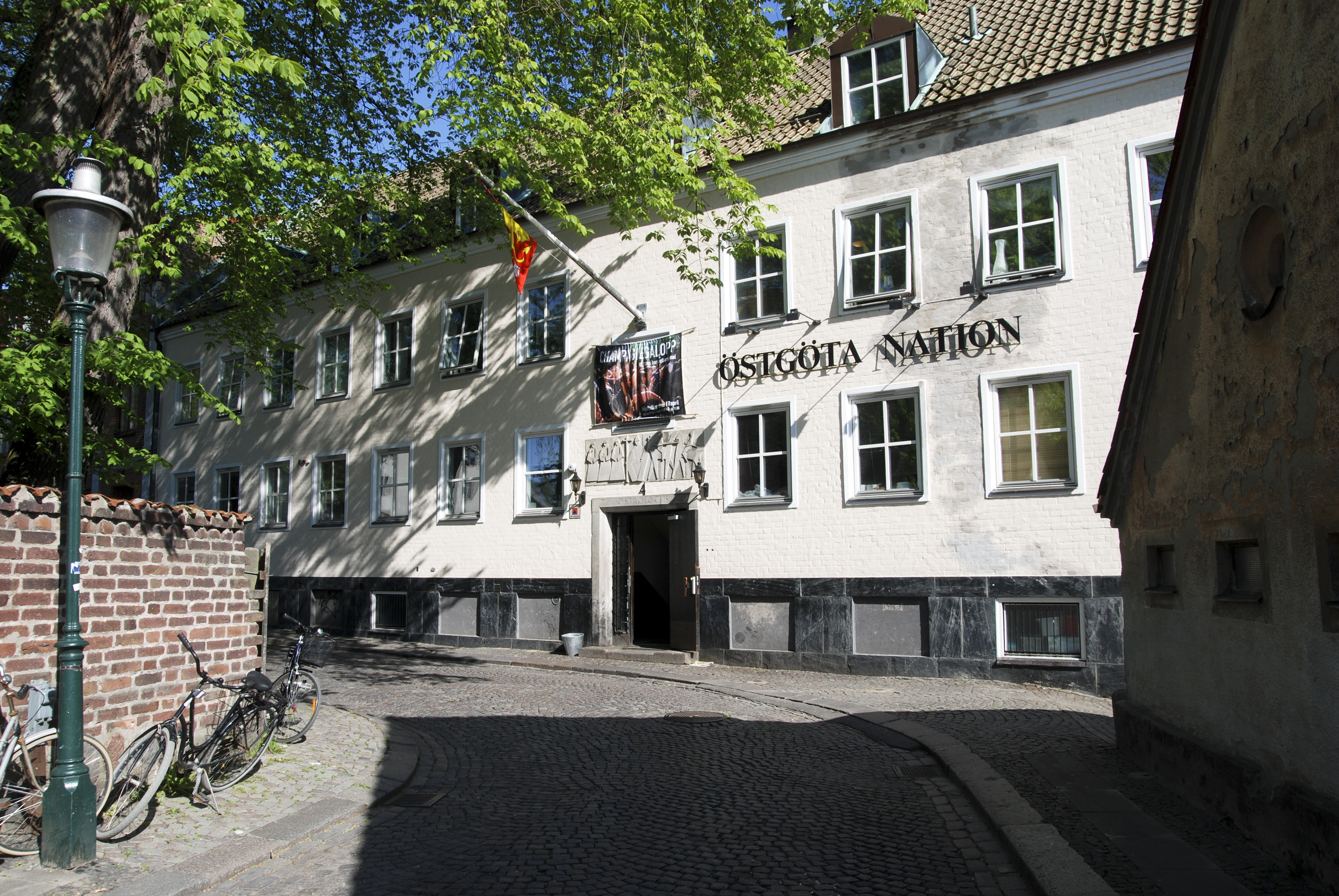

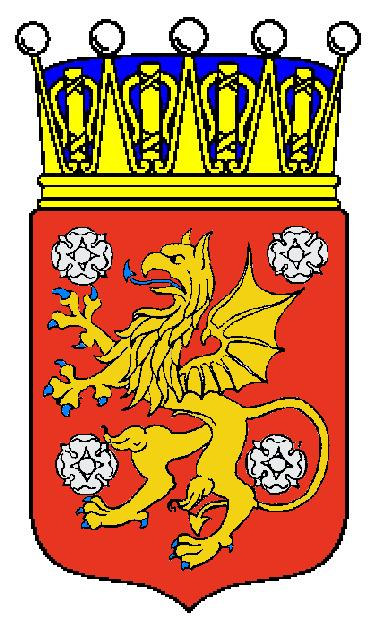
- Östgöta Nation uses the coat of arms of the province of Östergötland.
- Location: Adelgatan 4, Lund, Sweden
- Latin name: Natio Ostrogothica
- Abbreviation: ÖG
- Founded: 1668
- Namesake: Östergötland, Sweden
- Inspektor: Carl-Henric Nilsson
- Membership: 2,138 (Spring 2026)
- Website: https://www.ostgota.nu

The Östgöta Nation, or locally ÖG, is one of thirteen student nations of Lund University in Sweden. With its 2,138 members, it is the sixth-largest nation in Lund - ranking behind Västgöta but ahead of Kalmar Nation. It is arguably the oldest of the university's nations as it celebrated its 350th anniversary in 2018. The name Östgöta refers to the Swedish Östergötland province.

The nation was founded in the same year as the university was established – 1668. Around 40 students who had transferred from Uppsala University enrolled at the nation. With the Scanian War in 1676, the university was forced to close temporarily, as was the nation.

The nation reopened in 1681, and has since 1686 maintained written details of all meetings; these full details still exist to this day.

From 1766 to 1798, it was part of Götiska Nationen along with Västgöta and Kalmar.

Today the nation is located in central Lund at a house named Ostrolocus, not far from the city centre where Lund Cathedral, the Kungshuset and the Lund University main building are to be found.
