= Alf Ross =

Danish jurist (1899–1979)

- Born: Alf Niels Christian Ross; 10 June 1899; Copenhagen, Denmark
- Died: 17 August 1979 (aged 80); Virum, Denmark
- Citizenship: Danish
- Education: University of Copenhagen, Uppsala University
- Known for: Ross's paradox
- Scientific career
- Fields: Law, philosophy of law, sociology of law
- Workplaces: University of Copenhagen (1929–1969)
- Thesis: Theorie der Rechtsquellen: ein Beitrag zur Theorie des positiven Rechts auf Grundlage dogmenhistorischer Untersuchungen (1929)
- Doctoral advisor: Axel Hägerström

Alf Niels Christian Ross (10 June 1899 – 17 August 1979) was a Danish jurist, legal philosopher and judge of the European Court of Human Rights (1959–1971). He is best known as one of the leading figures of Scandinavian legal realism. His debate in 1959 with the prominent British legal philosopher H. L. A. Hart – which began in the Cambridge Law Journal (Vol. 17) – was important in framing the modern conflict between legal positivism and legal realism.

== Biography ==
=== Education and academic career ===
Ross was born in Copenhagen as a son of civil servant Frederik Ross and graduated from high school in 1917. Ross studied law at the University of Copenhagen graduating in 1922. He consequently worked in a barrister's office. In 1923, he commenced a study tour, which would last for two and a half years, visiting France, England and Austria, where he met and befriended fellow legal scholar, Hans Kelsen. He spent 1928–1929 at the Uppsala University, receiving a doctoral degree in philosophy in 1929 under the supervision of Axel Hägerström. In 1935, he was appointed to teach constitutional law at the University of Copenhagen.

=== On Law and Justice ===
In 1953, Ross published his most famous book Om Ret og Retfærdighed (which he would later publish in English, under the title On Law and Justice).

In this book, he states that there is no a priori validity to give the law some special position. Experience serves as a guideline. This means, for example, that the famous dictum ‘suum cuique tribuere’, ‘to give to everyone his own’, has no meaning until it has been determined what actually belongs to someone, which means that this is a matter of begging the question (On Law and Justice, § 64 (p. 276)). His determination not to rely on anything but the facts leads to statements as the following: “The legal rule is neither true nor false; it is a directive.” (On Law and Justice, § 2 (p. 2)). Furthermore, the norm is directed at judges rather than citizens (On Law and Justice, § 7 (p. 33)).

In this line of thought, he opposes natural law-approaches: “Like a harlot, natural law is at the disposal of everyone. The ideology does not exist that cannot be defended by an appeal to the law of nature. And, indeed, how can it be otherwise, since the ultimate basis for every natural right lies in a private direct insight, an evident contemplation, an intuition. Cannot my intuition be just as good as yours? Evidence as a criterion of truth explains the utterly arbitrary character of the metaphysical assertions. It raises them up above any force of inter-subjective control and opens the door wide to unrestricted invention and dogmatics.” (On Law and Justice, § 58 (p. 261).)

== Personal life ==
He was married to Else-Merete Ross, a Danish Social Liberal Party politician and Member of the Folketing from 1960 to 1973.

== Works ==
- "Imperatives and Logic", Theoria vol. 7, 1941, pp. 53–71
- Towards a Realistic Jurisprudence: A Criticism of the Dualism in Law (1946)
- A Textbook in International Law (1947)
- Constitution of the United Nations (1951)
- Why Democracy? (1952)
- "Tû-Tû", Harvard Law Review vol. 70, Issue 5, March 1957, pp. 812–825. Originally published in Festskrift til Henry Ussing. O. Borum, K. Ilium (eds.). Kobenhavn Juristforbundet, 1951
- On Law and Justice (1959)
- The United Nations: Peace and Progress (1966)
- Directives and Norms (1968)
- "On Self-Reference and a Puzzle in Constitutional Law", Mind (1969)
- On Guilt, Responsibility and Punishment (1975)

== Sources ==
- Hempel, Carl G. (1941). "Alf Ross. Imperatives and Logic". Journal of Symbolic Logic. 6 (3): 105. doi:10.2307/2268596. JSTOR 2268596. S2CID 125238818.
- Evald, Jens. Alf Ross: a life. Djoef Publishing (2014).
