= Cuba Libre (album) =

Studio album by Lasse Stefanz
- Released: June 8, 2011
- Genre: country, dansband music
- Label: Mariann

Lasse Stefanz chronology
Lasse Stefanz Goes 70's (2010)	Cuba Libre (2011)	Vår bästa country (2012)

Cuba Libre is a studio album by Lasse Stefanz, released in 2011. Already before the album was released, the band had sold platinum for the 14th time.

== Track listing ==
1. Cuba Libre
2. Dagen går mot kväll
3. På vår camping
4. Äppelblom, hägg och syren
5. Driving My Life Away
6. Ett regn av tårar
7. Comment ça va
8. Tiden läker inga sår
9. När tunga moln har landat
10. Sweet Senorita
11. Vi ses snart igen
12. Dom kallar mej playboy
13. Brev till en vän
14. Send Me Some Lovin'
15. Rap Das Armas - Parapapa
16. I Surrender ("En blick och nånting händer"), bonus)

== Charts ==
Chart (2011)	Peak position
Norwegian Albums (VG-lista)	17
Swedish Albums (Sverigetopplistan)	1

== Certifications ==
Region	Certification	Certified units/sales
Norway (IFPI Norway)	Gold	15,000^{*}
Sweden (GLF)	Platinum	40,000^{‡}
^{*} Sales figures based on certification alone.^{‡} Sales+streaming figures based on certification alone.
