= Christer Ericsson =

Swedish businessman

- Born: Jan Christer Ericsson; 27 March 1942; Skövde, Sweden
- Disappeared: 28 June 2016 (aged 74); Outside Marstrand, Sweden
- Status: Found deceased
- Body discovered: 27 August 2016; Sea outside Marstrand
- Occupation: Businessman

Jan Christer Ericsson (27 March 1942 – 28 June 2016) was a Swedish businessman. He developed a method for loading of containers, in which he tried unsuccessfully to interest his then-bosses at Stena Line. In his own business, Container Safe J C Ericsson AB, later known as Consafe, he developed his own ideas and was initially successful in sea transportation. In 1987, he published a book entitled Utan omsvep: mitt berikande liv med Consafe.

In the late 1970s, Consafe started to manufacture houses and service platforms for offshore businesses in co-operation with Svenska Varv. The business expanded, but went into bankruptcy in 1985.

Ericsson had already, before the bankruptcy, started to invest in other businesses. He was a major shareholder in the car dealership Philipson Bil and also invested in the oil and gas industry. Ericsson presented an episode of the Sveriges Radio show Sommar i P1 on 6 July 2006, where he spoke about his life and business career.

== Disappearance and discovery of body ==
Ericsson was reported missing at sea on 28 June 2016. His unoccupied boat had been found with fishing equipment inside it the previous day, north of Marstrand. His body was reportedly found on 27 August the same year. At the time of his disappearance and death he was a billionaire in kronor.

== Bibliography ==
- Ericsson, Jan Christer; Bergquist, Sven (1987), Utan omsvep: mitt berikande liv med Consafe (in Swedish), Stockholm: Timbro, Libris, ISBN 91-7566-129-2

== See also ==
- List of people who disappeared mysteriously at sea
