= De sista ljuva åren =

Song by Lasse Stefanz & Christina Lindberg

from the album Livets ljusa sida
- Language: Swedish
- Released: 1988
- Genre: Dansband
- Label: Frituna
- Songwriter: Jan Christer Eriksson
- Composer: Jan Christer Eriksson

"De sista ljuva åren", Swedish: The last sweet years, lyrics and music by Jan Christer Eriksson, is a song that Swedish dansband Lasse Stefanz and Swedish singer Christina Lindberg recorded in a duet. It was originally on Lasse Stefanz' 1988 album Livets ljusa sida. The unrhymed lyrics sentimentally describe the love between an ageing couple: Let the last sweet years be the best in our life.

== Chart places ==
=== Svensktoppen ===
As a single, "De sista ljuva åren" was originally a B-side, but was tested for Svensktoppen and entered the chart on February 5, 1989, and stayed for 65 rounds until September 23, 1990, which back then was the record. The song never managed to reach the first place. However, "De sista ljuva åren" became a big hit and one of the most famous dansband songs ever. In 2002, when Svensktoppen celebrated its 40th anniversary, it was appointed "Svensktoppen song of all times".

The record was broken by Sven-Ingvars 1991-1993 with the song Två mörka ögon.

== Cover versions ==
- Swedish heavy metal group Black Ingvars covered the song on their 1995 album "Earcandy Six", in a heavy metal style.
- Sven-Bertil Taube covered the song in 2001.
