= Karl Olivecrona =

Swedish lawyer and legal philosopher

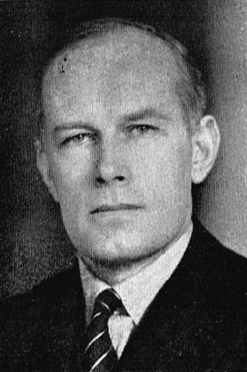

Karl Olivecrona (25 October 1897, in Norrbärke – 1980) was a Swedish lawyer and legal philosopher. He studied law at Uppsala from 1915 to 1920 and was a pupil of Axel Hägerström, the spiritual father of Scandinavian legal realism. One of the internationally best-known Swedish legal theorists, Olivecrona was a professor of procedural law and legal philosophy at Lund University. His writings emphasise the psychological significance of legal ideas. His most striking work on legal theory, the first edition of his book Law as Fact (of 1939, almost entirely different in content from the similarly titled 1971 work), stressed the importance of a monopoly of force as the basis of law. The book's second edition, published in 1971, was changed considerably due to Germany's defeat in World War II. Olivecrona's view on politics during the war was in fact a pure Nazi ideology; he emphasized a need for overwhelming coercive power to guarantee order in international relations. He became convinced that Europe required an unchallengeable controlling force to ensure its peace and unity, and that Germany alone could provide this. His pamphlet England eller Tyskland (England or Germany), published in 1940, the darkest days of the war, argued that Britain had lost its claim to exert leadership in Europe and that the future required an acceptance of German hegemony.

Indirectly, Scandinavian legal realism, with its emphasis on "law as fact", helped to create a climate conducive to the sociological study of law. One of Olivecrona's doctoral students, Per Stjernquist, who as a left-leaning liberal entirely rejected his supervisor's politics, became a pioneer of sociology of law and was largely responsible for establishing it as a university subject in Sweden in the early 1960s.

== Works ==
- Law as Fact (London: Oxford University Press, 1939)
- England eller Tyskland (Lund: C. W. K. Gleerup, 1940)
- Europa och Amerika (Lund: Sundqvist & Emond, 1941)
- "Is a Sociological Explanation of Law Possible?", 14 Theoria 167-207 (1948)
- Three Essays in Roman Law (Copenhagen: Einar Munksgaard, 1949)
- The Problem of the Monetary Unit (Stockholm: Almqvist & Wiksell, 1957)
- Law as Fact, 2nd edn. (London: Stevens & Sons, 1971) (ISBN 0-420-43250-7)
- "Locke's Theory of Appropriation", 24 Philosophical Quarterly 220-34 (1974)
- "Appropriation in the State of Nature: Locke on the Origin of Property", 35 Journal of the History of Ideas 211-30 (1974)
- "Bentham’s ‘Veil of Mystery'", 31 Current Legal Problems 227-37 (1978)

== Further references ==
- Roger Cotterrell, "Northern Lights: From Swedish Realism to Sociology of Law", 40 Journal of Law and Society 657-69 (2013).
- Torben Spaak, A Critical Appraisal of Karl Olivecrona's Legal Philosophy (Springer, 2014).
- "K H Karl Oivecrona". Svenskt biografiskt lexikon. In Swedish.

== See also ==
- Herbert Olivecrona, Karl's brother, considered the founder of Swedish neurosurgery
