= Lasse Stefanz =

Swedish dansband

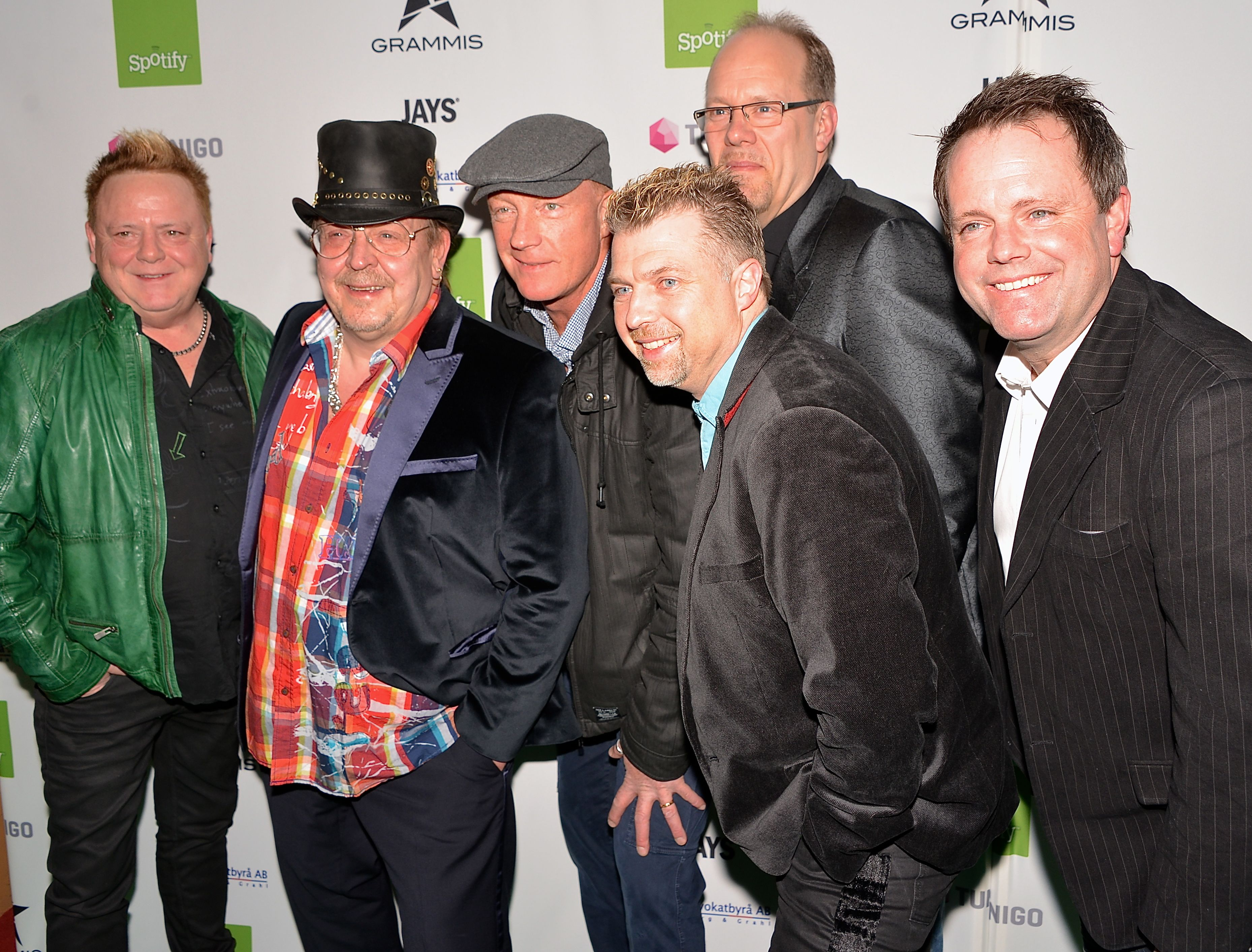
- Lasse Stefanz in 2013

Background information
- Also known as: Lasse Stefans
- Origin: Kristianstad, Sweden
- Genres: Dansband; country
- Years active: 1967–present
- Label: Mariann
- Members: Olle Jönsson; Jonas Rignell; Anders Dahlgren; Christer Ericsson; Gunnar Nilsson; Henrik Svensson
- Past members: Anders Pettersson; Lasse Sigfridsson; Hans Sigfridsson; Ola Olsson
- Website: lassestefanz.se

Lasse Stefanz is a Swedish dansband formed in Kristianstad in 1967. The band was popular during the 1980s. The band was formed by Hans Sigfridsson, Lars Sigfridsson and Olle Jönsson. Later members are Christer Ericsson, Anders Pettersson and Gunnar Nilsson. Olle Jönsson is the singer, as well as the ex-drummer. Lasse Stefanz had hits with songs as "Oh, Julie" (1982) and released albums as Peppelinos Bar (1988). 1989-1990, Lasse Stefanz and Christina Lindberg had a Svensktoppen hit with the song "De sista ljuva åren". In 1989, Lasse Stefanz was awarded a Grammis for "Dansband of the year".

The band participated in Melodifestivalen 2011 with the song "En blick och något händer." They participated in Melodifestivalen 2024 with "En sång om sommaren", being eliminated from their heat on 24 February 2024.

== Personnel ==
- Olle Jönsson – vocals
- Christer Ericsson – guitars
- Jonas Rignell – vocals, guitars, accordion
- Gunnar Nilsson – drums
- Anders Dahlgren – bass
- Henrik Svensson – keyboards, saxophones

== Discography ==
=== Studio albums ===
Year	Album	Peak positions		Certification
Year	Album	SWE	NOR	Certification
1974	Vad tiden går	–	–	
1975	Spelmansminnen	–	–	
1977	Sunshine	36	–	
1979	Darlin'	37	–	
1981	Vid en liten fiskehamn	49	–	
1982	Oh Julie	15	–	
1983	Mari Mari	27	–	
1984	Elaine	38	–	
1985	Fredens duva	27	–	
1986	Den lilla klockan	31	–	
1987	Nere på söder	16	–	
1988	Peppelinos Bar	20	–	
1988	Livets ljusa sida	27	–	
1989	Mot nya mål	32	–	
1990	Vindarnas Sång	36	–	
1992	Tic Tac Toe	33	–	
1994	Min angel	23	–	
1995	Bara du	21	–	
1996	Dig ska jag älskar	22	–	
1998	I ett fotoalbum	10	39	
1999	Över en kopp i vår berså	6	15	
2001	Emelie	3	16	
2001	I tomteverkstan	–	–	
2002	Mi Vida Loca	7	16	
2004	Röd Chevrolet	2	37	
2006	Pickup – 56	2	6	
2007	Vagabond	1	3	
2008	Rallarsväng	1	1	
2008	Sväng jul	4	39	
2009	Truck Stop	1	3	
2010	Texas	1	2	
2010	Lasse Stefanz Goes 70's	2	–	
2011	Cuba Libre	1	17	
2012	Rocky Mountains	1	8	
2013	Kärlek & Rock'n'roll	2	20	
2013	Trouble Boys	1	2	
2014	Honky Tonk Rebels	1	5	
2015	Whiskey Barrel	1	18	SWE: Gold
2016	Road Trip	1	7	
2017	Wind Me Up	1	–	
2017	Country Winter Party	1	25	
2018	Forever	1	–	
2019	Night Flight	1	7	
2022	Evergreen	1	–	

=== Compilation and live albums ===
Charting in Sverigetopplistan

Year	Album	Peak positions		Certification
Year	Album	SWE	NOR	Certification
1977	Strandpartajj	48	–	
1988	Det här är bara början	2	5	
2007	40 Ljuva År	1	2	
2008	Vart tog tiden vägen	31	–	
2009	En vän som du	43	–	
2012	Vår Bästa Country	2	–	
2013	Lasse Stefanz Stora Julparty	1	–	
2014	The Complete Collection	13	–	
2015	Greatest Hits	3	40	
2016	50th Anniversary (1967–2017)	1	–	
2023	Världens bästa Lasse Stefanz	2	–	

Listing

- 1977: Strandpartajj
- 1985: Ensam i ett regn
- 1986: Du försvann som en vind 1992-95
- 1988: Det här är bara början
- 1992: På Begäran
- 1995: Sommardansen
- 1995: En Gång Är Ingen Gång 1991-92
- 1995: De Sista Ljuva Åren 1988-89
- 1997: Sommardansen 2
- 1998: Jag Vill Ge Dig Min Morgon 90-98
- 1998: Lasse Stefanz på Svensktoppen
- 1998: Du Kan Tro På Mitt Ord 1995-97
- 2000: Guldkorn Vol.1 1974-2000
- 2000: Guldkorn Vol.2 1975-2000
- 2000: Sommardansen 3
- 2002: 16 Hits 1988-2002
- 2003: Det Här Är Bara Början
- 2004: 20 Favoriter
- 2004: Låt En Morgon Vakna 1992-2003
- 2006: 40 Ljuva År
- 2008: Vart Tog Tiden Vägen
- 2009: En Vän Som Du
- 2010: De Ljuva Åren 1988-2006 (3CD BOX)
- 2012: Vår Bästa Country

=== Charting singles ===
(in Sverigetopplistan)

Year	Single	Peak positions	Album
Year	Single	SWE	Album
1982	"Oh Julie"	16	Oh Julie
2008	"En runda i baren" (with Plura)	53	
2022	"Är det kärlek du behöver" (Nine EPA Remix)	49	
2022	"Minns det som igår"	85	
2022	"En säng av rosor"	71	
2022	"Där jag hänger min hatt"	65	
2023	"Kom och rulla i mit rullande hus" (with Sofie Svensson and Dom Dar)	69	
2024	"En sång om sommaren"	70	

Listing (in Svensktoppen)

- 1982: "Oh, Julie" (#1)
- 1986: "Oklahoma" (#1)
- 1987: "Nere på Söder" (#8)
- 1987: "Världens lyckligaste par" (#1)
- 1988: "Det här år bara början" (#4)
- 1989: "De sista ljuva åren" (with Christina Lindberg') (#2)
- 1989: "Mot nya mål" (#9)
- 1992: "En gång är ingen gång" (#8)
- 1992: "Stanna kvar" (#10)
- 1993: "Jag väntat många dagar" (#7)
- 1994: "Du försvann som en vind" (#1)
- 1994: "Jag kommer hem igen" (#7)
- 1995: "Jag ångrar ingenting" (#5)
- 1995: "Midsommarafton" (#3)
- 1995: "En enkel sång om kärleken" (#4)
- 1995: "Visst är det kärlek" (#10)
- 1996: "Dig ska jag älska" (#3)
- 1997: "Av hela mitt hjärta" (#4)
- 1997: "Du kan tro på mitt ord" (#4)
- 1998: "Tomma löften tomma ord" (#6)
- 1997: "I ett fotoalbum" (#4)
- 1999: "Över en kopp i vår berså" (#2)
- 2000: "Vår kärlek är stark" (#3)
- 2000: "Det finns en vind" (#3)
- 2001: "Emelie" (#4)
- 2001: "När gässen återvänder" (#5)
- 2001: "Ute på vischan" (#5)
- 2002: "Låt en morgon vakna" (#1)
- 2003: "Ingenting mer" (#8)
- 2005: "En bättre värld" (#9)
- 2007: "På egna vägar" (#8)
- 2008: "En runda i baren" (with Plura Jonsson) (#7)
- 2008: "Hemmahamn" (#7)
- 2008: "Vitare än snö" (#9)
- 2009: "Här hör jag hemma" (#7)
- 2010: "Copacabana" (#8)
- 2011: "Skåneland" (#10)

==== Failed to enter svensktoppen ====
- "Vid en liten fiskehamn, 1982
- "Jag kommer med kärlek", 1999
- "När countryn kom till Skåne", 2006
- "En blick om nånting händer", 2011
- "Cuba Libre 2011
- Sara solsken- 2012

== DVDs / VHS ==
- 2003: Från Österlen till Oklahoma
- 2009: Ingen dans på rosor
- 2010: På väg till Malung med Lasse Stefanz
