= New Student House, Helsinki =

Student house of the Student Union of the Helsinki University

Coordinates: 60°10′09.7″N 024°56′24″E

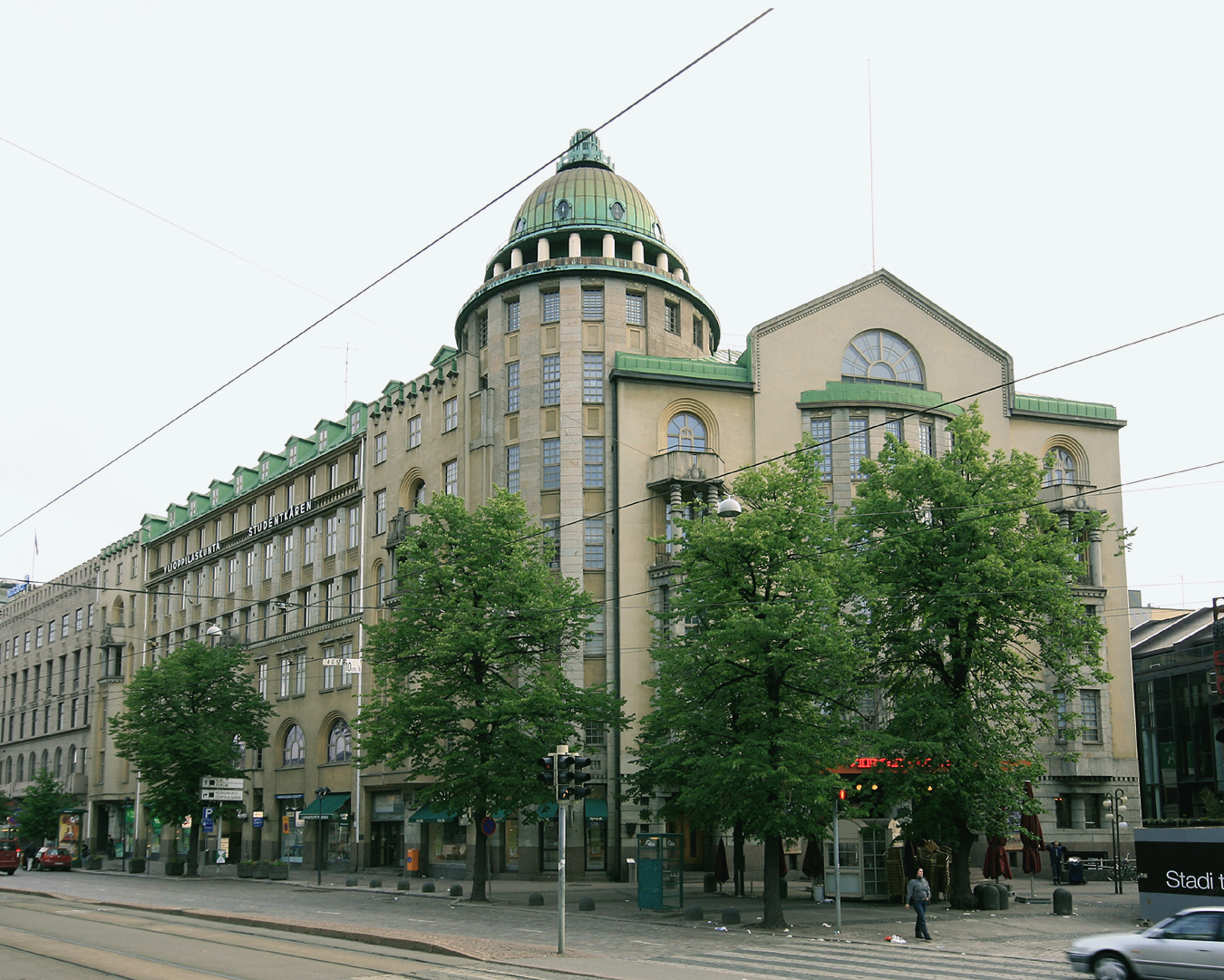
The new student house.

The New Student House (Finnish: Uusi ylioppilastalo, colloquially Uusi, "the new one"; Swedish: Nya studenthuset), originally named Osakuntatalo ("the House of the Nations"), is the current student house of the Student Union of the University of Helsinki, located in central Helsinki, Finland, at Mannerheimintie 5, right next to the Old Student House. It is part of the Kaivopiha building complex owned by the student union. The new student house houses the central office of the student union, the Ylioppilaslehti office, and premises for many nations and student organisations; part of the building has also been leased for third-party business and office use.

The new student house was completed in 1910, and was designed by architects Armas Lindgren and Wivi Lönn. From 1924-1968 it contained the Hotel Hansa. The building used to be called Osakuntatalo and was mainly used by the student nations at the university. Five of the fifteen nations at the University of Helsinki still work in the building: the Finnish-speaking Eteläsuomalainen osakunta, Savolainen osakunta and Varsinaissuomalainen osakunta along with the Swedish-speaking Åbo Nation and Östra Finlands Nation.

The A side of the new student house, and part of the B side, remains only in the use of student activities. The third student house of the student union was inaugurated in November 2008 in Leppäsuo near Domus Academica.

The structure is currently being remodeled, along with the historic Hotel Seurahuone. Both are owned by the HYY Group, the business arm of the Student Union of the University of Helsinki. The structures are being combined into a single luxury hotel, to be called the Grand Hansa Hotel. It will open in 2022, managed by The Unbound Collection division of Hyatt.
