= Laura Kolbe =

Finnish historian and politician

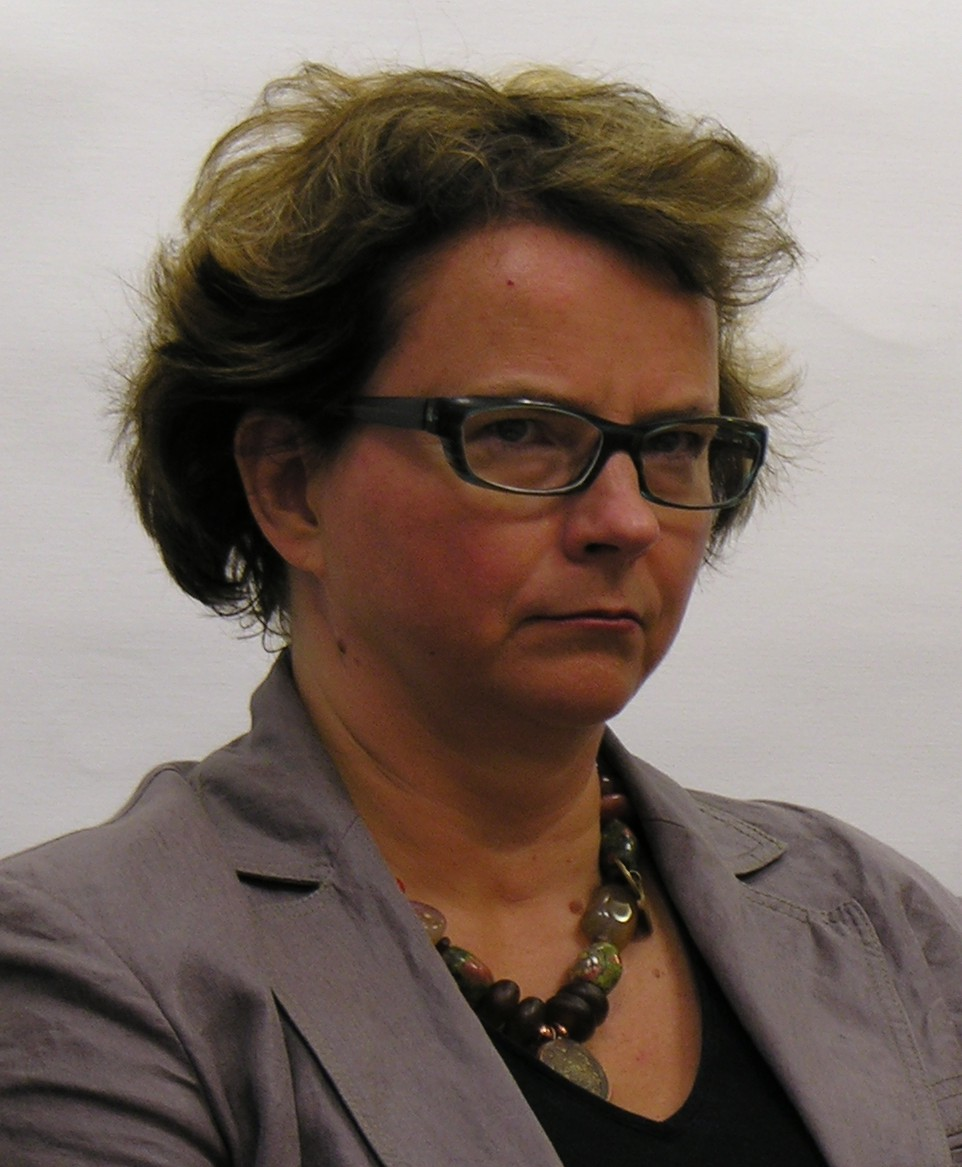
- Laura Kolbe in 2008.
- Born: Bogotá, Colombia
- Title: Professor Emerita

Academic background
- Education: Doctor of Philosophy
- Alma mater: University of Helsinki
- Thesis: Kulosaari: unelma paremmasta tulevaisuudesta (1988)

Academic work
- Discipline: European history
- Institutions: University of Helsinki
- Website: http://laurakolbe.net/index.htm

Laura Kolbe (born 9 September 1957) is a Finnish professor emerita of European history at the University of Helsinki. She was also a Helsinki City Council member, representing the Centre Party, and the former Inspector of Eteläsuomalainen osakunta, a student nation representing Southern Finland.

== Life and career ==
Kolbe was born in Bogotá, Colombia, to a German Russian economist father, Boris, and a Finnish journalist mother, Pirkko. Kolbe earned her M.A. in history at the University of Helsinki and in 1989 she completed her Ph.D. Her thesis, Kulosaari - A Dream of a Better Future (1988) dealt with early suburbanization in Helsinki compared to other Scandinavian capitals, London, and Berlin. From 1983 to 1991 Kolbe worked as a curator for Mannerheim Museum in Helsinki and she is a member in the governing body of the museum. In 1994 Kolbe was appointed Senior Lecturer at the University of Helsinki, teaching urban, social and cultural history as well as the history of ideas. During 1996 to 2000 she worked as an adviser for Eeva Ahtisaari, wife of Martti Ahtisaari, President of Finland. In the Spring of 2007, she was a Fellow at the Swedish Collegium for Advanced Study in Uppsala, Sweden.

== Bibliography ==
- Kolbe, Laura, Portraying Finland: Facts and Insights. 2005. Otava. ISBN 951-1-20151-4.
- Kolbe, Laura, Ihanuuksien ihmemaa – Suomalaisen itseymmärryksen jäljillä. 2010. Kirjapaja. ISBN 952-247-054-6.
- Kolbe, Laura, Yläluokka – Olemisen sietämätön vaikeus. 2014. Kirjapaja. ISBN 952-288-123-6.
