= Västgöta nation, Uppsala =

Student nation of Uppsala University

Coordinates: 59°51′24″N 17°38′20″E

Västgöta Nation
- Uppsala University
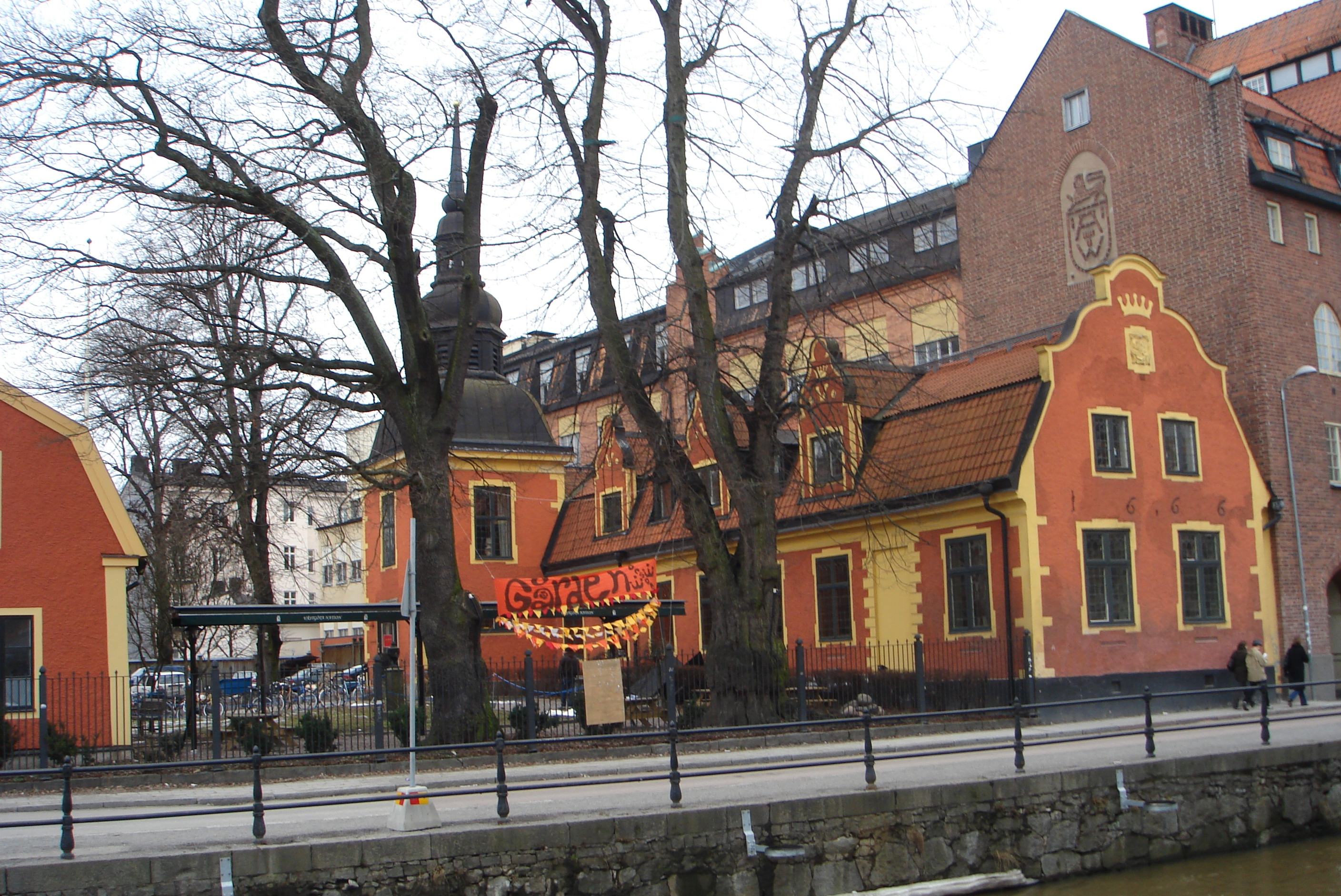
- Location: Slottsgränd 10; 753 09 UPPSALA; Sweden
- Latin name: Natio Westrogothiae
- Abbreviation: VG
- Established: 1639
- Inspektor: Bertil Wiman
- Membership: approx. 1300
- Website: www.vastgotanation.se

Västgöta Nation, commonly known as Västgöta or VG, is one of the thirteen student nations of Uppsala University, originally intended for students from Västergötland Province. It was founded in 1639 and thus is Uppsala's oldest nation. With about 1 200 members Västgöta Nation is one of the smaller nations at Uppsala but still has extensive cultural activities including three choirs, a theatre club and an orchestra.

The nation's building (Swedish: nationshus) lies along the Fyris river and was probably built in 1604, though its cellar is much older. The building survived a citywide fire in 1702, unusually for central Uppsala. Amongst the building's former owners was Field Marshal Lennart Torstenson, and it has been in the nation's possession since 1825.

== Activities ==
The nation divides its activities into two main categories, culture and the 'club-office' (Swedish: klubbverket). Cultural activities include choirs (mixed choir, men's choir and ladies choir), theatre club, orchestra and sports club. The second category includes gasques, the pub Djäknen, the fortnightly restaurant KäK, daily vegan soup lunch and weekend fika.

=== Club office ===
A gasque is a traditional formal student dinner followed by an afterparty known as a släpp. In the autumn term these usually include a Kräftgasque (crayfish gasque), Reccegasque (freshmen's gasque), Damsupé (ladies' dinner), Herrmiddag (gentlemen's dinner) and Luciagasque (Saint Lucia's Day dinner). The autumn's biggest event is a ball called the Gåsmiddag or goose dinner, celebrated near Saint Martin's Day. The winter/spring term usually includes Reccegasque, a Kulturgasque (culture-gasque), Damsupé, Herrmiddag and Majmiddag (May dinner). The biggest events are clustered around Walpurgis Night, including Tirolborg and the Vårbal (spring ball).

Djäknen is the nation's pub, located in the oldest part of the nation's building, the mediaeval cellar.

== Friend Nations ==
- Västgöta nation, Lund
- Nylands Nation, Helsinki
- Keskisuomalainen Osakunta, Helsinki

== Inspektors ==
In 1663 Ericus Odhelius, professor of theology, became the nation's first inspektor. Bertil Wiman, professor of swedish Law and Taxes is the current inspector.

Västgöta nation

- Ericus Odhelius 1663-1665
- Petrus Fontelius 1665-1669
- Samuel Skunck 1670-1682
- Johannes Bilberg 1683-1692
- Elias Obrecht 1692-1698
- Johannes Palmroot 1698-1727
- Petrus Schyllberg 1727-1735
- Elias Frondin 1736-1747
- Engelbert Halenius 1747-1753
- Martin Strömer 1753-1756
- Carl Aurivillius 1757-1786
- Jonas Sidrén 1786-1788
- Pehr Fabian Aurivillius 1788-1800
- Johan Winbom 1800-1826
- Sven Lundblad 1826-1830
- Olof Kolmodin 1830-1838
- Anders Erik Knös 1838-1862
- Anders Fredrik Beckman 1862-1864
- Per Hedenius 1864-1889
- Johan August Ekman 1889-1898
- Erik Berggren 1899-1909
- Herman Lundström 1909-1916
- Rudolf Kjellén 1917-1922
- Richard Ekblom 1923-1939
- Gunnar Rudberg 1939-1945
- Elias Melin 1945-1956
- Ingemar Hedenius 1956-1971
- John-Erik Thun 1972-1989
- Adam Taube 1989-1998
- Lars-Gunnar Larsson 1999-2011
- Bertil Wiman 2011-2015
- Hans Albin Larsson 2015-present
