= Östra Finlands Nation =

University of Helsinki Swedish (1924)

- Latin name: Natio Fenniae Orientalis
- Abbreviation: ÖFN
- Formation: 1924
- Inspector: Kai Nordlund
- Members: 180
- Address: Mannerheimintie 5 A 00100 Helsinki; Finland
- Website: ofn.fi

Student Nations at Helsinki University
- Nylands; Eteläsuomalainen; Savolainen; Karjalainen; Hämäläis; Keskisuomalainen; Kymenlaakson; Åbo; Varsinaissuomalainen; Satakuntalainen; Wiipurilainen; Östra Finlands; Etelä-Pohjalainen; Vasa; Pohjois-Pohjalainen

Östra Finlands Nation (ÖFN) is one of the 15 student nations at the University of Helsinki, Swedish-speaking and established in 1924. The nation is formed to represent the interests of Swedish-speaking students coming from Eastern Finland, nowadays interpreted as the community of Sipoo and any place more to the east of it. While the official language of the nation is Swedish and most members are students at the University of Helsinki, any student (including international degree or exchange students) studying at any university or applied university in the Helsinki region is welcome as a member.

== History ==
Historically, this nation was split off in 1924 from one of the original nations of the university, "Wiborgs nation", that is nowadays known as "Wiipurilainen osakunta" and was originally established in 1654 for students coming from the region of the city of Vyborg. Hence the nation maintains the memory and traditions of the city of Wyborg as its heritage.

== Current activities ==
In the current day, the nation represents the interests of Swedish-speaking students coming from Eastern Finland in the University community. It also provides a meeting place for leisurely and academic activities for its members at its premises, "Nypolen", at the new student house of the University of Helsinki student union. It also regularly arranges excursions to Eastern Finland and Vyborg, as well as friend nations in Sweden. It also participates in the joint activities of all the Nations at the university of Helsinki.
