= Elias Melin =

Swedish bryologist, mycologist and botanist (1889–1979)

- Born: Johannes Botvid Elias Melin; July 28, 1889; Valstad parish, Västergötland
- Died: March 22, 1979 (aged 89); Helga Trefaldighet parish, Uppsala, Uppland
- Citizenship: Sweden
- Occupations: bryologist, mycologist and botanist
- Employer: Uppsala University
- Spouse: Margit Valley (married 1921–1969)

Johannes Botvid Elias Melin, (born July 28, 1889 in Valstad parish, in what was then Skaraborg County, Sweden, died March 22, 1979 in Helga Trefaldighet parish in Uppsala) was a Swedish botanist and professor.

Melin defended his PhD at Uppsala University in 1917. His thesis was Studies on the vegetation of the northern marshlands with special regard to their forest vegetation after drainage. He later became professor of physiological botany at the university.

Elias Melin was the son of Samuel Melin, a priest ("contract dean") in the Church of Sweden, and Hilda Melin, née Stenborg. Some of his siblings also became priests.

He was a member of the Royal Swedish Academy of Sciences.

Preceded by Gunnar Rudberg	Inspector of Västgöta nation 1945-1956	Succeeded by Ingemar Hedenius
