= HYY =

HYY may refer to:

- Student Union of the University of Helsinki (Finnish: Helsingin yliopiston ylioppilaskunta)
- Happy Yipee Yehey!, a Philippine television program
