= Savolainen osakunta =

Student nation at the University of Helsinki

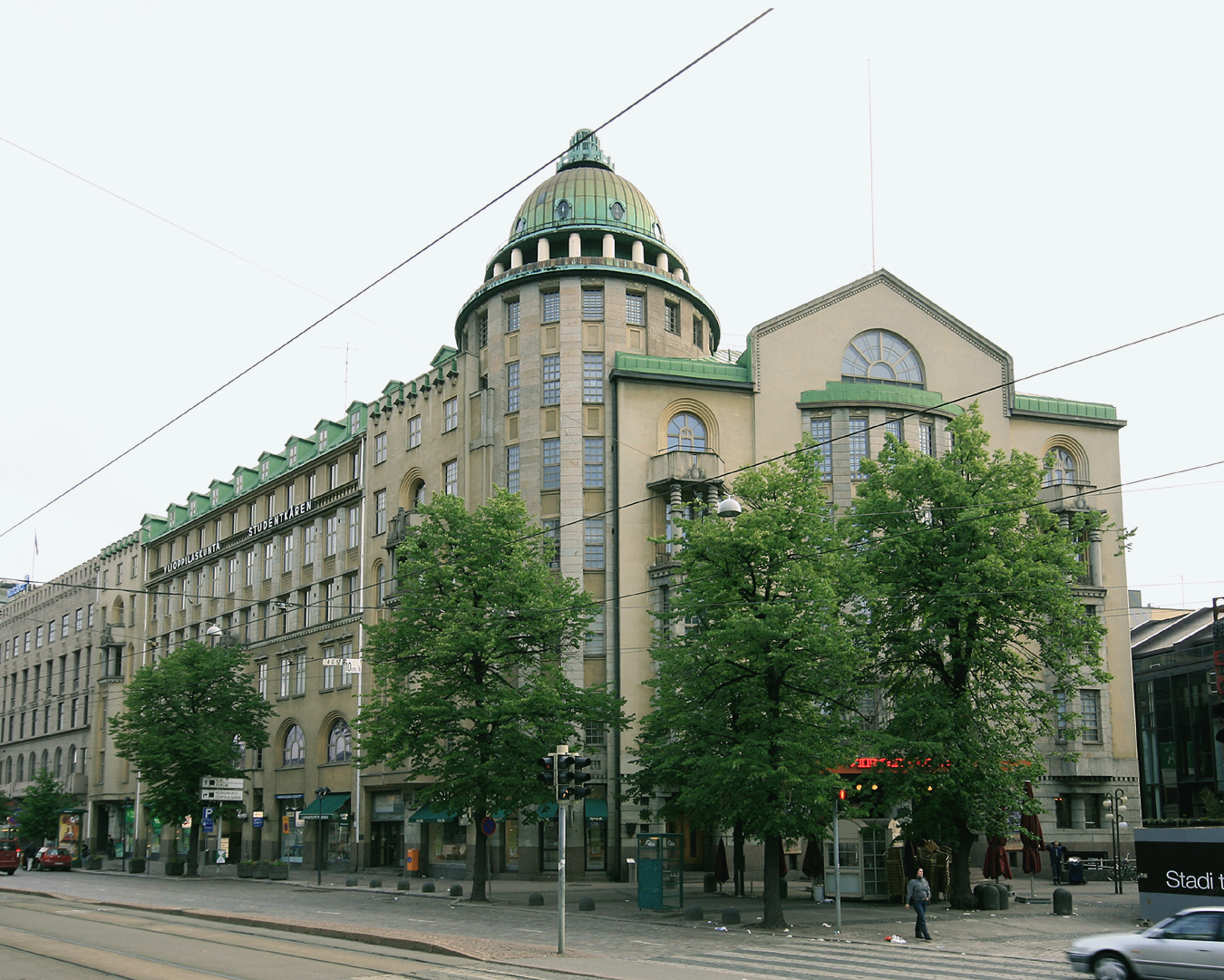
- SavO at Uusi Ylioppilastalo
- Latin name: Natio Savolaxi
- Abbreviation: SavO
- Formation: 1905
- Inspector: Martti Nissinen
- Address: Lapinrinne 1 A 5; 00180 Helsinki; Finland
- Website: savolainenosakunta.fi

Student Nations at Helsinki University
- Nylands; Eteläsuomalainen; Savolainen; Karjalainen; Hämäläis; Keskisuomalainen; Kymenlaakson; Åbo; Varsinaissuomalainen; Satakuntalainen; Wiipurilainen; Östra Finlands; Etelä-Pohjalainen; Vasa; Pohjois-Pohjalainen

Savolainen osakunta (abr. SavO; Swedish: Savolax nation, English: Savonian nation) is one of the 15 student nations at the University of Helsinki. It is one of the Finnish-speaking nations and was established in 1905. The nation's long-time premises were on the top floor of the new student house, also known as "Vinni", from 1931 until 2026, when the Student Union of the University of Helsinki was forced to sell the building after poor risk management in real estate investments almost lead to bankruptcy of the Student Union. As of 2026, the temporary premises of Savolainen Osakunta are located in Satakuntatalo on Lapinrinne.

== History ==
The concept of student nations, divided by geografic area, was conceived in University of Paris, Sorbonne. When the Royal Academy of Turku was founded in 1640, the concept of nations was also present. The earliest mention of Savonians was in 1653.

The present nation was founded on 1 October 1905 with Karjalainen Osakunta, when the two nations split from Savo-karjalainen osakunta. The anniversary day of SavO is 20 February, or the nearest Saturday or Sunday, in remembrance of the decree that Finnish was introduced to the courts and the authorities.

Membership has fallen since 1968, when student movements were radicalized, even though the legal requirement of being a part of a nation was abolished in 1937.

== Administration ==
Judicial status of the nation – just like other nations – is based on the Universities Act and also the regulations of the university.

The highest deciding body of the nation is the meeting of the nation, where the inspector heads the meeting. At the beginning of 2008, the inspector is Martti Nissinen, professor of Old Testament studies in the Faculty of Theology at the University of Helsinki.

The nation is governed by the nation council, which is chosen every year. The council is headed by the curator, who is an older member or a former member. The regulations of the nation explicitly state that the curator must be at least a proper (or former) member. The curator is chosen every other year, and has a term of two years. The curator for the term 2024-2025 is Lauri Hatakka. Other members of the council are executive director, secretary, treasurer and four councillors. Practical activities are taken care by functionaries.

== People ==
=== Inspectors ===
- Theodor Homén 1905–1923
- Oswald Streng 1923–1924
- K. R. Brotherus 1924–1928
- A. F. Puukko 1929–1945
- Mauno J. Kotilainen 1945–1960
- Lennart Pinomaa 1961–1963
- Pentti Pöyhönen 1964–1968
- Aarne Nyyssönen (act. 1964–1965) 1969–1975
- Mikko Korhonen 1975–1983
- Toivo Holopainen 1984–1987
- Raimo Väyrynen 1988–1992
- Mirja Saari 1993–1999
- Mauno Kosonen 2000–2007
- Martti Nissinen 2008–

=== Honorary members ===
In parentheses is the year of induction.

- Thiodolf Rein (1905)
- Juhani Aho (1908)
- E. G. Palmén (1910)
- P. E. Svinhufvud (1917)
- Otto Manninen
- Konstantin Päts (1930)
- Oswald Renkonen
- A. F. Puukko
- Ilmari Salomies (1953)
- P. J. Hynninen (1958)
- Mauno Kotilainen (1961)
- Martti Ruutu (1962)
- Olavi Nieminen (1980)
- Erik Elinder (1992)
- Kai Laitinen (1995)
- Antero Nederström (2001)
- Mirja Saari
- Mauno Kosonen (2014)
- Rauno Puisto (2020)
- Olli Rehn (2020)
- Eeva Ahtisaari (2023)

== Relations to other associations ==
Savolainen osakunta is an active association within the Student Union of the University of Helsinki. Cooperation is done between other nations and through Osakuntien Yhteisvaltuuskunta. Close relations are especially with Karjalainen Osakunta, as well as to neighbours in the student house, Eteläsuomalainen osakunta and Varsinaissuomalainen osakunta. Politics within the student union is through the student political party Osakuntalainen Unioni.

The nation cooperates with Savolaisen Osakunnan Seniorit ry, which is the association of former members and graduated members of the nation. With the association, the nation governs Savolaisten ylioppilassäätiö, which owns the apartments of the nation.

=== Friendships ===
SavO has friendship agreements with student associations abroad.

The first agreement was established in 1930, with the male corporation Fratenitas Estica in Tartu, Estonia and shortly after with the female corporation Indla. Contact was also continued during Soviet occupation of Estonia.

Relations to Swedish nations were also being negiotiated at the same period, but formal agreement with Värmlands Nation in Uppsala was reached only in 1951. Agreements with Wermlands Nation in Lund and Linköping were reached in 1956 and in 2005 respectively.
