= Etelä-Pohjalainen Osakunta =

Coordinates: 60°11′N 24°56′E

- Abbreviation: EPO
- Formation: 1908
- Inspector: Jorma Keski-Oja
- Address: Töölönkatu 3 A 00100 Helsinki; Finland
- Website: epo.osakunta.fi

Student Nations at Helsinki University
- Nylands; Eteläsuomalainen; Savolainen; Karjalainen; Hämäläis; Keskisuomalainen; Kymenlaakson; Åbo; Varsinaissuomalainen; Satakuntalainen; Wiipurilainen; Östra Finlands; Etelä-Pohjalainen; Vasa; Pohjois-Pohjalainen

Etelä-Pohjalainen Osakunta (EPO), also the South Ostrobothnian Nation, is one of the 15 student nations at the University of Helsinki, Finnish-speaking and established in 1908.

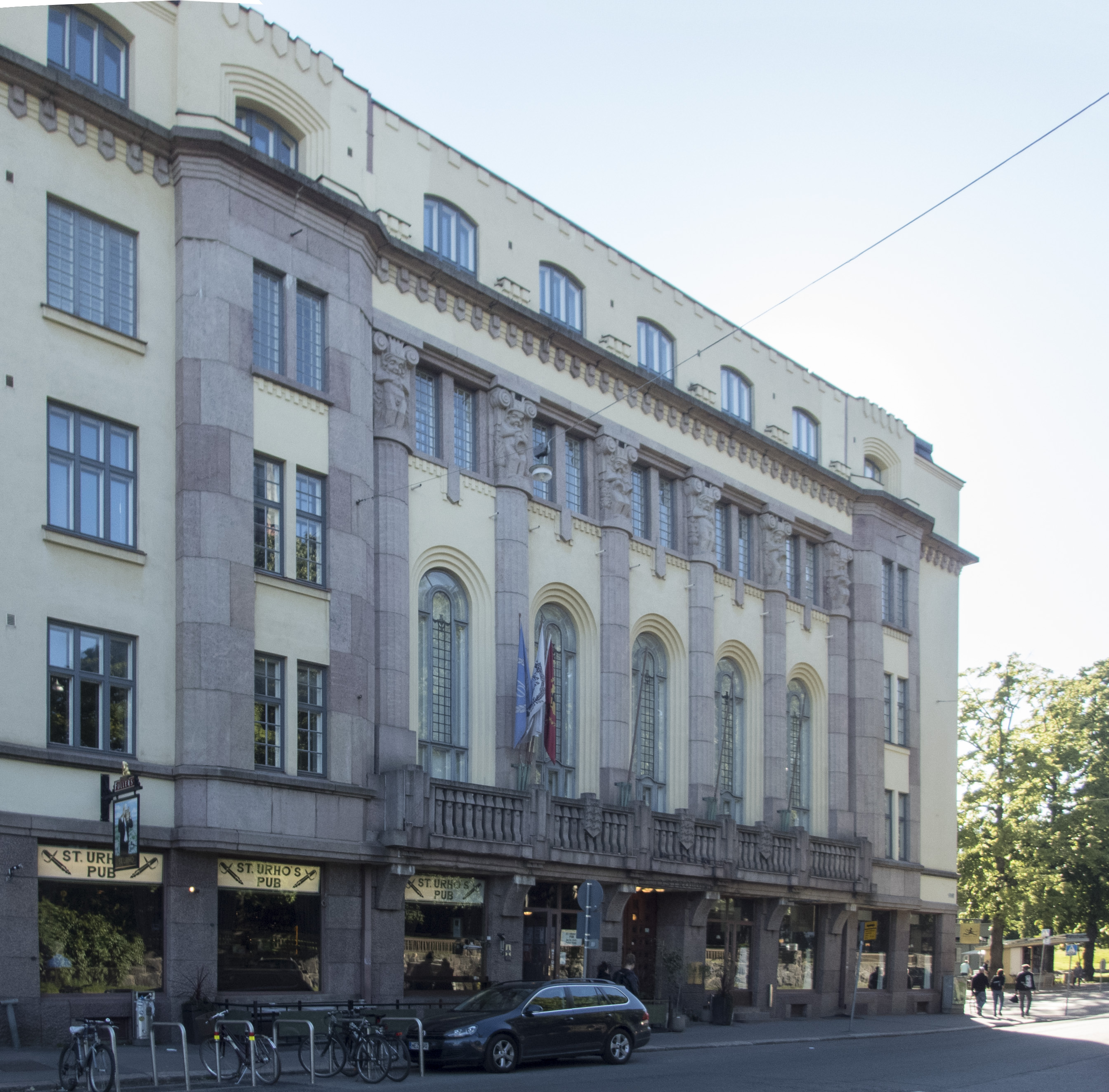
The Ostrobotnia House, also Botta, facing east

EPO formed the historical Pohjalainen Osakunta, or Österbottniska Nationen (Latin: Natio Ostrobothniensis), together with the Pohjois-Pohjalainen Osakunta (PPO) and the Swedish-speaking Vasa nation. Established in 1643, it was one of the original nations at the Royal Academy of Turku, moving to Helsinki in 1828 with the relocation of the university. EPO still has close ties with the other Ostrobothnian nations.

Together, they share the Ostrobotnia House in central Helsinki near the Parliament House, one of several buildings owned by different student organizations in the city.
