= North Ostrobothnian Nation =

Pohjois-Pohjalainen Osakunta
- Latin name: Natio Ostrobothniensis Septentrionalis
- Abbreviation: PPO
- Formation: 1907
- Inspector: Tuula Linna
- Members: ca 500
- Address: Töölönkatu 3 A 00100 Helsinki; Finland
- Website: ppo.osakunta.fi

Student Nations at Helsinki University
- Nylands; Eteläsuomalainen; Savolainen; Karjalainen; Hämäläis; Keskisuomalainen; Kymenlaakson; Åbo; Varsinaissuomalainen; Satakuntalainen; Wiipurilainen; Östra Finlands; Etelä-Pohjalainen; Vasa; Pohjois-Pohjalainen

North Ostrobothnian Nation (Finnish: Pohjois-Pohjalainen Osakunta, PPO) is one of the 15 student nations at the University of Helsinki. PPO is Finnish-speaking and established in 1907. Originally formed by students from the northern former Oulu and Lapland Provinces, the nation now accepts anyone studying in the Helsinki region as a member.

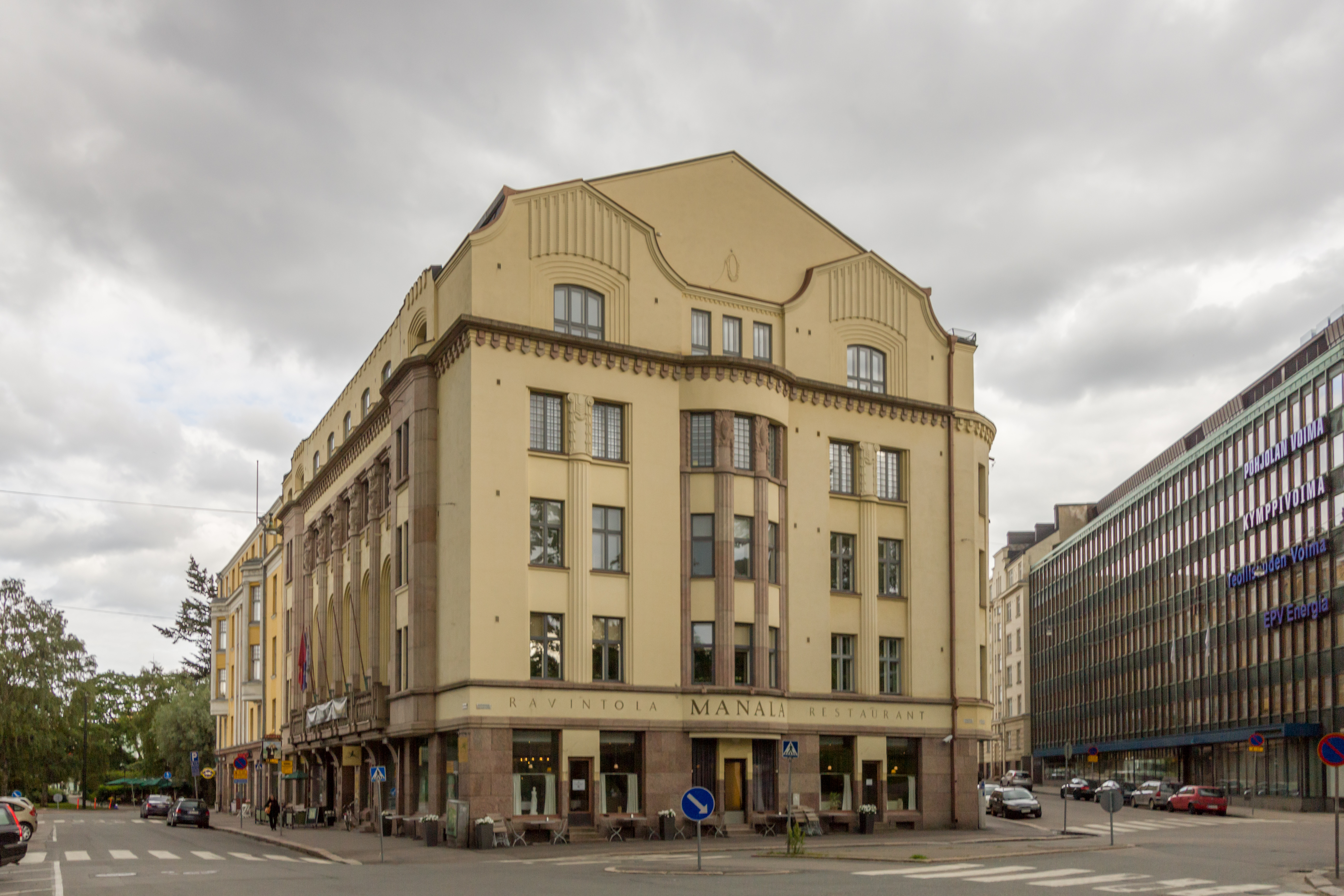
Ostrobotnia House, or Botta, built in 1912 facing north

PPO formed the historical Pohjalainen Osakunta, or Österbottniska Nationen (Latin: Natio Ostrobothniensis), together with Etelä-Pohjalainen Osakunta and Vasa nation. Established in 1643, it was one of the original nations at the Royal Academy of Turku, moving to Helsinki in 1828 with the relocation of the university. PPO still has close ties with the other Ostrobothnian nations. Together, they share the Ostrobotnia House (pictured) in central Helsinki, one of several buildings owned by different student organizations in the city.

Famous former members of PPO include two Presidents of Finland, K. J. Ståhlberg and Urho Kekkonen.
