= Kymenlaakson Osakunta =

- Abbreviation: KyO
- Formation: 1933
- Inspector: Jari Lavonen
- Members: ~170
- Address: Leppäsuonkatu 11; 00100 Helsinki; Finland
- Website: kymenlaaksonosakunta.fi

Student Nations at Helsinki University
- Nylands; Eteläsuomalainen; Savolainen; Karjalainen; Hämäläis; Keskisuomalainen; Kymenlaakson; Åbo; Varsinaissuomalainen; Satakuntalainen; Wiipurilainen; Östra Finlands; Etelä-Pohjalainen; Vasa; Pohjois-Pohjalainen

Kymenlaakson Osakunta (KyO) is one of the 15 student nations at the University of Helsinki, Finnish-speaking and established in 1933. Kymenlaakson Osakunta's home region is the province of Kymenlaakso in south-eastern Finland and constitutes from the cities of Hamina, Kotka and Kouvola and municipalities of Iitti, Miehikkälä, Pyhtää and Virolahti. The area of the town of Loviisa is a shared region with the Eteläsuomalainen Osakunta.

KyO's friendship organisations on aboard are the Korporatsioon Fraternitas Tartuensis in Tartu (since 1936, renewed 1990), Kalmar Nation in Uppsala (since 1947), Hallands Nation in Lund (since 1986) and Korporatsioon Sororitas Estoniae in Tartu (since 2017). In Finland KyO's friendship student nation is the Wiipurilainen Osakunta (Helsinki) and as co-operation student nations Karjalainen Osakunta (Helsinki) and Savo-Karjalainen Osakunta (Turku). KyO is the member of the Finnish Student Nations Co-Delegation OYV/NSD and also student political group Osakuntalainen Unioni. Since 2017 KyO has also been a member of the Delegation of Eastern Finland with Karjalainen, Savolainen, Wiipurilainen Osakunta and Östra Finlands Nation.
