= Nylands Nation =

Student national at the University of Helsinki

Coordinates: 60°09′56″N 24°56′52″E

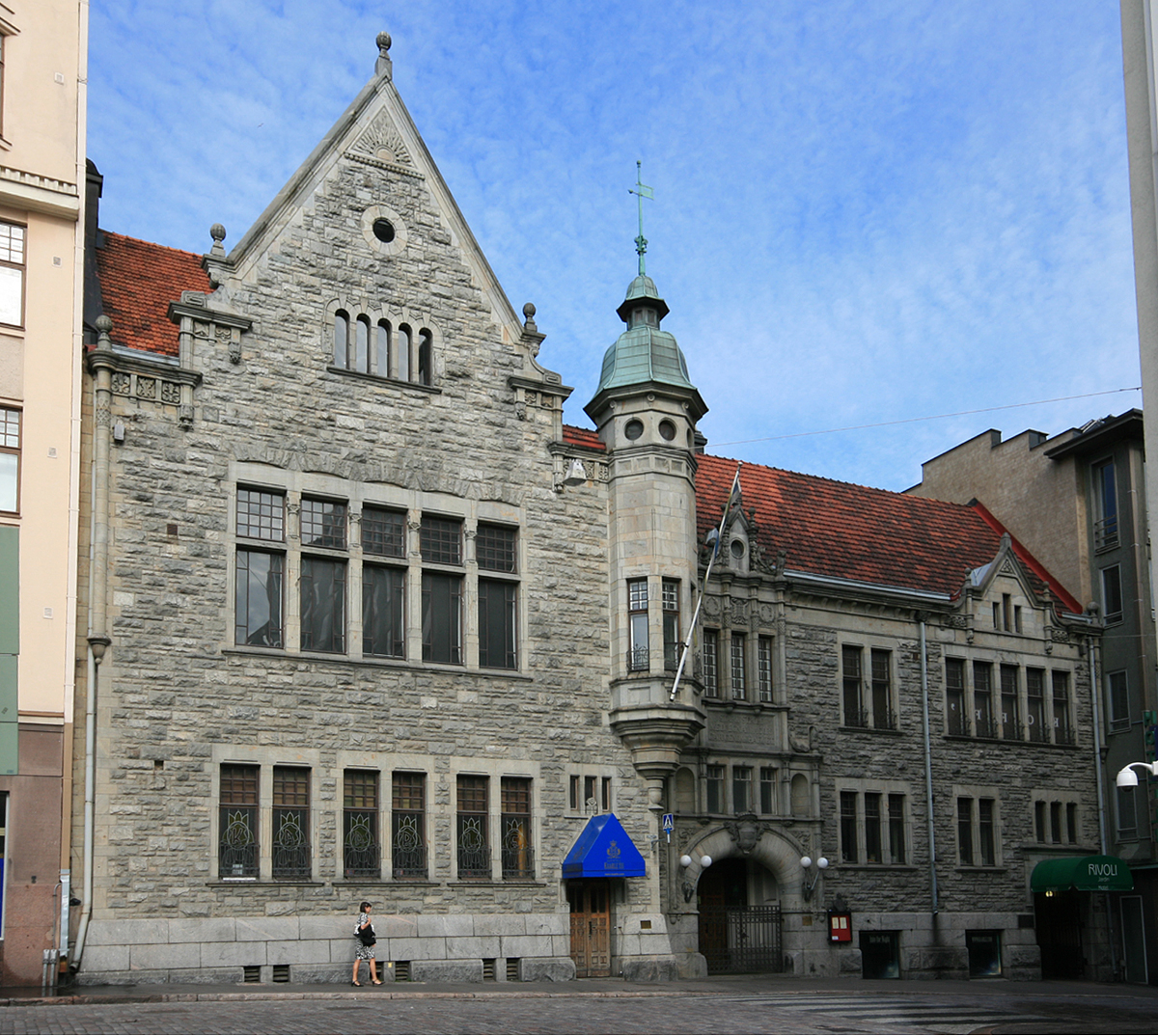
- Nationshuset, Nylands Nation's House, Kaserngatan 40
- Latin name: Natio Nylandica
- Abbreviation: NN
- Formation: 1643
- Inspector: Tom Böhling
- Members: ~800
- Address: Kasarmikatu 40; 00130 Helsinki; Finland
- Website: nylandsnation.com

Student Nations at Helsinki University
- Nylands; Eteläsuomalainen; Savolainen; Karjalainen; Hämäläis; Keskisuomalainen; Kymenlaakson; Åbo; Varsinaissuomalainen; Satakuntalainen; Wiipurilainen; Östra Finlands; Etelä-Pohjalainen; Vasa; Pohjois-Pohjalainen

Nylands Nation (NN) is one of the 15 student nations at the University of Helsinki, Finland's oldest, Swedish-speaking and established in 1643 at The Royal Academy of Turku. In 1828, the Academy moved to Helsinki taking the name "University" and Nylands Nation moved there along with the other Nations. Since 1904 the house of Nylands Nation, a building designed by Karl Hård af Segerstad, has stood at Kasarmikatu 40.

== Founding and Evolution ==
Nylands Nation was established in 1643 as a nation for students originating from Nyland, in Turku. The Royal Academy in Turku, pioneered the concept of dividing students based on their province, a tradition inspired by universities in Paris and Italy from the 12th century. The concept of nations was designed to create a sense of belonging and identity among students.

Initially, the nation was known for its inspector, Georgius Alanus, who supervised student conduct and acted as a liaison between the university and students. Over time, the nation became more established and began organizing diverse programs for its members, ranging from cultural evenings to large-scale events.

== The House of Nations and Art Collection ==
The institution's physical presence was realized with the construction of its national house in 1901, designed by architect Karl Hård af Segerstad. The house showcased a "Viking hall" for gatherings and celebrations. The nation boasts an impressive art collection comprising paintings, sculptures, textiles, stained glass, and drawings. The collection also extends to the Viking mythologically inspired interior of the national house.

The institution's archive, housed at the National Library in Helsinki, contains materials spanning 170 years, offering insights into Nylands Nation's history. Unfortunately, archives from the Swedish era were lost in the Turku fire of 1827.

== Friendship nations ==
Nylands nation has close connections with a number of student nations and fraternities at several foreign universities.

=== Uppsala ===
- Södermanlands-Nerikes nation
- Värmlands nation
- Västgöta nation

=== Lund ===
- Wermlands nation

=== Linköping ===
- Wermlands nation

=== Copenhagen ===
- Studenterforeningen vid Kobenhavns universitet

=== Oslo ===
- Det norske studentersamfund

=== Stockholm ===
- Humanistiska föreningen vid Stockholms universitet

=== Berlin ===
- VBSt Lysistrata

=== Marburg ===
- Marburger Burschenschaft Arminia

=== Tartu ===
- Korporatsioon Filiae Patriae
- Korporatsioon Ugala

Nylands Nation also has a sister nation in Turku, Nyländska Nationen

== Inspectors ==
Nylands nation's inspectors
- Georg Alanus 1643-1655
- Samuel Hartman 1649-1653
- Petrus Bergius 1653-1655, 1655-1665
- Abraham Thauvonius 1665-1667
- Nils Tunander 1668-1679
- Daniel Achrelius 1679-1692
- Magnus Steen 1692-1695
- Christiern Alander 1695-1701
- Lars Tammelin 1701-1717
- Johan Thorwöste 1723-1737
- Herman Dietrich Spöring 1738-1747
- Carolus Mesterton 1748-1773
- Andreas Planman 1773-1800
- Frans Michael Franzén 1800-1811
- Johan Fredrik Wallenius 1811-1826
- Hans Henrik Fattenborg 1826-1831
- Johan Gabriel Linsén 1832-1840
- Alexander Blomqvist 1840-1847
- Immanuel Ilmoni 1847-1852
- Edvard Jonas Vilhelm af Brunér 1868-1870
- Carl Gustaf Estlander 1870-1884
- Axel Olof Freudenthal 1884-1886
- Rabbe Axel Wrede 1886-1895
- Maximus Videkind af Schultén 1895
- Rabbe Axel Wrede 1898-1900
- Jakob Wilhelm Chydenius 1900-1904
- Wilhelm Pipping 1904-1907
- Axel Gabriel Wallensköld 1907-1916
- Knut Hugo Pipping 1916-1924
- Elias Ragnar Furuhjelm 1924-1937
- Gunnar Castrén 1937-1945
- Hugo E. Pipping 1946-1950
- Bo Palmgren 1950-1960
- Georg Henrik von Wright 1961
- Nils Oker-Blom 1961-1968
- Jarl Gallen 1968-1971
- Carl Fredrik Meinander 1972-1978
- Henrik Wallgren 1978-1984
- Johan Järnefelt 1985-1992
- Carl G. Gahmberg 1992-2010
- Henrik Meinander 2010-2018
- Tom Böhling 2018-

=== Curators ===
- Fredrik Palmén, 2023-
- Iris Wrede, 2020-2023
- Anna Öhman, 2017-2020
- Ina Scheinin, 2014-2017
- Patrik Westerback, 2011-2014
- Axel Nyman, 2008-2011
- Jan D. Oker-Blom 2005-2008
- Jonas Sundman 2002-2005
- Charlotta af Hällström 1999-2002
- Kati Sandelin 1996-1999
