= Hämäläis-Osakunta =

Finnish student nation

Coordinates: 60°10′7″N 24°55′59″E

- Abbreviation: HO
- Formation: 1653
- Inspector: Tiina Paunio
- Address: Urho Kekkosen katu 4–6 D 00100 Helsinki; Finland
- Website: hamalais-osakunta.fi

Student Nations at Helsinki University
- Nylands; Eteläsuomalainen; Savolainen; Karjalainen; Hämäläis; Keskisuomalainen; Kymenlaakson; Åbo; Varsinaissuomalainen; Satakuntalainen; Wiipurilainen; Östra Finlands; Etelä-Pohjalainen; Vasa; Pohjois-Pohjalainen

Hämäläis-Osakunta (HO, colloquially Hämis) is one of the 15 student nations at the University of Helsinki, Finnish-speaking and established in 1653 at The Royal Academy of Turku. In 1828, the academy moved to Helsinki adopting the name university and Hämäläis-Osakunta moved there along with the other nations. HO represents the historic region of Tavastia (nowadays, roughly Pirkanmaa, Tavastia Proper and Päijänne Tavastia), so it recruits its members actively there. The building of the nation, built in 1931, is located in Kamppi, on Urho Kekkosen katu.

== Premises ==
Hämäläis-Osakunta owns the building Hämäläisten talo ("Tavastians' House" or loosely "Häme House") at Urho Kekkosen katu 4–8, across the street from the Kamppi Center. The first floor of 4 D is rented out to Tavastia Club and the four upper floors are reserved for use by the nation's members. The other staircases (4, 6 and 8) are also rented out by Hämäläisten ylioppilassäätiö (loosely "Häme Students' Foundation"), the foundation in charge for the real property of the nation. The nation has also a summer villa in Hausjärvi.

== Friendship organizations ==
Hämäläis-Osakunta has friendship pacts with five student nations and corporations at universities in Sweden, Estonia and Lithuania.

=== Sweden ===
- Uplands nation (University of Uppsala)
- Lunds nation (University of Lund)

=== Estonia ===
- Korp! Sakala (University of Tartu)
- Korp! Filiae Patriae (University of Tartu)

=== Lithuania ===
- Korp! Neo-Lithuania (University of Kaunas)

== Notable members ==
=== Honorary members ===
- Frans Eemil Sillanpää, writer, 1939 Nobel Literature Prize Laureate
- Juho Kusti Paasikivi, President of Finland 1946–1956
- Väinö Linna, writer, 1963 Nordic Council's Literature Prize Laureate
- Esko Rekola, Minister of Finance, Second Minister of Finance and Minister for Foreign Trade in five Cabinets (1963–1964, 1976–1977, 1977–1979, 1979–1982)
