= Karjalainen Osakunta =

Student nation at the University of Helsinki

- Abbreviation: KO
- Formation: 1905
- Inspector: Risto Hotulainen
- Address: Perhonkatu 6; 00100 Helsinki; Finland
- Website: https://karjalainenosakunta.fi/

Student Nations at Helsinki University
- Nylands; Eteläsuomalainen; Savolainen; Karjalainen; Hämäläis; Keskisuomalainen; Kymenlaakson; Åbo; Varsinaissuomalainen; Satakuntalainen; Wiipurilainen; Östra Finlands; Etelä-Pohjalainen; Vasa; Pohjois-Pohjalainen

Karjalainen Osakunta (KO) is one of the 15 student nations at the University of Helsinki, Finnish-speaking and established in 1905.
