= Wiipurilainen Osakunta =

- Abbreviation: WiO
- Formation: 1653
- Inspector: Jussi Pakkasvirta
- Address: Leppäsuonkatu 11; 00100 Helsinki; Finland
- Website: wiipurilainenosakunta.fi

Student Nations at Helsinki University
- Nylands; Eteläsuomalainen; Savolainen; Karjalainen; Hämäläis; Keskisuomalainen; Kymenlaakson; Åbo; Varsinaissuomalainen; Satakuntalainen; Wiipurilainen; Östra Finlands; Etelä-Pohjalainen; Vasa; Pohjois-Pohjalainen

Wiipurilainen Osakunta (WiO) is one of the 15 student nations at the University of Helsinki, Finnish-speaking and established in 1653. WiO is the oldest of the Finnish-speaking student nations.
