= Karl Hård af Segerstad =

Finnish architect

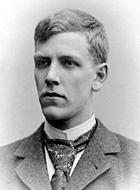
Karl Hård af Segerstad

Karl Hård af Segerstad (28 January 1873, Helsinki – 22 October 1931, Helsinki) was a Finnish architect. He came from a Swedish family, but lived and worked his whole life in Finland, mainly in Helsinki and Viipuri (which was taken from Finland by the Soviet Union in 1944 and today lies in Russia). He was appointed city architect of Helsinki in 1907. One of his most famous works is the Nylands Nation building (1899–1901) at the University of Helsinki in Helsinki.

== Life ==
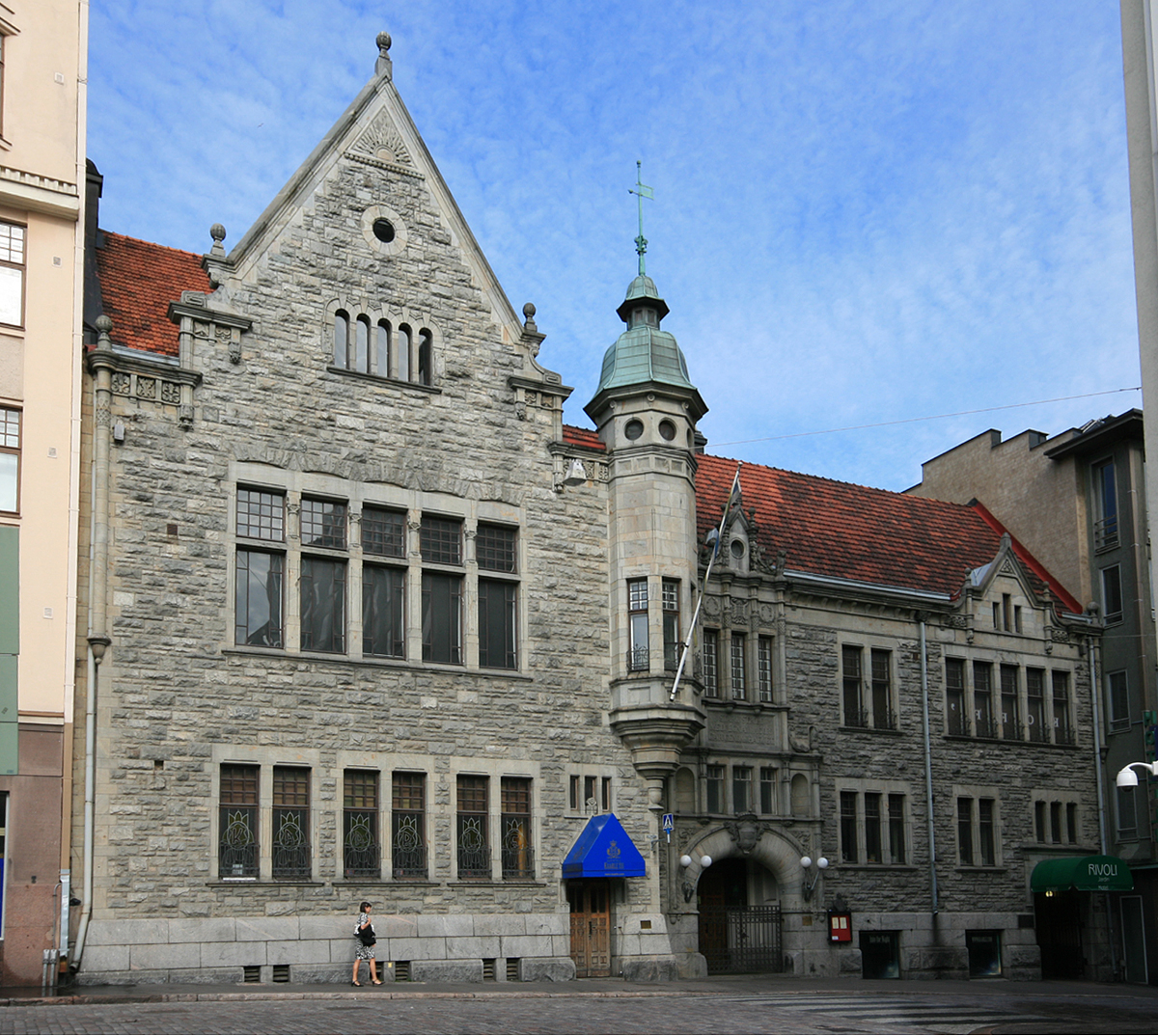
The Nylands Nation building in Helsinki (1898–1901)

Both of Karl Hård af Segerstad's parents were Swedish nationals, and throughout his life he retained strong ties to Sweden, although he was born and lived in Finland. He studied architecture at the Polytechnic Institute in Helsinki, graduating in 1895. A year later, he received his Finnish citizenship. As a student, he worked for the architectural firms Kiseleff & Heikel (the firm of Konstantin Kiseleff and Elia Heikel) and Grahn, Hedman & Wasastjerna (the firm of architects Karl Gustaf Grahn, Ernst Gustaf Hedman and Knut Wasastjerna). After he graduated, he founded his own architectural firm and then worked as an independent architect for several years. In 1902 he was appointed deputy county architect of Viipuri Province, and in 1907 he was made city architect of Helsinki. His high demands on himself led to a quickly deteriorating health and he died in Helsinki in 1931 at the age of 58.

== Architecture ==
Hård af Segerstad's architecture takes its inspiration mainly from contemporary Swedish and German architecture, and to a lesser degree from the National Romantic style which was popular among many contemporary Finnish architects. The Châteauesque-style Nylands Nation building (1898–1901) in Helsinki has been described as his most accomplished work. During his time in Vyborg, he designed both tenement houses and a large covered market building. After his return to Helsinki he continued designing schools, a library, and another covered market. At city architect of Helsinki, he was in part responsible for social housing and planning issues.
