= Domus Academica =

Student housing complex in Helsinki, Finland

Coordinates: 60°10′11″N 24°55′21″E

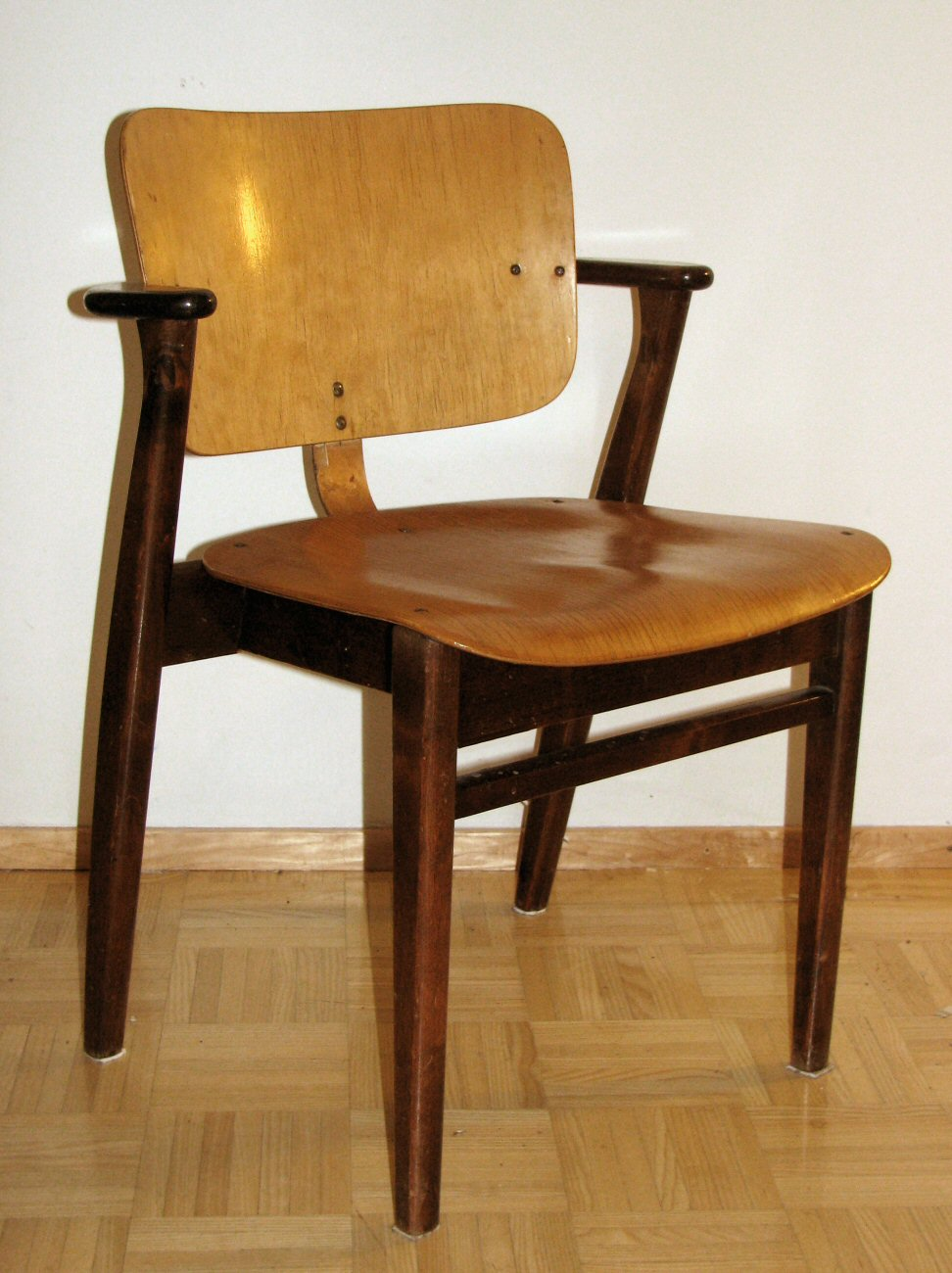
Domus chair

Domus Academica, colloquially called Domma, is a student housing complex in the center of Helsinki, Finland, owned by the Student Union of the University of Helsinki. It offers various services for students and also houses various Student Union organisations.

The complex is internationally known for the Domus chair originally designed by Ilmari Tapiovaara for the building.
