= Satakuntalainen Osakunta =

Student nation at the Helsinki University

- Abbreviation: SatO
- Formation: 1654
- Inspector: Jari Yli-Kauhaluoma
- Members: approx. 190
- Address: Lapinrinne 1 A5; 00180 Helsinki; Finland
- Website: satakuntalainen osakunta.fi

Student Nations at Helsinki University
- Nylands; Eteläsuomalainen; Savolainen; Karjalainen; Hämäläis; Keskisuomalainen; Kymenlaakson; Åbo; Varsinaissuomalainen; Satakuntalainen; Wiipurilainen; Östra Finlands; Etelä-Pohjalainen; Vasa; Pohjois-Pohjalainen

Satakuntalainen Osakunta (SatO) is one of the 15 student nations at the University of Helsinki. It was established in 1654. The nation is headed by the inspector and the curator. The current inspector is Jari Yli-Kauhaluoma, Professor of Pharmaceutical Chemistry at University of Helsinki. The curators are elected by the membership for a term of two years.

The nation works for the benefit of Satakunta and Finnish society and promotes the well-being its membership. The nation's activities have varied in history, but some traditions have remained the same for centuries. The activities of the nation are characteristically marked by the joy associated with youth, growing into active and responsible citizens and the work done for the home province.

The center of the nation's operations is Satakuntatalo, located in Kamppi, Helsinki. The Satalinna Foundation located at the same address maintains a dormitory for the nation's student members. The building has about 70 dorm rooms. They are available primarily for students from Satakunta region residents studying at universities in the Helsinki metropolitan area, but they can be also rented to other Finnish and foreign students based on availability.

The nation has been publishing a Finnish-language magazine called Karhunkierros since 1963. The magazine is published four times a year, both online and in print. During its history, the nation has had a mixed choir, a male choir and an orchestra. The current mixed choir has been operating since 1999.
