= Teknologföreningen =

Student nation at Aalto University

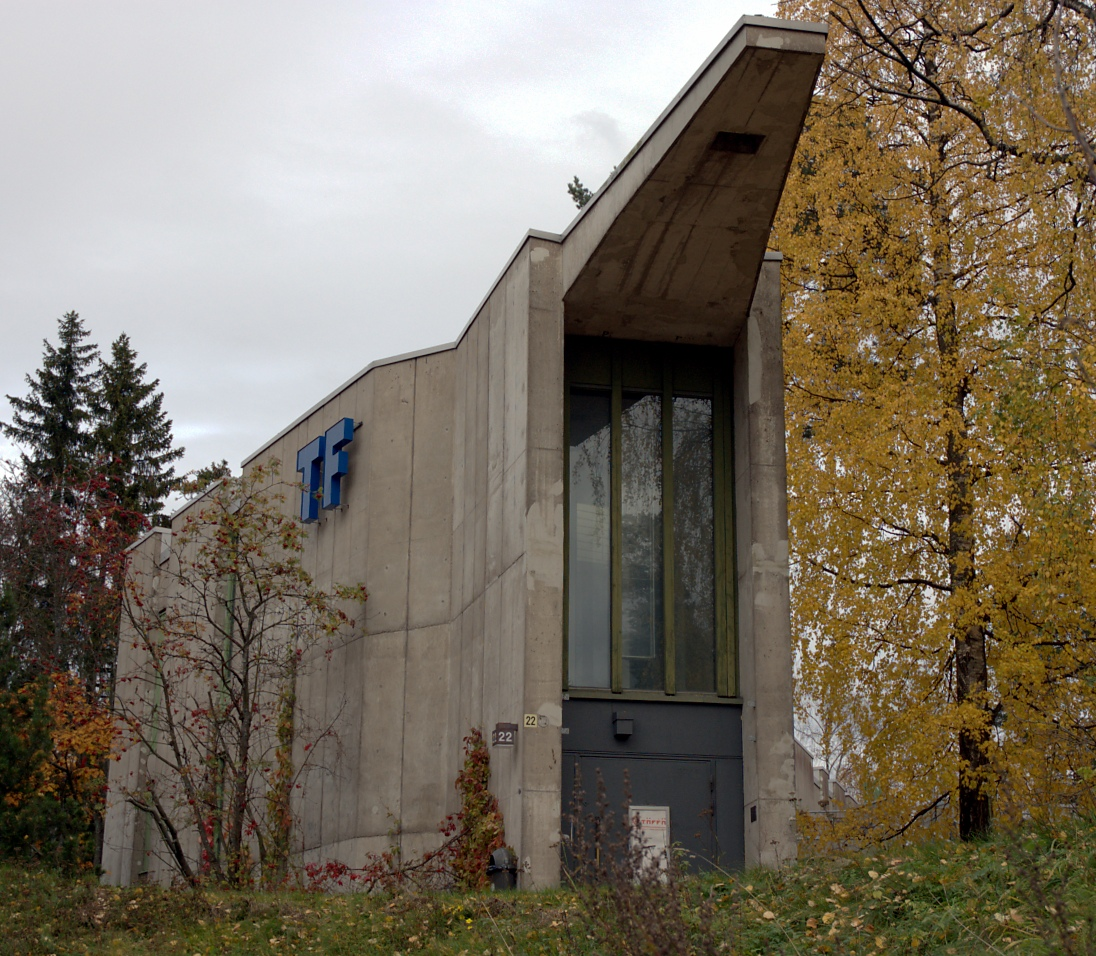
- Teknologföreningen's Urdsgjallar building at the Aalto University campus
- Formation: 1872; 154 years ago
- Type: Student nation
- Headquarters: Urdsgjällar (Otakaari 22, 02150 Espoo, Finland)
- Members: Approximately 750 regular members and 850 alumni members
- Website: tf.fi

Teknologföreningen (commonly abbreviated TF) is the Swedish-speaking student nation at Aalto University, serving as a community for the university's Swedish-speaking students. Teknologföreningen was founded in 1872 by and for students of the Helsinki University of Technology. Language strifes within the early association led Finnish-speaking students to separate and form their own association, which eventually became the university's student union, leaving TF primarily for Swedish speakers. Today Teknologföreningen is the only student nation at Aalto University and the only statutory student nation in Finland outside the University of Helsinki.

== Urdsgjallar ==
Teknologföreningen operates on the Aalto University campus in its own building named Urdsgjallar, which was designed by architect Kurt Moberg (1932–2016) and completed in 1966. It is one of the most renowned examples of Finnish concrete brutalism. The building has fallen into poor condition and is planned to be completely renovated. In 2020, Teknologföreningen was planning to demolish the old building entirely despite the Finnish Heritage Agency's objections, as the nation in conjunction with the Aalto University Student Union and the business students' association KY were planning to build a new joint student house closer to the campus center. However, in late 2023 Teknologföreningen decided to continue using Urdsgjallar indefinitely, and plans for the new student house were cancelled in 2024 due to rising costs in construction. The nation now plans to construct a new building for student housing which would partially surround and connect to Urdsgjallar and which would finance its renovation.
