= Ilmari Tapiovaara =

Finnish designer

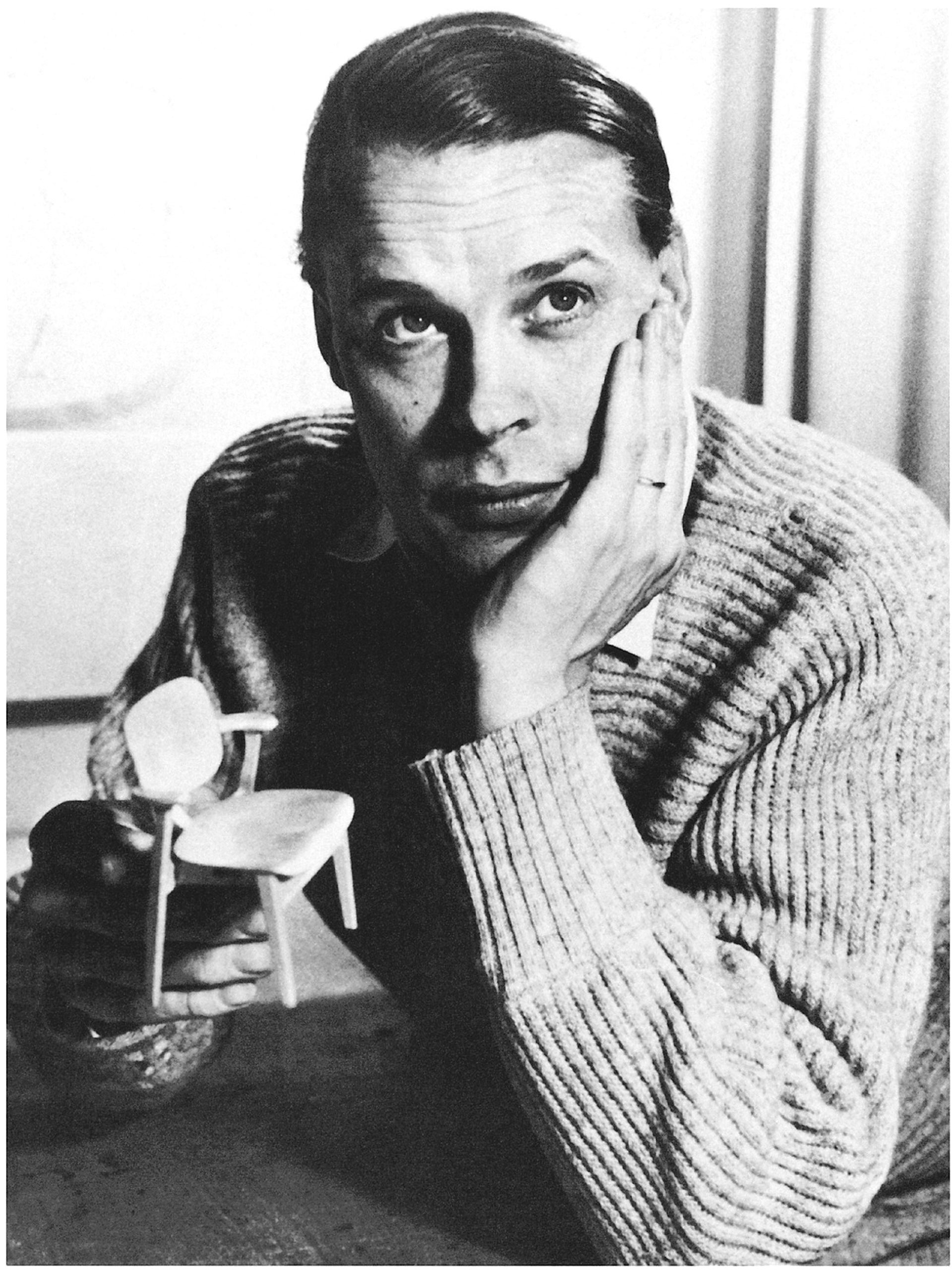
- Born: 7 September 1914
- Died: 31 January 1999 (aged 84)
- Education: Interior Design
- Occupation: Designer
- Known for: Furniture and textile design
- Notable work: Domus chair

Yrjö Ilmari Tapiovaara (September 7, 1914 – January 31, 1999) was a Finnish designer noted for his furnishings and textiles.

== Education and work ==
In 1937 he graduated in interior design and in the following year worked for Asko. He would count Alvar Aalto as a strong influence. In World War II, Tapiovaara designed dugouts and field furniture to the Finnish Army, a challenging task given that only local wood and simple tools could be used, and no nails or screws were available. His own work gained attention for the Domus chairs. These came about while working with his wife at the Domus Academica from 1946 to 1947. The couple established their own office in 1951. In the following year, he taught design at the Illinois Institute of Technology. After this, he would do work in Paraguay and Mauritius on behalf of a United Nations development program. Further in 1959 he received the Order of the Lion of Finland's "Pro-Finlandia medal", and in 1964 a gold medal at the Milan Triennial XIII for his Polar cutlery. He did much of his work for universities, schools, and also did a "Root Table" for the Finnish army. Furniture designs based on his sketches continued to be produced into the twenty-first century.

== Literature ==
- Svenskberg, Aila (ed.): Ilmari Tapiovaara: Life and Design. Translated by Jüri Kokkonen. Helsinki: Designmuseo, 2014. ISBN 978-952-9878-84-0
