= Eteläsuomalainen osakunta =

Student nation at the University of Helsinki

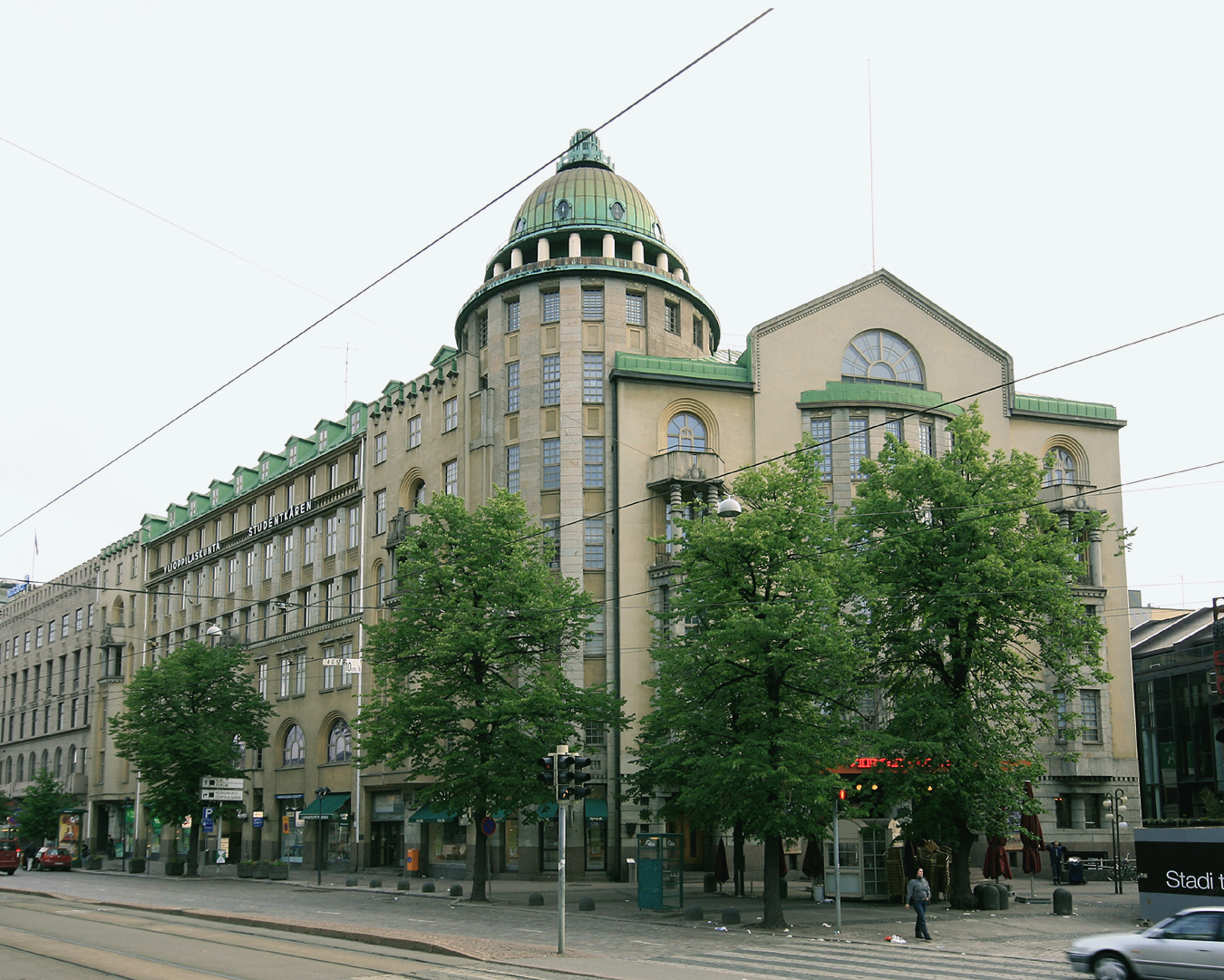
- ESO at Uusi Ylioppilastalo
- Abbreviation: ESO
- Formation: 1 May, 1905 (secession from NN, est. in 1643)
- Inspector: Tuomas Heikkilä
- Address: Mannerheimintie 5 A 00100 Helsinki; Finland
- Website: etelasuomalainen osakunta.fi

Student Nations at Helsinki University
- Nylands; Eteläsuomalainen; Savolainen; Karjalainen; Hämäläis; Keskisuomalainen; Kymenlaakson; Åbo; Varsinaissuomalainen; Satakuntalainen; Wiipurilainen; Östra Finlands; Etelä-Pohjalainen; Vasa; Pohjois-Pohjalainen

Eteläsuomalainen osakunta (ESO) is one of the 15 student nations at the University of Helsinki, Finnish-speaking, established in 1905 and it has Uusimaa and Eastern Uusimaa as recruitment regions. Before 1905, Nylands Nation (NN) gathered both Finnish- and Swedish-speaking university students from Southern Finland, but seceded from NN in 1905 to form a similar, but Finnish-speaking nation.

== Premises ==
ESO has its premises in downtown Helsinki, at Uusi Ylioppilastalo, at Mannerheimintie 5, alongside four other Nations, Savolainen osakunta, Varsinaissuomalainen osakunta, Åbo Nation and Östra Finlands Nation.

== Friendship nations ==
The Nation has friendship contracts with several student nations, student associations and student societies at universities in Finland, Estonia, Sweden, Denmark, Norway and Germany.

=== Finland ===
- Nylands Nation (University of Helsinki)
- Sähköinsinöörikilta (Aalto University)

=== Estonia ===
- Eesti Üliõpilaste Selts Põhjala
- Estonian Women Students' Society

=== Sweden ===
- Malmö nation (University of Lund)
- Stockholms nation (University of Uppsala)
- Värmlands nation (University of Uppsala)

=== Denmark ===
- Studenterforeningen (University of Copenhagen)

=== Norway ===
- Det Norske Studentersamfund (University of Oslo)

=== Germany ===
- Der Allgemeine Studierenden Ausschuss der Johannes Gutenberg Universität Mainz (University of Mainz)
