= Åbo Nation =

Finnish student organization

Coordinates: 60°10′10″N 024°57′00″E

- Latin name: Natio Aboensis
- Abbreviation: ÅN
- Formation: 1906
- Inspector: Anu Lahtinen
- Address: Mannerheimintie 5 A 00100 Helsinki; Finland
- Website: abonation.fi

Student Nations at Helsinki University
- Nylands; Eteläsuomalainen; Savolainen; Karjalainen; Hämäläis; Keskisuomalainen; Kymenlaakson; Åbo; Varsinaissuomalainen; Satakuntalainen; Wiipurilainen; Östra Finlands; Etelä-Pohjalainen; Vasa; Pohjois-Pohjalainen

Åbo Nation (ÅN) is one of the 15 student nations at the University of Helsinki, it is Swedish-speaking and was established in 1906.
