= Keskisuomalainen Osakunta =

Student body at the University of Helsinki

- Abbreviation: KSO
- Formation: 1931
- Inspector: Juha Raitio
- Address: Perhonkatu 6, 2. krs 00100 Helsinki; Finland
- Website: kso.fi

Student Nations at Helsinki University
- Nylands; Eteläsuomalainen; Savolainen; Karjalainen; Hämäläis; Keskisuomalainen; Kymenlaakson; Åbo; Varsinaissuomalainen; Satakuntalainen; Wiipurilainen; Östra Finlands; Etelä-Pohjalainen; Vasa; Pohjois-Pohjalainen

Keskisuomalainen Osakunta (KSO) is one of the 15 student nations at the University of Helsinki, Finnish-speaking and established in 1931.
