= Varsinaissuomalainen osakunta =

Student nation at the University of Helsinki, Finland

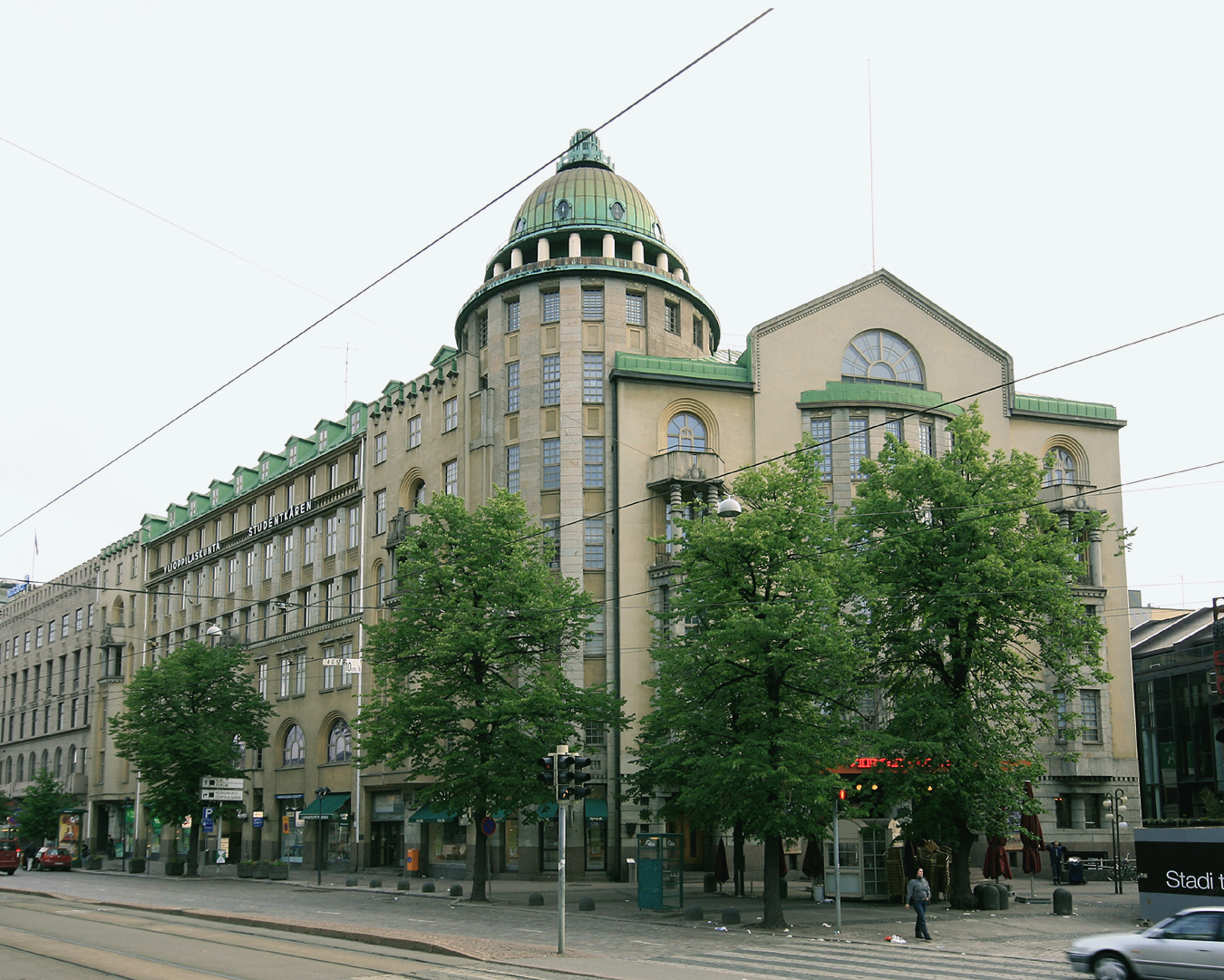
- VSO at Uusi Ylioppilastalo
- Latin name: Natio Fennica
- Abbreviation: VSO
- Formation: 1906
- Inspector: Samu Niskanen
- Address: Mannerheimintie 5 A 00100 Helsinki; Finland
- Website: varsinaissuomalainen.fi

Student Nations at Helsinki University
- Nylands; Eteläsuomalainen; Savolainen; Karjalainen; Hämäläis; Keskisuomalainen; Kymenlaakson; Åbo; Varsinaissuomalainen; Satakuntalainen; Wiipurilainen; Östra Finlands; Etelä-Pohjalainen; Vasa; Pohjois-Pohjalainen

Varsinaissuomalainen osakunta (VSO) is one of the 15 student nations at the University of Helsinki, Finnish-speaking, established in 1906.
