= Gunnar Rudberg =

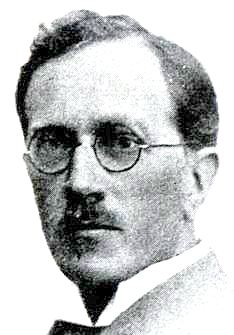
Gunnar Rudberg

Gunnar Rudberg (17 October 1880 – 6 August 1954) was an internationally renowned Swedish classical philologist. He was the father of geomorphologist Sten Rudberg.

== Life ==
In 1919, after being associate professor of Greek Language and Literature in Uppsala, Rudberg became Professor of Classical Philology in Oslo. From 1933 until his retirement in 1945 he was Professor of Greek Language and Literature in Uppsala.

Rudberg contributed to the scientific journal for Classical Philology Eranos – Acta philologica Suecana. With Samson Eitrem he edited the scientific journal Symbolæ osloenses.

== Works ==
- Poseidonios från Apameia (1916)
- Atlantis och Syrakusai (1917), English: Atlantis and Syracuse (2012) ISBN 978-3-8482-2822-5
- Forschungen zu Poseidonios (1918)
- Kristus och Platon (1920)
- Platon, hans person och verk (1922)
- Poseidonios, en Hellenismens Lærer og Profet (1924)
- Kring Platons Phaidros (1924)
- Hellas och Nya Testamentet (1929)
- Platonica selecta, with Postscript of his son Folke Rudberg (1956, English)
