= Nations in Finnish universities =

Student organizations

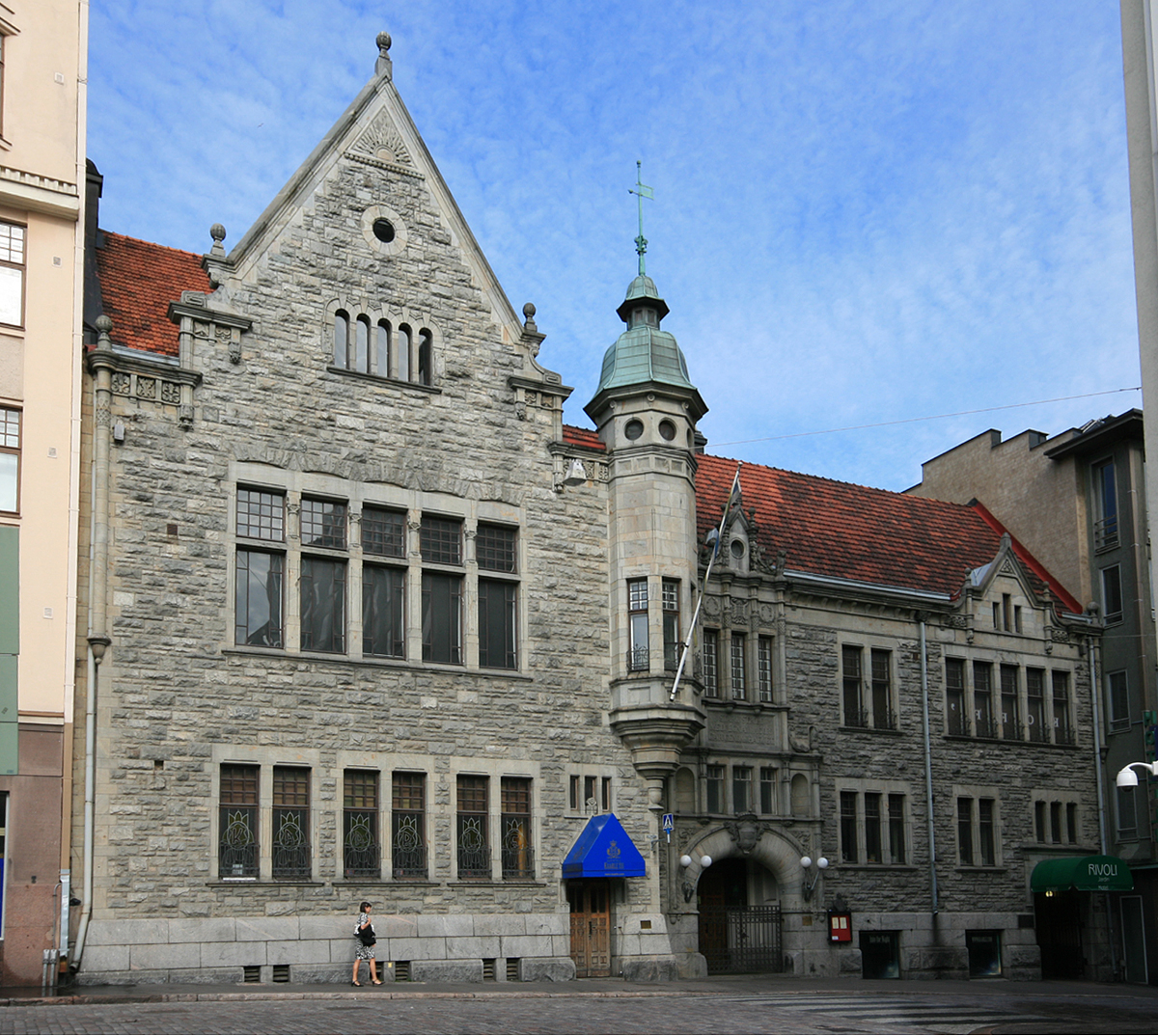
The House of Nylands Nation, at Kasarmikatu 4, Helsinki

In Finland, student nations (in Finnish, sg. osakunta, pl. osakunnat; in Swedish (student)nation) are student organisations within which a large proportion of extra-curricular student activity takes place. Though membership is not compulsory, the nations provide one of the main nodes of student social life, along with the faculty-based student organisations (tiedekuntajärjestöt) and subject-based student organisations (ainejärjestöt) at the universities.

The first Finnish student nations were originally established at The Royal Academy of Turku. When the Academy moved to Helsinki after the Great Fire of Turku taking the name Imperial Alexander University in Finland, the nations moved along with it. Their institutional form is based on the original nation system of Uppsala University.

After Finland had gained its independence from Russia, the university was renamed as the University of Helsinki. Today there are 15 nations, each one representing a historic region or province of Finland. Four of these nations represent Swedish-speaking regions which overlay some of the remaining 12 regions, which are Finnish-speaking regions. For example, Åbo Nation and Varsinaissuomalainen osakunta ("Finland Proper Nation") both represent a very similar geographic region, though the former is Swedish-speaking and the latter Finnish-speaking. In addition to the nations at Helsinki University, there is also an association for Swedish-speaking students, Teknologföreningen, at Aalto University, and it is also legally a nation.

The 16 nations, those at Helsinki University and Teknologföreningen, have a special legal status as their existence and overall purpose is regulated by the Universities Act. Therefore, organizations termed "nations" at other Finnish universities founded in the 20th century are not nations in the legal sense of the word, but instead associations, regulated by the Associations Act. For example, at the University of Turku, there are four student nations established in the 1920s.

== Student nations at the University of Helsinki ==
=== Finnish-speaking ===
- Eteläsuomalainen osakunta (ESO)
- Savolainen osakunta (SavO)
- Karjalainen Osakunta (KO)
- Hämäläis-Osakunta (HO)
- Keskisuomalainen Osakunta (KSO)
- Kymenlaakson Osakunta (KyO)
- Varsinaissuomalainen osakunta (VSO)
- Satakuntalainen Osakunta (SatO)
- Wiipurilainen Osakunta (WiO)
- Etelä-Pohjalainen Osakunta (EPO)
- Pohjois-Pohjalainen Osakunta (PPO)

=== Swedish-speaking ===
- Nylands Nation (NN)
- Vasa nation (VN)
- Åbo Nation (ÅN)
- Östra Finlands Nation (ÖFN)

== Student nations at Åbo Akademi University ==
- Nyländska Nationen (NN)
- Åbolands Nation (ÅSNA)
- Åländska Studentlaget (ÅSL)
- Österbottniska Nationen (ÖN)
- Östra Finlands Nation (Öffen)

== Student nations at Aalto University ==
- Teknologföreningen (TF)

== Student nations at the University of Turku ==
- Satakuntalais-Hämäläinen Osakunta (SHO)
- Savokarjalainen Osakunta (SKO)
- Varsinaissuomalainen Osakunta (TVO)
- Pohjalainen Osakunta (TPO)
