= Student Union of the University of Helsinki =

Finnish student organisation

Coordinates: 60°10′09.7″N 024°56′24″E

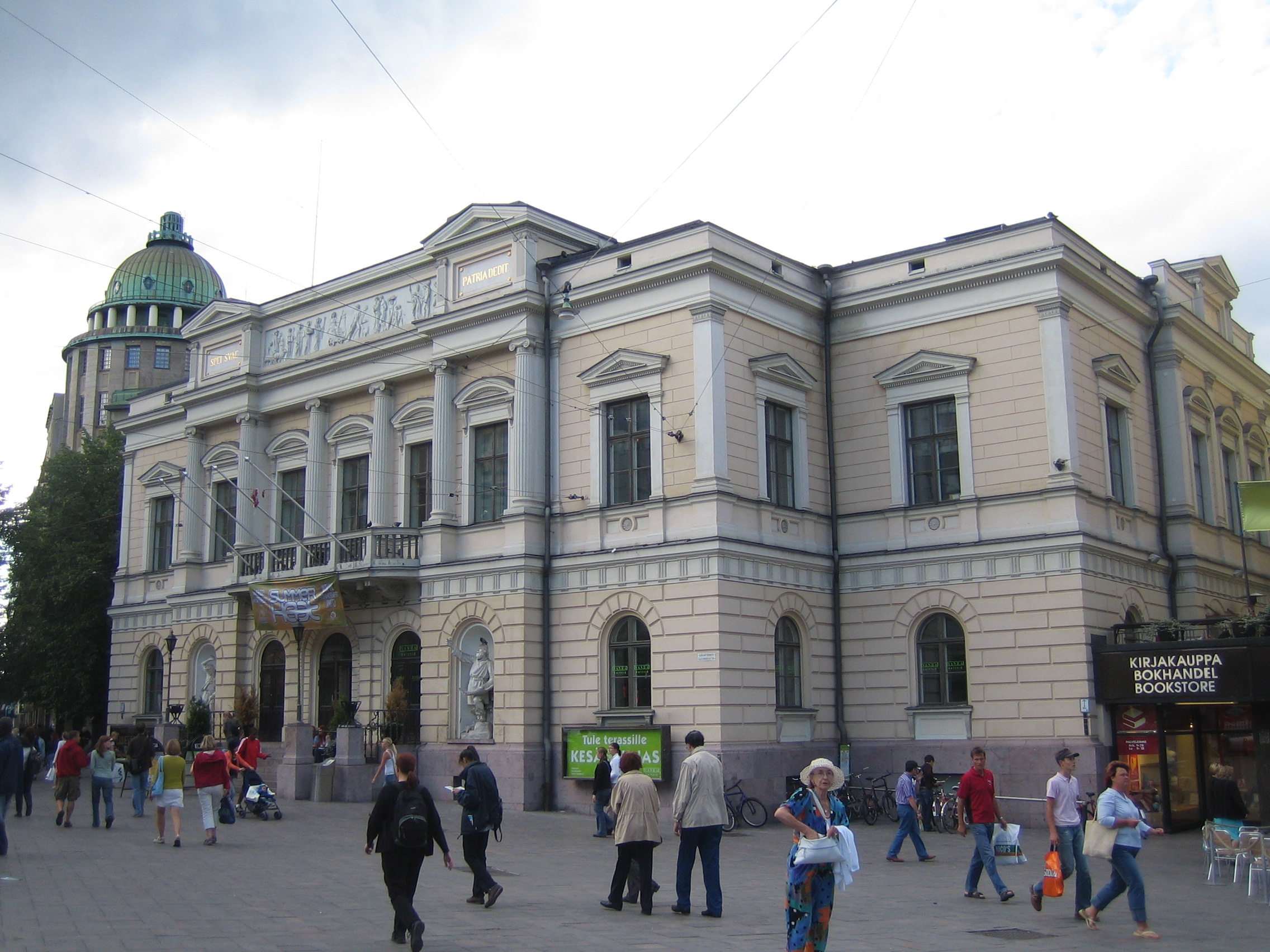
The old student house in downtown Helsinki.

The Student Union of the University of Helsinki (Finnish: Helsingin yliopiston ylioppilaskunta, HYY, Swedish: Studentkåren vid Helsingfors universitet, HUS) was founded in 1868. It has about 27,000 members.

The union used to be one of the world's richest student organizations, with assets of several hundred million euros. Among other things, it owns a good deal of property in the city centre of Helsinki.

However, in the 2020s, the financial situation of the union has quickly worsened due to the COVID-19 pandemic, the war in Ukraine, and the rising of interest rates affecting its real estate business. For the year 2025–2026, the union raised its membership fee from 57 to 85 euros. The fee is compulsory for all students of the university. According to the newspaper Helsingin Sanomat, banks are pressuring the union to sell its real estate assets while the markets are down, which would lead to substantial losses for the union.

The union has been at the centre of student politics from the 19th-century nationalist movements, through the actions of the New Left in the 1960s, up to the present. Its governing assembly consists of parties which are connected to faculty organisations, the Student Nations, and the mainstream political parties. In May 2019, HYY's finance board (talousjohtokunta) removed Hapsu ry, the university branch of the Finns Party’s youth organization Finns Party Youth, from its register because Hapsu ry had expressed the opinion that "European nations are white, so it is only natural and healthy that whiteness is dominant in European scientific communities".

== See also ==
- Old Student House, Helsinki
- New Student House, Helsinki
