= Celso =

Celso is a given name, a variant of Celsus. It may refer to:

== People ==
- Celso Sozzini (1517–1570), Italian freethinker
- Celso Mancini (1542–1612), Italian Roman Catholic prelate
- Celso Zani (1580-unknown), Italian Roman Catholic prelate
- Celso Golmayo Zúpide (1820–1898), Spanish-Cuban chess player
- Celso Caesar Moreno (1830–1901), Italian adventurer and political figure
- Afonso Celso, Viscount of Ouro Preto (1836–1912), Brazilian politician and last Prime Minister of the Empire of Brazil
- Celso Ceretti (1844–1919), Italian anarchist and socialist politician
- Celso Benigno Luigi Costantini (1876–1958), Italian Roman Catholic cardinal
- Celso Lagar (1891–1966), Spanish painter
- Celso de Freitas (1912–1970), Guyanese cricketer
- Celso Emilio Ferreiro (1912–1979), Spanish Galicianist activist writer and politician
- Celso Peçanha (1916–2016), Brazilian politician, lawyer and journalist
- Celso Furtado (1920–2004), Brazilian economist
- Celso Brant (1920–2004), Brazilian politician
- Celso Battaia (1920–2007), Italian football midfielder
- Celso-Ramón García (1922–2014), Spanish-American physician
- Celso Garrido Lecca (1926–2025), Peruvian composer
- Celso Pereira de Almeida (1928–2014), Brazilian Roman Catholic bishop
- Celso Posio (1931–2016), Italian football midfielder
- Celso Torrelio (1933–1999), Paraguayan military general and former President of Paraguay
- Celso Yegros Estigarribia (1935–2013), Paraguayan Roman Catholic bishop
- Zé Celso (1937–2023), José Celso Martinez Corrêa, Brazilian actor, director and playwright
- Celso Murilo (born 1940), Brazilian musician, composer and arranger
- Celso Lafer (born 1941), Brazilian jurist, professor and politician
- Celso Amorim (born 1942), Brazilian diplomat
- Celso Ad. Castillo (1943–2012), Filipino director and screenwriter
- Celso Scarpini (1944–2022), Brazilian basketball player
- Adu Celso (1945–2005), Brazilian motorcycle road racer
- Celso Pitta (1946–2009), Brazilian economist and politician
- Celso Grebogi (born 1947), Brazilian theoretical physicist
- Celso Zubire (born 1947), Mexican artist
- Celso de Matos (born 1947), Portuguese football midfielder
- Celso Bugallo (1947–2025), Spanish actor
- Celso Lobregat (born 1948), Filipino politician
- Celso Morga Iruzubieta (born 1948), Spanish Roman Catholic archbishop
- Celso Costa (born 1949), Brazilian mathematician
- Celso de Moraes (born 1949), Brazilian hammer thrower
- Celso Valli (born 1950), Italian composer
- Celso Ferreira (born 1950), known as Celsinho, Brazilian football forward
- Celso Brandão (born 1951), Brazilian photographer and director
- Celso Daniel (1951–2002), Brazilian mayor
- Celso Dayrit (1951–2021), Filipino fencer and sports executive
- Celso Frateschi (born 1952), Brazilian actor, director, and politician
- Celso Marranzini (born 1952), Dominican economist and diplomat
- Celso Piña (1953–2019), Mexican singer, composer and accordionist
- Celso Machado (born 1953), Brazilian guitarist and multi-instrumentalist
- Claudio Celso (born 1955), Brazilian guitarist and composer
- Celso Fonseca (born 1956), Brazilian musician composer, guitarist and producer
- Celso Russomanno (born 1956), Brazilian reporter and politician
- Celso Blues Boy (1956–2012), Brazilian singer-songwriter and guitarist
- Celso Gavião (born 1956), Brazilian football centre-back goalkeeper
- Celso Morales (born 1957), Chilean politician
- Celso Roth (born 1957), Brazilian football manager and football midfielder
- Celso Giardini (born 1958), Italian sports shooter
- Celso Otero (born 1958), Uruguayan football manager and former
- Celso Güity (1958–2021), Honduran football forward
- Celso Al. Carunungan (fl. 1959–1982), Filipino writer and screenwriter
- Celso Jaque (born 1960), Argentine politician
- Celso Luis Gomes (born 1964), Brazilian football defender
- Celso Portiolli (born 1967), Brazilian television presenter and broadcaster
- Celso Ayala (born 1970), Paraguayan football manager and former centre-back
- Celso Guerrero (born 1971), Paraguayan football manager and former goalkeeper
- Celso Riva (born 1974), Italian video game designer
- Celso Duarte (born 1974), Paraguayan harpist, singer and instrumentalist
- Celso Vieira (born 1974), Brazilian football midfielder
- Celso Albelo (born 1976), Spanish operatic tenor
- Celso Brum Junior (born 1978), Brazilian volleyball player
- Celso Cardoso De Moraes (born 1979), known as Chika, Brazilian football defender
- Celso Esquivel (born 1981), Paraguayan football right-back
- Celso Míguez (born 1982), Spanish racing driver
- Celso Vinicius (born 1983), Brazilian jiu-jitsu competitor and mixed martial artist
- Celso Capdevila (born 1984), Paraguayan football goalkeeper
- Celso Oliveira (born 1988), Brazilian canoeist
- Celso Borges (born 1988), Costa Rican football midfielder
- Celso Ortiz (born 1989), Paraguayan football midfielder
- Celso Raposo (born 1996), Portuguese football right-back
- Celso Sidney (born 2001), Portuguese footballer
- El Celso (fl.2009-present), American post-graffiti artist
- Celso Arango (fl. 2011-present), Spanish psychiatrist

== Places ==
- Celso Ramos, municipality in Santa Catarina, Brazil
- Santi Celso e Giuliano, basilica in Rome, Italy
- Santa Maria presso San Celso, church in Milan, Italy

== See also ==
- Lo Celso, surname
