= Celsus (disambiguation) =

Celsus may refer to:

- Celsus (or Kelsos, c. 177 AD) an opponent of Christianity quoted by Origen
- Aulus Cornelius Celsus (c. 25 BC – c. 50 AD), an encyclopedist best known for his medical writings
- Aulus Marius Celsus, a Roman senator whose career began under Nero
- Tiberius Julius Celsus Polemaeanus, commonly known as Celsus (ca. 45 – before ca. 120); Roman senator, consul. Ephesus
- Publius Juventius Celsus (AD 67– AD 130), a Roman jurist, praetor, governor, consul
- Tiberius Julius Candidus Marius Celsus, a.k.a. Tiberius Julius Candidus; a Roman senator who lived during the Flavian dynasty.
- Saint Celsus (a.k.a. Celestinus or Cellach of Armagh), 1080–1129 AD); archbishop of Armagh
- Celsus and Marcionilla early Christian martyrs (in the time of Diocletian); Celsus, young son of Marcionilla.
- Celsus, a martyr; see Nazarius and Celsus: bodies discovered by Saint Ambrose.
- Celsus (usurper) (a.k.a. Titus Cornelius Celsus), a fictional Roman usurper, who supposedly rebelled against Gallienus. One of the Thirty Tyrants of Trebellius Pollio
- Library of Celsus

== See also ==
- Celsius (disambiguation)
- Celso (disambiguation)
- Paracelsus
