= Celsius (disambiguation) =

Celsius is a temperature scale named after Anders Celsius and is used in most places around the world.

Celsius may also refer to:

- Celsius (character), a DC Comics superhero
- Celsius (crater), a lunar crater
- 4169 Celsius, an asteroid
- Celsius Mission, the flight of Swedish ESA astronaut Christer Fuglesang to the International Space Station
- Celsius, an airship in Final Fantasy X-2
- Celsius, a spirit in Tales of Symphonia and other Tales games
- Fujitsu Celsius, a line of workstation computers made by Fujitsu
- Celsius Network, a bankrupt cryptocurrency company and wallet
- Celsius Holdings, an energy drink company founded in 2004

== People with the surname ==
- Anders Celsius (1701–1744), Swedish astronomer and inventor of the Celsius temperature scale
- Magnus Celsius (1621–1679), Swedish astronomer and mathematician, grandfather of Anders Celsius
- Olof Celsius (1670–1756), Swedish botanist, philologist and clergyman, uncle of Anders Celsius
- Celsius family, the Swedish family to which Anders Celsius belongs

== See also ==
- Celcius (album), a rap album by Tech N9ne
