= Olof Celsius the Younger =

Swedish priest and historian (1716–1794)

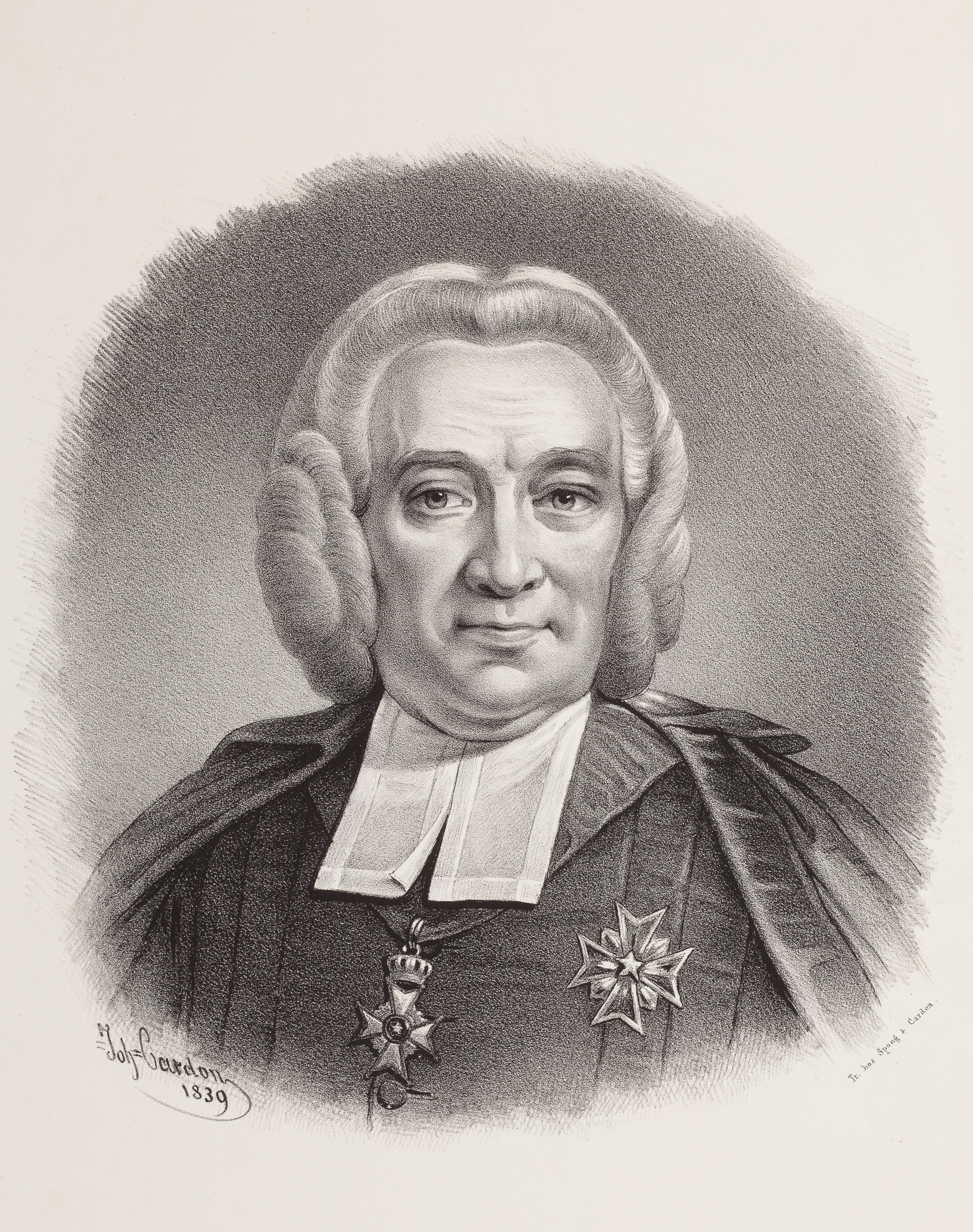
- Lithograph of Celsius from 1839.
- Diocese: Diocese of Lund
- In office: 1777–1794
- Predecessor: Johan Engeström
- Successor: Petrus Munck

Personal details
- Born: 15 December 1716
- Died: 15 February 1794 (aged 77)
- Parents: Olof Celsius
- Education: Uppsala University

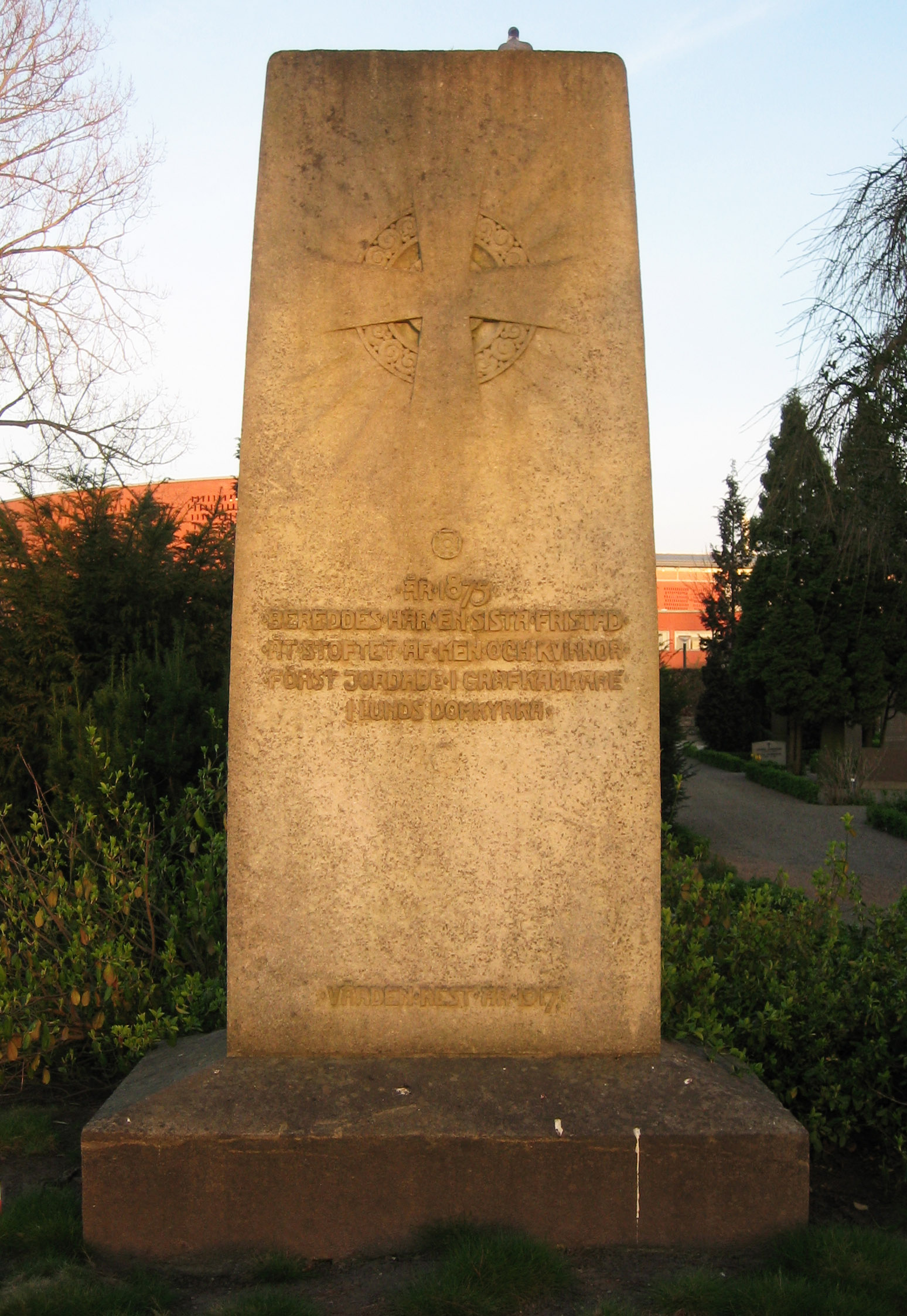
Celsius' remains lie in this mass grave at Norra kyrkogården in Lund, Sweden.

Olof Celsius the Younger (15 December 1716 – 15 February 1794) was a Swedish civil servant, church official, politician and historian. He was professor of history at Uppsala University from 1747, bishop of the Diocese of Lund from 1777, and member of the Swedish Academy from 1786. He was the son of Olof Celsius and cousin of Anders Celsius.

== Biography ==
Celsius was born in Uppsala, Sweden, to botanist Olof Celsius and Margareta Insulander. In 1740 Celsius received his Master of Philosophy. In 1742 he became docent in history of education, in 1744 deputy librarian and in 1747 professor of history at Uppsala University. After being ordained as a priest, he received his Doctor of Theology in 1752. In 1753 he was appointed vicar of the parish of Kungsholmen and in 1760 of Jakob and Johannes Parish in Stockholm. In 1774 he became vicar of the Storkyrko parish and in 1777 was promoted to bishop of Lund. Among his friends were priest Ebbe Bring and bishop Thure Weidman.

In 1756 he was knighted along with his siblings. His children adopted the name von Celse.

Celsius was a prolific writer. His youthful tragedy Ingeborg was written during his years as a student (1737), and is notable as one of the first French classical dramas in Sweden. In 1738 he attempted to give Olof von Dalin's weekly journal Then Swänska Argus a successor, and published Thet swenska nitet. The attempt failed, but Celsius became the first to introduce literary criticism in his journal. As a member of the Uppsala Society of Science, he also published many historical articles in his Tidningar om the lärdas arbeten, self-published in 1742. A major heroic poem, Gustaf Vasa (1774), was less successful, as were some hymns and translations of alexandrines from classical authors. As an orator, Celsius had a great reputation, both in academic eloquence and politics. In 1745 he published Bibliothecæ upsaliensis historia, which was in many ways a hastily produced work, but for a long time remained the only work of its kind.

However, Celsius' literary and scientific activities were mainly devoted to historical works. He is one of the most important Swedish historians of the 18th century. Best known is his Konung Gustaf I:s historia (King Gustaf I's History; 1746–1753), which was printed in three editions. 1774 saw the publication of Konung Erik XIV:s historia (King Erik XIV's History). Both these works are well-written, but they lack thorough source research. In 1767, on behalf of the estates, Celsius published the beginning of Svea rikes kyrkohistoria, his main work. It begins with the death of Ansgar in 865 and covers up to 1022. Celsius' writing was so highly regarded that he was elected a member of the Swedish Academy when it was founded in 1786. In 1746 he had been appointed member number 103 of the Royal Swedish Academy of Sciences, where his father was also a member. He was president of the Christian society Pro Fide et Christianismo in 1776 and 1777. From 1763 to 1770 he was a member of the hymnal committee and in 1770 a member of the education commission.

He was appointed by Gustav III as one of Crown Prince Gustav Adolf's godparents at his baptism on 10 November 1778 and received Gustav III's royal jubilee commemorative medal at the Queen's churching on 27 December 1778. On 15 January 1788, Celsius became an honorary member of the Royal Swedish Academy of Letters, History and Antiquities.

=== Political activity ===
Celsius also played a significant role in politics due to his eloquence, independence and personal reputation. He initially belonged to the early Caps Party and was one of its leaders in the Parliament of 1760–1762. However, he disliked the excesses of the Caps' rule, and during the last two parliaments of the Age of Liberty he joined the united Royal Court and Hats parties. In 1771 he was voted out of the clergy class by the Caps on the grounds that the Stockholm consistory had elected too many representatives. Even during the Gustavian era, Celsius was one of the most important men in the clergy class and was the leader of the moderate opposition within the clergy at the Riksdag of 1778–1779 and 1786.

== Family ==
Celsius was the son of Olof Celsius and a cousin of astronomer Anders Celsius. In 1744, he married Charlotta (Kajsa Lotta) Kyronia (Holmberg). After her death in 1745, he married Andreetta Katarina von Stiernman – daughter of historian Anders Anton von Stiernman – the following year.

His children were:

- Margareta Elisabeth (1745–1748)
- Catharina Charlotta (1747–1803), married vicar Jonas Breding
- Olof (1749–1750)
- Ingrid Fredrika (1751–1751)
- Elisabeth Ulrika (1751–1817), married vicar Lars Anton Borg
- Margareta Fredrika (1753–1828), married vicar Erik Benjamin Westman and later vicar Nils Insulin
- Inga Lovisa (1754–1811), married bishop Thure Weidman; children ennobled with the name Lagerheim in 1805
- Olof (1757–1838), served as lieutenant colonel
- Magnus Anton (1767–1833), served as chief magistrate

Celsius was buried in Lund Cathedral, but his remains were moved to Norra kyrkogården in Lund in 1875.

== See also ==
- Celsius family
