= Henschen =

Henschen is a surname. Notable people with the surname include:

- Godfrey Henschen (1601–1681), Belgian Jesuit hagiographer
- Helena Henschen (1940–2011), Swedish designer and writer
- Lars Vilhelm Henschen (1805–1885), Swedish jurist and politician
- Salomon Eberhard Henschen (1847–1930), Swedish doctor, professor and neurologist, son of Lars
- Veronique Henschen (born 1988), Luxembourgish dressage rider
