= Petrus Munck =

Swedish bishop (1732–1803)

- Bishop
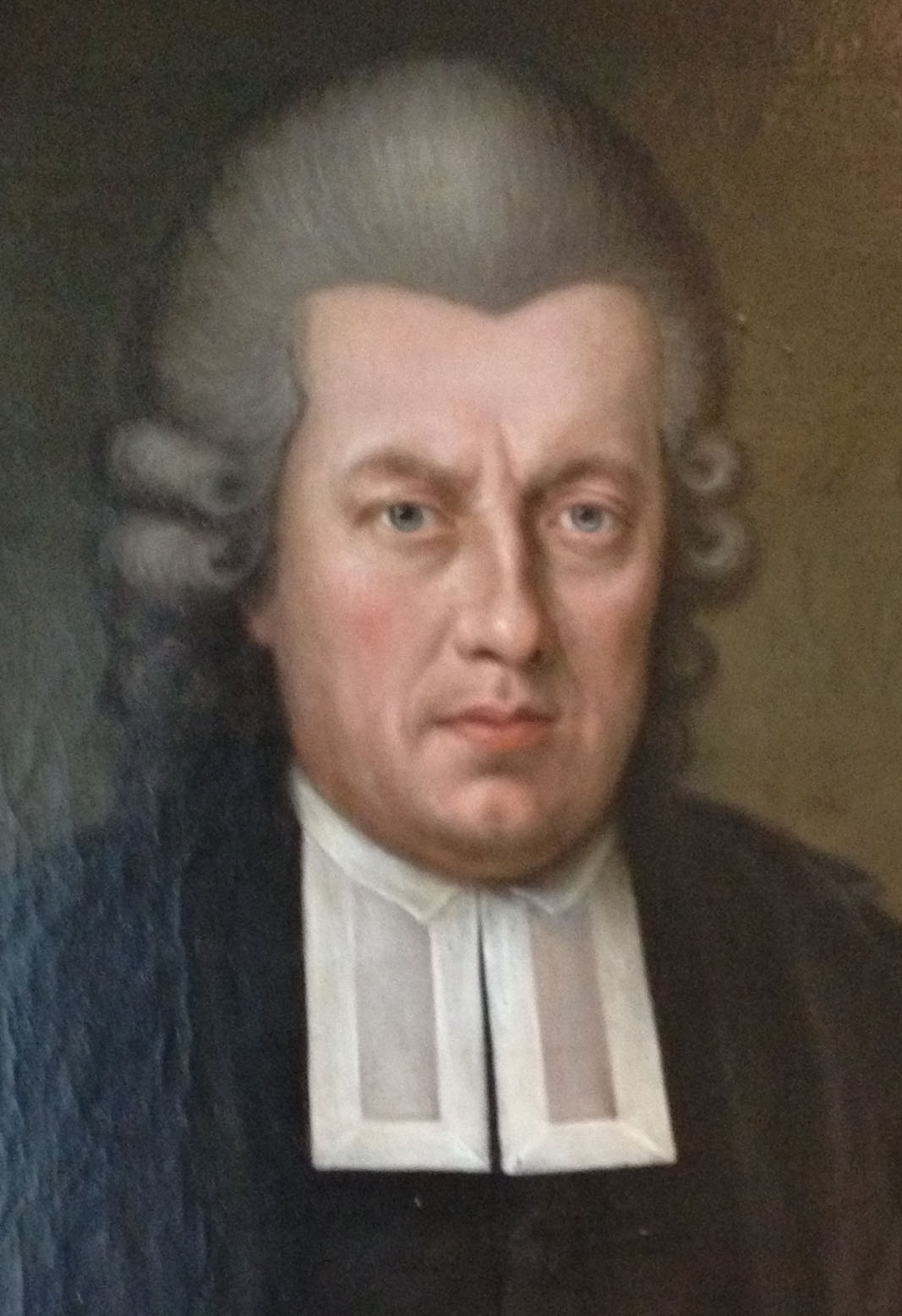
- Petrus Munck, portrait by Martin David Roth
- Church: Church of Sweden
- Diocese: Diocese of Lund
- In office: 1794–1803
- Predecessor: Olof Celsius the Younger
- Successor: Nils Hesslén

Orders
- Ordination: 1757

Personal details
- Born: 14 July 1732 Trolle Ljungeby, Scania, Sweden
- Died: 18 July 1803 (aged 71) Helsingborg, Sweden
- Children: Eleven, including Brita Catharina Lidbeck and Eberhard Zacharias Munck af Rosenschöld

Petrus Munck (14 July 1732 – 18 July 1803) was a Swedish professor and bishop of the Diocese of Lund from 1794 to 1803. He was the father of doctor Eberhard Zacharias Munck af Rosenschöld and singer Brita Catharina Lidbeck. Munck began his studies at Lund University at age thirteen and later became a professor of Greek and Oriental languages, and then of theology, at the university.

== Biography ==
Munck was born to Zacharias Munck and Catharina Sophia Winding in Trolle-Ljungby parish in Scania, where his father was vicar. He began his studies at Lund University in 1745, at thirteen years of age. He received his master's degree in philosophy in 1751 under the supervision of professor Sven Lagerbring. Munck received his doctorate in Greek and Oriental languages in 1753. He then stayed in Uppsala until 1756, where he made a name for himself with his treatise De jure devolutionis (1755), in which he argued that a ruler should settle theological disputes and – without violating freedom of conscience – determine the prevailing religion. The church could not have this right without endangering the peace of the state. Both the faculty of theology and the faculty of philosophy refused to grade the thesis. This was done by order of the chancellery.

Munck was offered a docentship in politics by Johan Ihre, but preferred to return to Lund, where he was ordained and became an adjunct professor of theology in 1757. Although he was passed over for the doctorate in theology in 1768, he succeeded, after complaining to the university's chancellor, in taking the dissertation examination and then receiving his doctorate. The dissertation, entitled De synergismo recentiori (1769), was a dispute and response to the later dean of Skara, Andreas Knös, who had attacked Munck because of his notes on conversion that he had added to Danish theologian Marcus Wøldike's Compendium theologiæ, published by him in 1760, a work that long remained the accepted textbook in theology throughout Scandinavia and was published in four large editions.

In 1769 Munck became professor of Greek and Oriental languages. In 1775 he became third professor, in 1776 second professor of theology, and in 1778 first professor of theology and dean. In 1794 he was appointed bishop of the Diocese of Lund and pro-chancellor of Lund University. He was a member of the clergy estate at the Riksdag of 1792 and 1800, during the first of which he gained the favor of Gustav III. In 1799 his children were ennobled with the name Munck af Rosenschöld.

Theologically, he held to orthodox Lutheran views and was a strong opponent of both Swedenborgianism and Moravianism. Munck also influenced Gustav IV Adolf's anti-Enlightenment views.

Munck died in 1803 at Ramlösa hälsobrunn, a mineral spa in Helsingborg, Sweden.

=== Family ===
In 1765 Munck married Anna Christina Bring (1747–1767), daughter of provost Jöns Ebbeson Bring and Christina Elisabet Lagerlöf. Two years after her death he married Ulrica Eleonora Rosenblad (1750–1793), daughter of professor Eberhard Rosenblad and Ulrika von Hermansson. He had eleven children, including singer Brita Catharina Lidbeck and doctor Eberhard Zacharias Munck af Rosenschöld. One daughter married doctor Carl Fredrik Liljewalch (doctor) and another married admiralty superintendent Anders Lars Fahnehjelm. His son Johan Munck af Rosenschöld was a chief magistrate, father of Peter Munck af Rosenschöld and grandfather of Salomon Eberhard Henschen.
