= Ebbe Bring =

Swedish priest and politician (1733–1804)

Ebbe Bring (30 December 1733 – 17 January 1804) was a Swedish priest and member of the Riksdag of the Estates.

== Biography ==
Ebbe Bring was the son of vicar of Brönnestad Olof Ebbesson Bring (1702–1747) and Elsa Catharina Collin. He was born in Brönnestad parish, Scania. He was the nephew of professor Sven Lagerbring and uncle of Gustaf Olof Lagerbring. After receiving his master's degree in 1757, he became docent of the philosophy faculty at Lund University and taught natural history. In 1766 he was called to service in his home parish of Brönnestad, where he became vicar in 1760 and provost of Västra Göinge hundred in 1788, before moving to Malmö in 1791 as vicar of St. Peter's parish, becoming provost of Oxie hundred. In 1801 he became a member of the Order of the Polar Star.

Bring was a member of the Riksdag of the Estates in 1792.

His wife Maria Chatarina Hallström was the daughter of his predecessor in Brönnestad. His son, Sven Håkan Bring, was a medical doctor and assessor and the father of priest Ebbe Gustaf Bring. Some of his other notable descendants are Samuel Ebbe Bring, Sven Libert Bring, and Johan Christofer Bring.

He died in Malmö in 1804.
