= Celsius family =

The Celsius family descended from the vicar of Ovanåker parish in Gävleborg County, Sweden, Nicolaus Magni Travillagæus, later Alptaneus (1577–1658). His son, the mathematician and astronomer Magnus Celsius, took the name Celsius which was the Latinized form (from celsus ‘mound’) of his father's vicarage, Högen, and his childhood home.

A branch of the family was ennobled on 9 November 1756, with the name von Celse, Olof Celsius the Elder's children. The von Celse branch of the family became extinct in 1838, with the death of Lieutenant-Colonel Olof von Celse.

== Notable Celsius family members ==
- Magnus Celsius (1621–1679)
  - Nils Celsius (1658–1724)
    - Anders Celsius (1701–1744)
  - Johan Celsius (1660–1710)
  - Olof Celsius (the Elder) (1670–1756),
    - Olof Celsius the Younger (1716–1794)
