= Uppsala högre elementarläroverk för flickor =

Swedish girls' school and women's college

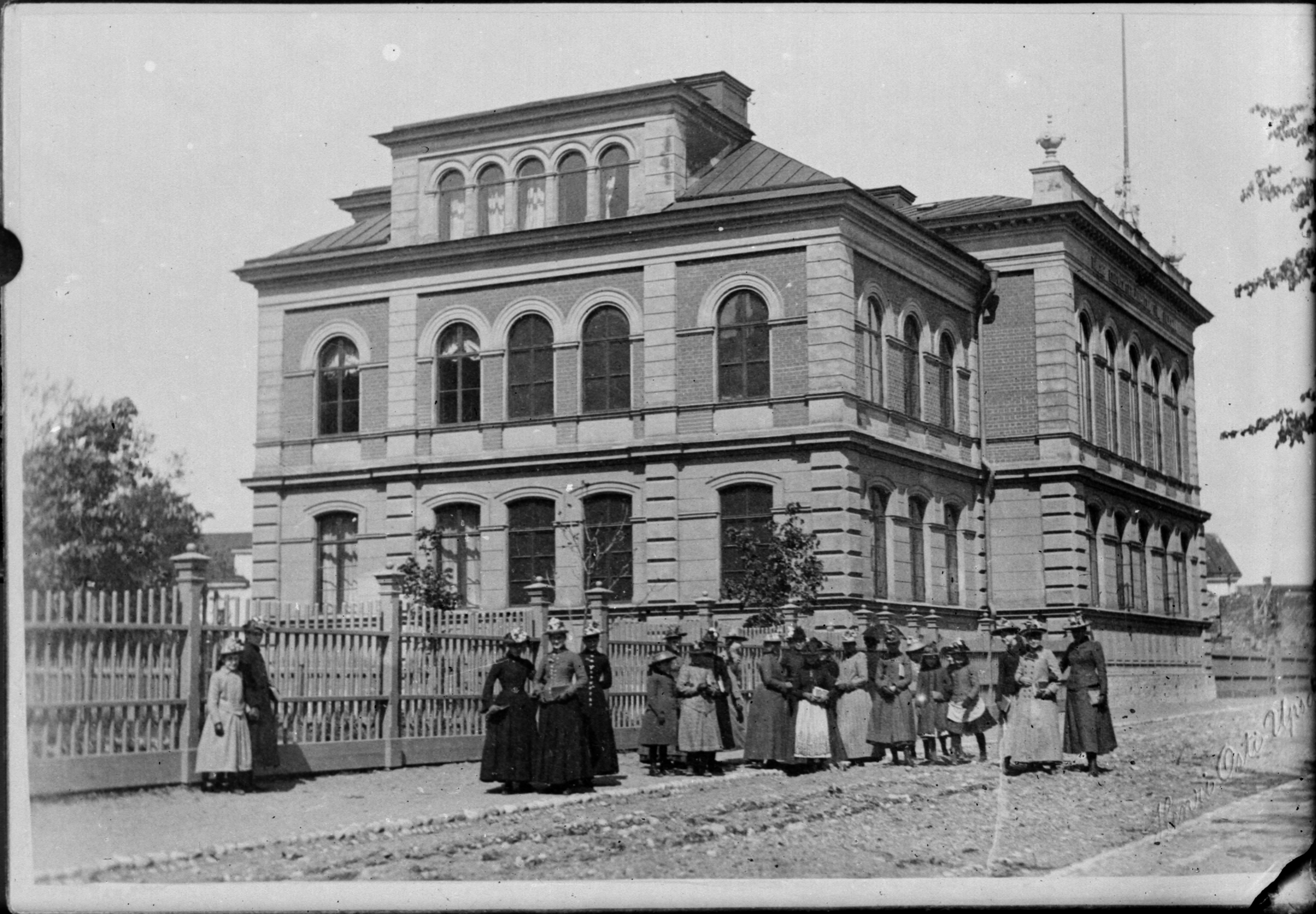
The School's building (photo taken between 1889 and 1914)

Uppsala högre elementarläroverk för flickor (Uppsala Higher Elementary College for Girls) or Högre Allmänna läroverket för flickor (Higher Public College for Girls) was a pioneering Swedish girls' school and later women's college. Commonly referred to as Magdeburg, the school was located in Uppsala, Sweden and was active from 1865 until 1968.

== History ==
The school was founded by Maria Henschen (1840–1927). She was the daughter of Judge Lars Wilhelm Henschen and his wife Augusta Munck af Rosenschöld and was the sister of Dr. Salomon Eberhard Henschen. Maria Henschen had been a student at Flickskolan på Rostad which was operated by the educational pioneer Cecilia Fryxell school in Rostad. Maria Henschen initially operated her school, which was called Henschenska flickskolan (Heschen Girls' School), on her farmer's estate. It was founded in 1865, two years after the closure of the Klosterskolan girls' school which had been operated by educational pioneer Jane Miller Thengberg.

As the first girls' school in Sweden with 8th level classes, it was a pioneer institution. Studies including chemistry, physics and natural science, were not at the time regarded to be suitable subjects for female students. Introduction of such subjects in a girls' school initially met with strong resistance from school inspectors. In 1870, the school was moved to new and larger premises and formally renamed Uppsala högre elementarläroverk för flickor or Högre Allmänna läroverket för flickor. Supporters of the new school included Claes Hultkrantz, Per Adolf Geijer and Hugo Hildebrandsson, while Carl David af Wirsén, Pontus Wikner, Henning von Scheele as well as her brother Salomon Eberhard Henschen were among its teachers. Maria Henschen financed the institution herself and remained its principal until her marriage in 1878. From 1873, when women in Sweden were allowed to attend university, it functioned as a college, and after 1874 it was given government financial support.

The school incorporated other schools for girls in Uppsala; in 1883, Krookska skolan (1863–1883) and in 1889 Nisbethska skolan (1849–1889). In 1902, it became a part of the Magdeburg Foundation (Stiftelsen Magdeburg), and was thereafter more commonly referred to as Magdeburg. As with other Swedish girls' schools, Uppsala högre elementarläroverk för flickor followed a typical pattern for its time. It was founded by a private person in the middle of the 19th century; after 1873 functioned as a college for women on their way to university; after 1874 received government support; became a government school from 1928 and finally closed in 1968.

== Other sources ==
- Torgny Nevéus: Flickornas borg: historia och hågkomster kring en Uppsalaskola.
- Bo S. Lindberg: Salomon Eberhard Henschen. En biografi
- Bergen, von, släkt, urn:sbl:18570, Svenskt biografiskt lexikon, hämtad 2014-04-30.
- Flickskola
- Nordisk Familjebok, andra upplagan med supplement
- Svensk Uppslagsbok, första upplagan (1935- )
- Bonniers Konversationlexikon andra upplagan (1950- )
- Nationalencyklopedien
- Uppsala Nya Tidning. Julnummer 1947.
