= Centigrade (disambiguation) =

Centigrade is a historical forerunner to the Celsius temperature scale, synonymous in modern usage.

Centigrade may also refer to:

- Centigrade, one hundredth of a gradian (a unit of plane angle)
- Centigrade (2007 film), a short thriller film
- Centigrade (2020 film), a survival thriller film
- 1001° Centigrades, an album by French Zeuhl band Magma in 1971
- Centigrade 232, an album and book by Robert Calvert, recorded in 1986, released in 2007

== See also ==
- Celsius (disambiguation)
