= Anders Anton von Stiernman =

Swedish historian

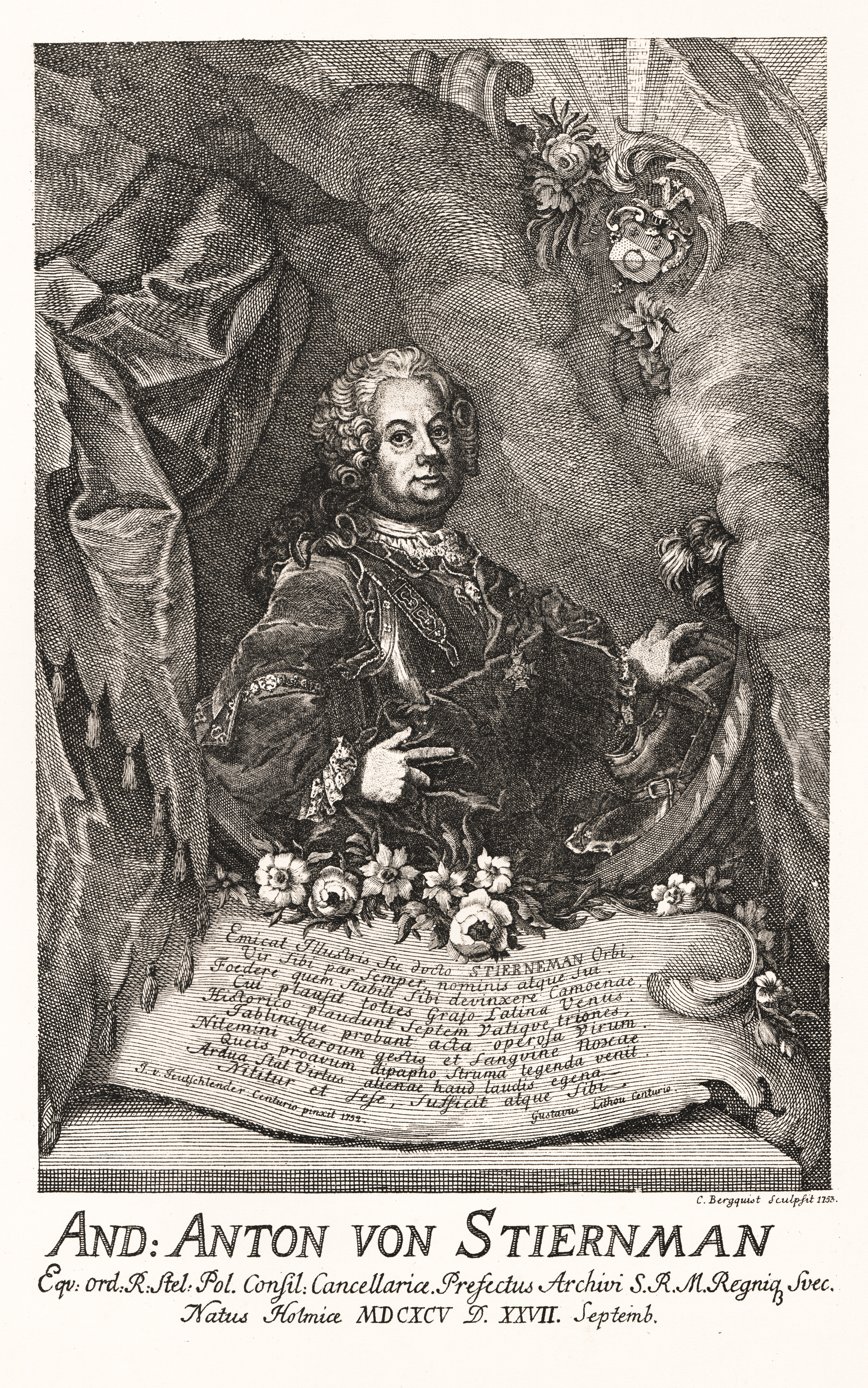
Anders Anton von Stiernman. Engraving (1753).

Anders Anton von Stiernman (27 September 1695 – 2 March 1765) was a Swedish historian and manuscript collector.

== Biography ==
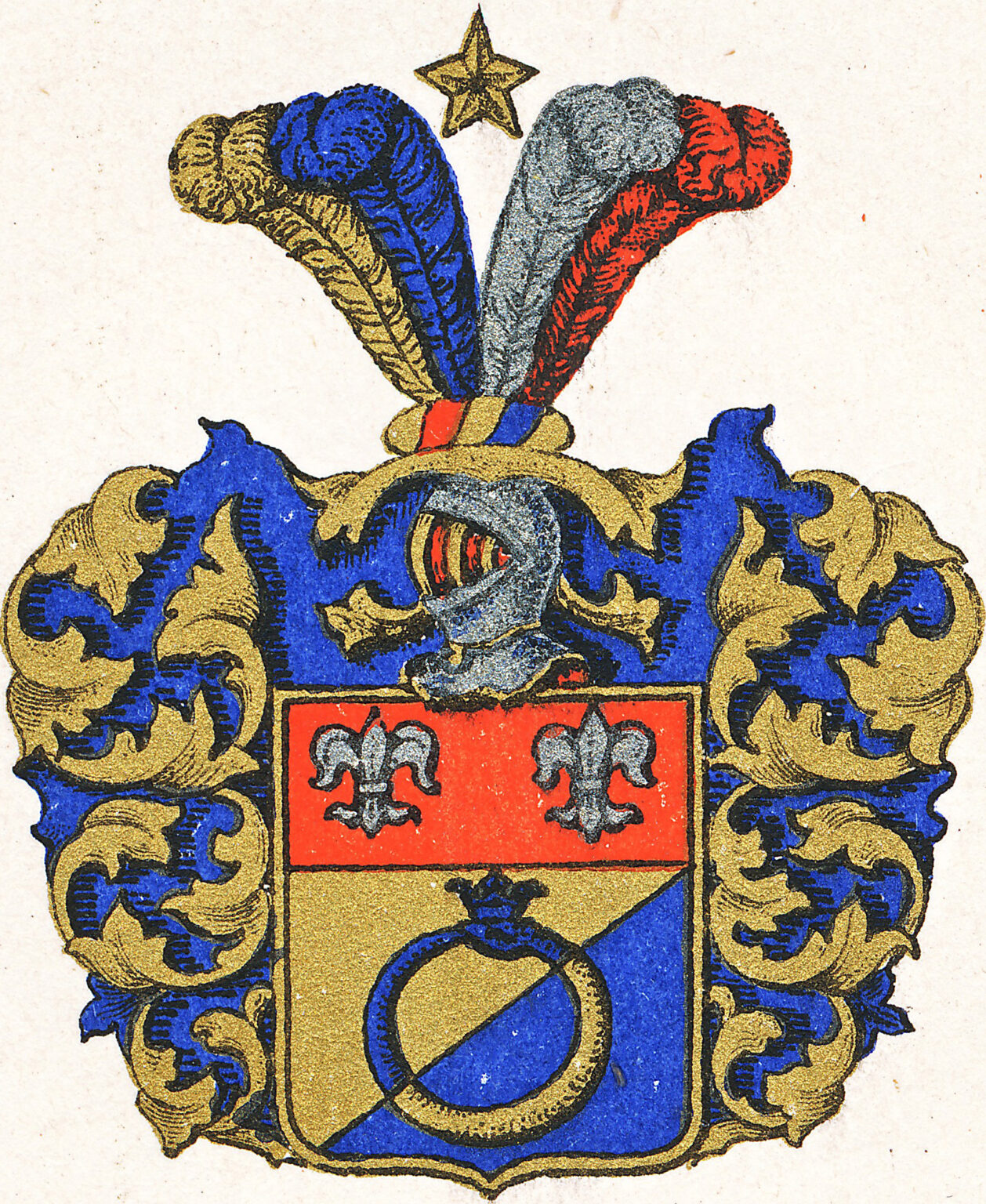
von Stiernman's coat of arms.

He was born on 27 September 1695 in Stockholm. He adopted the name Stiernman after his stepfather. In 1715 he became a student in Uppsala. He hesitated in choosing between the ministry and the military but finally came to devote himself to historical studies, which he developed an interest in, in the course of his employment as a tutor of Gustaf Rålamb, whose libraries and collections were at his disposal. In 1718 he was a clerk of the Antiquities Archives, but was later transferred to the Swedish National Archives.]

He made research trips in 1722 to Copenhagen and in 1724 the Baltic provinces. In 1732 he was promoted to actuary and 1740 to secretary to the director. In 1743 he was ennobled as "von Stiernman". In 1745 he was made a member of the Swedish Academy of Sciences and in 1747 became the secretary.

He died on 2 March 1765.

== Legacy ==
His manuscripts were acquired after his death by Uppsala University Library and through purchase and partly through the donation of his son-in-law, Olof Celsius the Younger (1716–1794), who married his only daughter.
