= Maria Henschen =

Swedish school director (1840–1927)

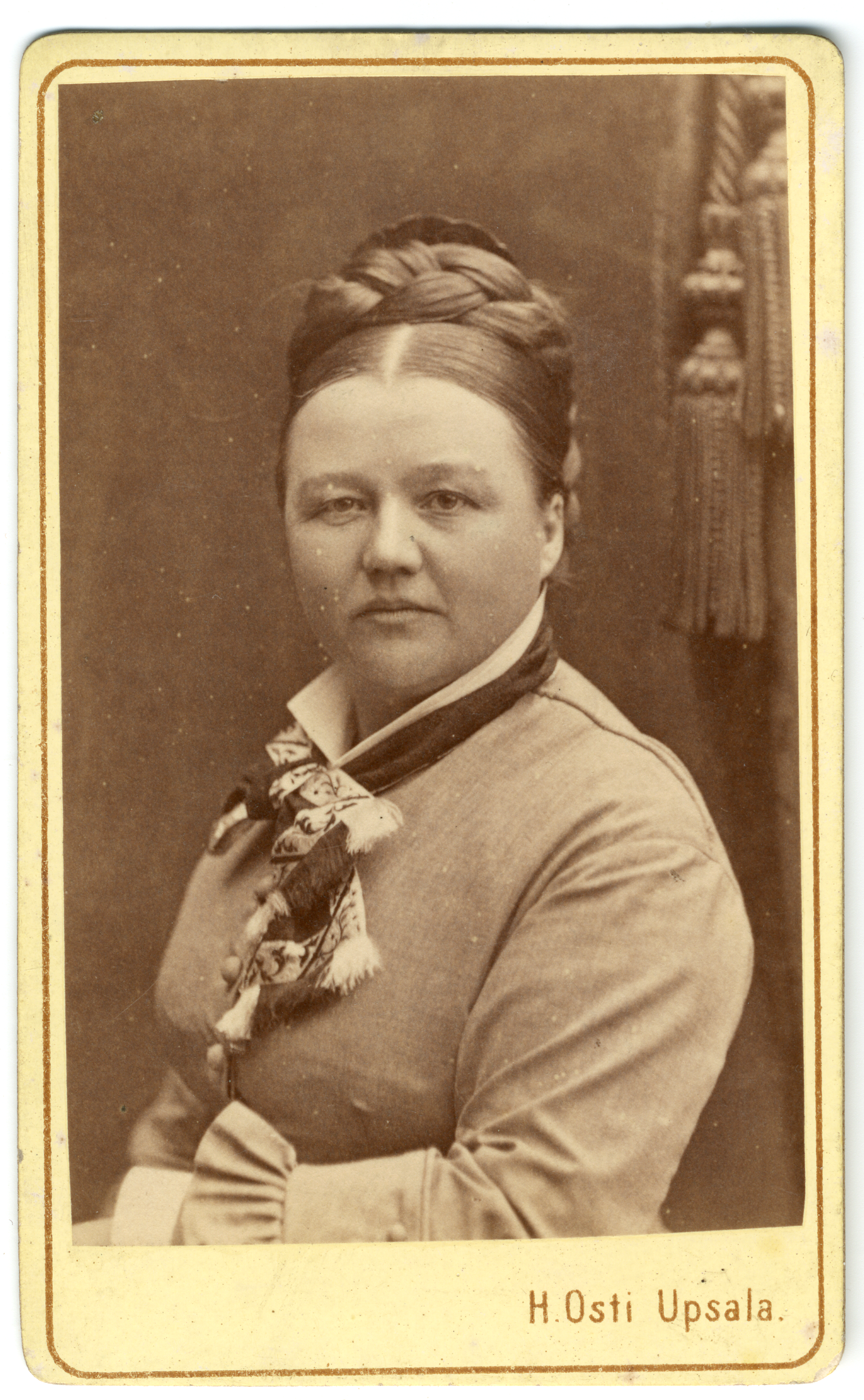
- Born: 26 March 1840; Uppsala, Sweden
- Died: 30 May 1927 (aged 87); Stockholm, Sweden
- Other name: Maria von Bergen
- Occupation: School director
- Known for: Establishing one of the first girls' schools in Sweden
- Father: Lars Vilhelm Henschen
- Relatives: 5 siblings, including: Salomon Eberhard Henschen; Wilhelm (William) Henschen

Maria Beata Catharina Henschen, also von Bergen (26 March 1840 – 30 May 1927) was a Swedish school director. She founded Uppsala högre elementarläroverk för flickor ('Uppsala Higher Elementary College for Girls') in 1865.

== Biography ==
Maria Henschen was born in Uppsala in 1840 and was the daughter of jurist Lars Vilhelm Henschen and Augusta Munck af Rosenschöld. Henschen had five siblings, Johan Henschen (1837), publicist Wilhelm (William) Henschen (1842–1925), Josef Henschen (1843), Esaias Henschen (1845), and doctor Salomon Eberhard Henschen (1847–1930).

She was educated at Cecilia Fryxell's school at Rostad, and then also taught there between 1861 and 1865, also taking several study trips abroad. She studied French, German and English, and for a time also worked as a governess.

In 1865 she founded a girls' school in Uppsala, called Henschenska flickskolan ('the Henschen Girls' School') after her. The school became a pioneering institution in Sweden. Her brother Salomon taught natural sciences early on and established a small museum. In 1870, the school was taken over by an association, relocated and renamed Högre Allmänna läroverket för flickor or Uppsala högre elementarläroverk för flickor. However, Henschen continued to finance the school and remained as its director until her marriage in 1878, when she was succeeded by Maria Alexandersson.

That year she married vicar Carl Camillus Oldenburg, which her family was against; the marriage was unhappy from the beginning and ended in divorce in 1881. In 1887 she married wholesaler Gustaf von Bergen (1842–1904) and started using the surname von Bergen; however, she is more commonly known by her maiden name. von Bergen was also the head of a company producing malt for medical purposes. In Salomon's letters, von Bergen is said to have beaten Henschen and spent all her money, leaving her penniless. Together with her brother in law Carl von Bergen, she was involved in spiritism and occultism, also helping found Sällskapet för psykisk forskning ('the Association for Psychic Research').

Henschen was an assistant to women's rights pioneer Sophie Adlersparre. She was one of the founders of the women's association Nya Idun in 1885. She also contributed to the Fredrika Bremer Association's feminist periodical Dagny and worked as its editorial secretary. Upon receiving a submission by the then-unknown writer Selma Lagerlöf, she noted, "Here there is not only talent, here there is genius". Henschen published Blänkfyrar: citat ur verldslitteraturen and the journal Eftervärlden.

Henschen often had a strained relationship with her family; she has been described as "very bizarre". She considered herself a financial expert; however, she was primarily supported by borrowing money from family, while at the same time being very critical of them and accusing them of stealing money. Her behavior while living in boarding houses, including talking aloud to spirits at night, shouting about devils, and getting in fights, led to her eviction. Several years before her death, Salomon wrote in frustration, "may she soon go away, for her wild performances everywhere make it impossible to provide her with a roof over her head." He had no contact with her for several years, while their brother Josef attempted to have her declared incompetent. Some family members took her behavior as a result of her interest in occultism. Towards the end of her life, she was supported financially through a pension from the school.

She died on 30 May 1927 in Stockholm. At that time, Salomon said, "her change of mind towards the end has softened the sad memory I have of her." Her funeral was attended by her friends Oskar Widman and Lydia and Sven Bring, as well as family. She is buried in Uppsala old cemetery.
