= Nils Hesslén =

Swedish bishop (1728–1811)

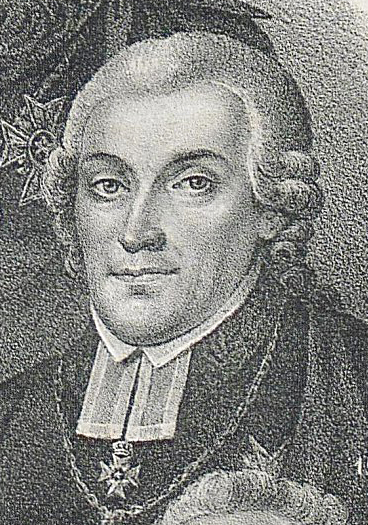
- Nils Hesslén. Detail from 1847 lithograph.
- Church: Church of Sweden
- Diocese: Diocese of Lund
- In office: 1803–1811
- Predecessor: Petrus Munck
- Successor: Wilhelm Faxe

Orders
- Ordination: 1767
- Consecration: 1805

Personal details
- Born: 2 September 1728; Visseltofta, Scania, Sweden
- Died: 13 April 1811 (aged 82)
- Spouse: Maria Beata von Engeström (m. 1779, died)

Nils Hesslén (2 September 1728 – 13 April 1811) was a Swedish bishop, university professor, and a founder of the Royal Physiographic Society in Lund. He served as the bishop of the Diocese of Lund from 1805 to 1811.

== Biography ==
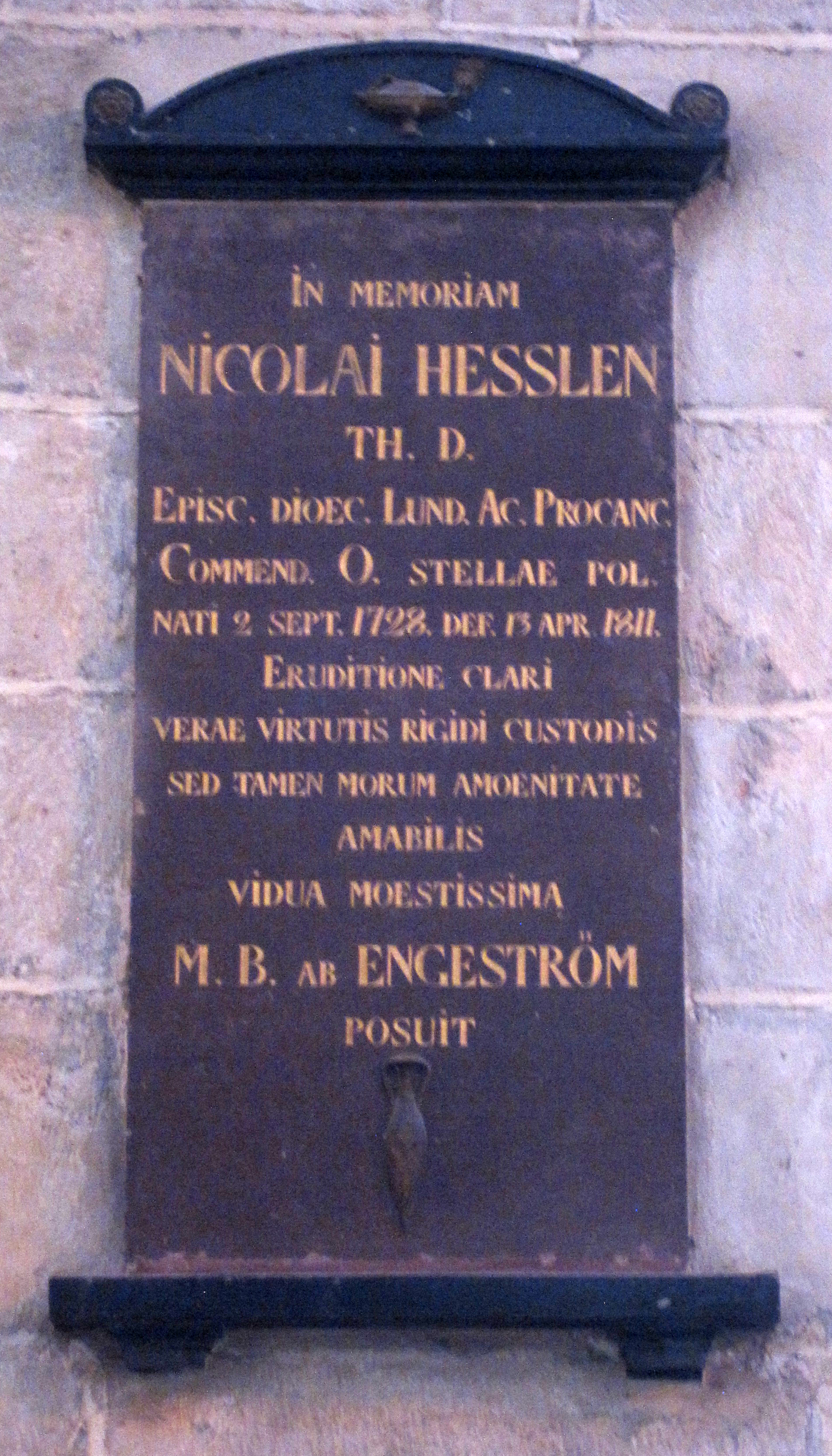
Hesslén's epitaph in Lund Cathedral.

Hesslén was born in Visseltofta, Scania, Sweden, to Måns Sunesson, a farmer and district judge (häradsdomare) and Sara Månsdotter. Hesslén's father hired a Norwegian student in the area to teach his son privately. His studies continued in Lund in 1745, where he received his magister degree in 1751. In 1755 he became docent in theology and in 1760 an adjunct professor. Hesslén was ordained in 1767. Awarded a doctorate in theology in 1769, he returned to Lund University in 1775 as the fourth professor of theology. He became first professor of theology and dean of Lund in 1794.

He was one of the founders of the Royal Physiographic Society in Lund in 1772 and served as its president in 1783–1784.

In 1777 and 1794 Hesslén was on the lists of nominees for the office of Bishop of Lund without success. After the death of Bishop Petrus Munck in July 1803, he received the majority of the votes in the election and was appointed – because of the absence of King Gustav IV Adolf due to the war – to the episcopate only in March 1805. He was installed by Archbishop Jacob Axelsson Lindblom in the summer of 1805 and served as bishop of the Diocese of Lund until his death, without making any particular impact there. His special commitment continued to be to the university, of which he was pro-chancellor.

He was made a Knight of the Order of the Polar Star in 1807 and Commander in 1809.

Hesslén did not publish any writings. He became renowned for his good financial standing and amassed a considerable fortune; he was also known for his satirical attacks on those who opposed him. He was described by poet Esaias Tegnér as a "Christianized Socrates".

He married Maria Beata von Engeström in 1779, whose father Johan Engeström had held the same office as bishop from 1748 to 1777.
