= Thure Weidman =

Swedish professor and bishop (1744–1828)

- Church: Church of Sweden
- Diocese: Diocese of Skara
- In office: 1789–1828

Personal details
- Born: 15 December 1744; Gladsax Parish, Scania, Sweden
- Died: 15 August 1828 (aged 83); Skara, Sweden

Thure Weidman (15 December 1744 – 15 August 1828) was a Swedish academic and clergyman who was a professor at Lund University and bishop of the Diocese of Skara.

== Biography ==
Weidman was born in Gladsax Parish, Scania. He began his studies in Lund in 1756, received his master's degree in philosophy with high honors in 1766, was hired the same year as a library instructor and was appointed as docent in 1767 in literary history and later in ethics. He became an adjunct in 1771 in Oriental languages and Greek at Lund University and was promoted to the role of professor in the same subjects in 1776. Three years later he was transferred to a professorship in the theological faculty and held the chair until being appointed to bishop of the Diocese of Skara in May 1789. He served as bishop until 1828. His writings are confined almost exclusively to dissertations on theological and philological content. Weidman was inspektor of Blekingska Nation at Lund University from 1787 to 1789, succeeding Sven Lagerbring.

He died in Skara in 1828.

== Family ==
Weidman married Inga Lovisa von Celse (1755–1811), daughter of his friend and fellow bishop Olof Celsius the Younger. Their children were ennobled with the name Lagerheim in 1805. Weidman's siblings included priest Pehr Gottfrid Weidman, mayor Lars Johan Weidman, and Olaf Elias Weidman, who was later knighted and took the surname Lagerheim.
