= Brita Catharina Lidbeck =

Swedish singer (1788–1864)

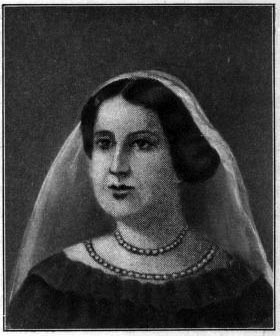
Brita Catharina Lidbeck

Brita Catharina Lidbeck, also Brita Catharina Munck af Rosenschöld (1788 – 2 March 1864) was a Swedish Dilettante concert singer. She was a member of the Royal Swedish Academy of Music.

She was the daughter of Petrus Munck af Rosenschöld, bishop of Lund, and sister of physician Eberhard Zacharias Munck af Rosenschöld. She married Anders Lidbeck, professor in Lund, in 1817. She was a student of the opera singer Karl Magnus Craelius, and made her public debut at a concert arranged by him in Stockholm in 1813. Lidbeck was a non-professional concert singer. She performed at charity concerts and in musical societies. She was inducted into the Royal Swedish Academy of Music in 1827. She performed in public for the last time in a charity concert to the benefit of the students of the Royal Academy of Music on 6 March 1842. Singers from the royal academy performed at her funeral.

== See also ==
- Anna Brita Wendelius
- Christina Fredenheim

== Sources ==
- Arvid, Ahnfelt (1887). "Lidbeck, Brita Catharina". Europas konstnärer (in Swedish).
- Crustenstolpe, Magnus (1865). "Brita Catharina Lidbeck [nekrolog]". Svea Folk-kalender (in Swedish). pp. 130–132.
- Hilleström, Gustaf. Kungl. Musikaliska Akademien, Matrikel 1771–1971 (in Swedish).
- Stålberg, Wilhelmina (1864). "Lidbeck, Brita Catharina". Anteckningar om svenska qvinnor (in Swedish).
