= Samuel Ebbe Bring =

Swedish librarian and historian (1879–1965)

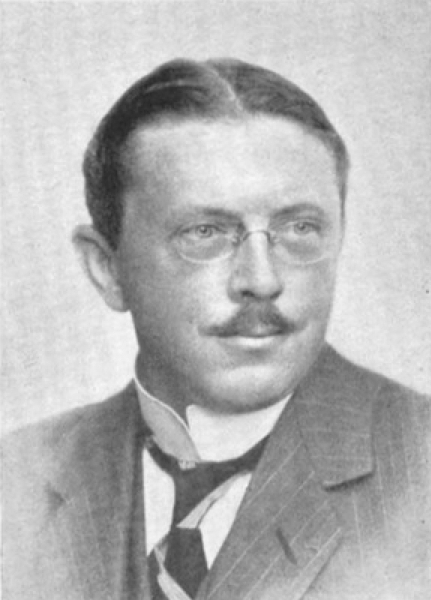

Samuel Ebbe Bring (25 September 1879 – 16 January 1965) was a Swedish librarian and historian.

== Biography ==
Bring was born in Vinslöv Parish, Kristianstad County, to Ebbe Lars Bring and Klara Dorotea Bergman. From 1908 to 1909 he taught at the Palmgrenska samskolan. He became second librarian at the Royal Library of Sweden in 1909 and a doctor of philosophy at Lund University in 1912. From 1914 to 1944 he held the role of first librarian at Uppsala University Library. Among Bring's extensive writings are the history of the Trollhätte Canal (two volumes, 1911–1914), the Uppsala County Royal Agricultural Society (two volumes, 1915–1916), the history of the Göta Canal (1922), the history of the Södertälje Canal up to 1819 (1925), the Uppsala County Fire Company 1845–1925 (1925), and several contributions to research on Charles XII in the Karolinska förbundet's yearbook. Bring also edited and published Karl XII. Till 200-årsdagen av hans död (1918), memoirs of Magnus Stenbock (1910), Christopher Polhem (1911), Carl von Roland's Minnen från fångenskapen i Ryssland (1914), Seigneur A. de la Mottrayes resor 1711–1725 (1918) and other works.

Bring was also the editor of the Swedish edition of Svend Dahl's Haandbog i Bibliotekskundskap (1924 ff.) and, together with historian Sven Tunberg, of Norstedt's Världshistoria (1926 ff). Bring's greatest bibliographical contribution was the work Itineraria Svecana. Bibliografisk förteckning över resor i Sverige fram till 1950 (1954).

In 1910 he married Märta Leijonmarck, daughter of Johan Ludvig Leijonmarck and Henriette Nauckhoff, and the couple had two children, Eva and Ulla.

He died in Uppsala in 1965 and is buried at Vinslöv Cemetery.
