= Salomon Eberhard Henschen =

Swedish doctor and professor (1847–1930)

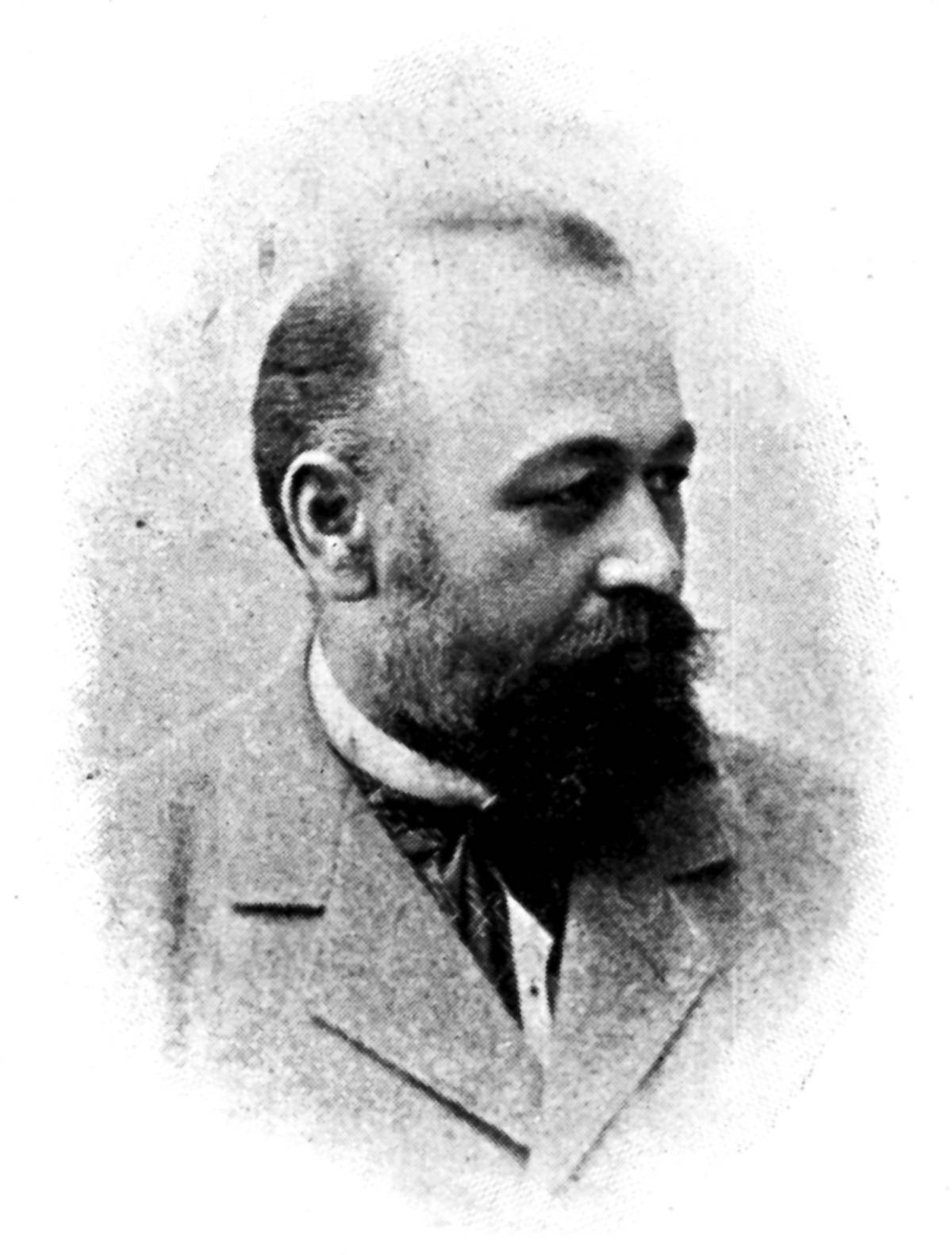
- Salomon Eberhard Henschen (ca. 1901)
- Born: 28 February 1847; Uppsala, Sweden
- Died: 16 December 1930 (aged 83); Stockholm, Sweden
- Occupations: Neurologist, professor
- Father: Lars Vilhelm Henschen

Salomon Eberhard Henschen (28 February 1847 – 16 December 1930) was a Swedish doctor, professor and neurologist.

== Biography ==
=== Background and education ===
Henschen was born in Uppsala, Sweden. He was the son of Lars Wilhelm Henschen (1805–1885) and wife Augusta Munck af Rosenschöld (1806–1856). He had five siblings, including Maria Henschen (1840–1927), the founder of the Uppsala högre elementarläroverk för flickor and publicist Wilhelm (William) Henschen (1842–1925).

Beginning in 1862, he studied medicine at the University of Uppsala. Henschen taught to earn money during his studies: he taught natural sciences at his sister's school from 1864 to 1866 and at missionary Peter Fjellstedt's Fjellstedt School from 1870 to 1873. Henschen went to Brazil, staying with Swedish physician and botanist Anders Fredrik Regnell; he conducted botanical research in Caldas from 1867 to 1869. He later published Études sur le genre Peperomia comprenant les espèces des Caldas (in Nova Acta Regiae Societatis Scientiarum Upsaliensis, ser. III-VII). After his return to Sweden, he resumed his medical studies at Uppsala. Henschen studied pathology under Axel Key. He received his bachelor's degree in medicine in 1873 and the following year relocated to Stockholm University. He was awarded his medical license in 1877.

=== Career and writings ===
From 1878, he worked in the institute of pathology at the University of Uppsala, while in the meantime, he practiced medicine at a summer resort at Ronneby in Blekinge. Henschen then continued his education in Leipzig under Carl Ludwig, receiving his doctorate in medicine in 1879 and publishing his dissertation Om indigosvafvelsyradt natrons avsöndring i njurarna (On the renal excretion of indigo sulfuric acid in the kidneys), for which he was awarded a prize by the Swedish Medical Society. In 1882 he was named professor and director at the clinic of internal medicine at Uppsala. In the late 1800s, Henschen was the first to describe athletic heart syndrome. From 1900 to 1912, he worked at the Karolinska Institutet in Stockholm.

Henschen is known for his investigations of aphasia, as well as his systematic studies involving the visual components/pathways of the brain. He "made major contributions in terms of clarifying the sense of sight localization in the brain's occipital lobe." His Klinische und anatomische Beiträge zur Pathologie des Gehirns (Clinical and anatomical contributions to the pathology of the brain) was published in over 25 editions from 1890 to 1930. It earned him the Letterstedt Prize from the Royal Swedish Academy of Sciences and two prizes from the Swedish Medical Society. In Penzoldt's and Stintzing's Handbuch der therapie, Henschen wrote the section Behandlung der Erkrankungen des Gehirns (1896, third edition 1903). His extensive output also includes Über die Hörsphäre (1916), awarded the Florman Prize and the Retzius Gold Medal, Zur Kenntniss der Migräne (1913), Erfahrungen über Diagnostik und Klinik der Herzklopfenfehler (1916), awarded the Medical Society's Alvarenga Prize, I alkoholfrågan (1913), Om hjernans byggnad ock verksamhet (1921). Together with Birger Nerman he published Ture Hederström's "Fornsagor och Eddakväden" (1917–1918).

In addition, he published a number of small papers on various areas of internal medicine, both in the proceedings of the Uppsala Medical Association and in foreign journals. Also notable is his book Om äktenskaps ingående från hälsans synpunkt (1904, German translation 1907). He also edited the collection La lutte contre la tuberculose en Suède (1905), in which he himself wrote two papers.

In 1919 he described dyscalculia, and later introduced the term acalculia to define the impairment of mathematical abilities in individuals with brain damage (1925).

In 1923–1924, he was one of a small group of neurologists who attended to Lenin, following the Soviet leader's third and final stroke. With his son, Folke Henschen (1881–1977), he collaborated on an autopsy of Lenin's brain.

== Personal life ==
In 1892, Henschen became a member of the Royal Society of Sciences in Uppsala, and in 1897 of the Swedish Academy of Sciences. He became a member of the Royal Society of Arts and Sciences in Gothenburg in 1906. He received an Honorary Doctorate at Uppsala University during 1900, at the University of Halle 1920 and at the University of Padua in 1922.

In 1879, he married Gerda Helena Maria Sandell (1852–1907), and later remarried in 1910, to Maria Augusta Pikulell (1877–1865). His children were physician Folke Henschen, Astri Douglas (wife of Archibald Douglas), translator Dagny Henschen and historian Ingegerd Henschen-Ingvar.

Physician and smallpox vaccine pioneer Eberhard Zacharias Munck af Rosenschöld was Henschen's great-uncle.

He was the grandfather of artist Helga Henschen, hymnwriter Britt G. Hallqvist, and doctor David H. Ingvar, and was the great-great-grandfather of Sophie, Hereditary Princess of Liechtenstein.

He died in Stockholm in 1930 and was buried in the Uppsala old cemetery.
