= Ovanåker =

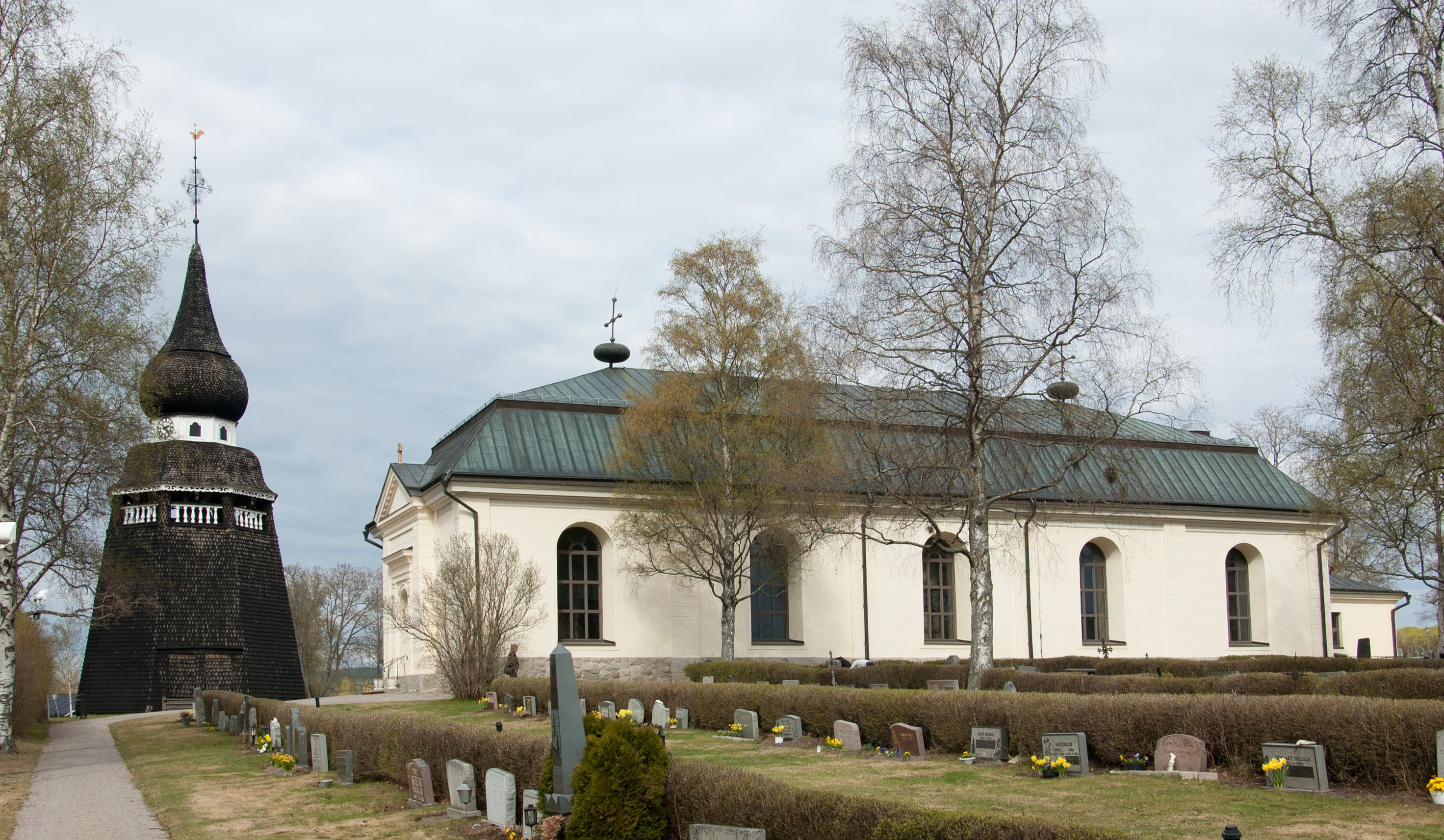
- Ovanåker Church

- Location within Sweden Gävleborg Location within Sweden
- Coordinates: 61°22′N 15°54′E
- Country: Sweden
- Province: Hälsingland
- County: Gävleborg County
- Municipality: Ovanåker Municipality

Area
  - Total: 0.70 km^{2} (0.27 sq mi)

Population (31 December 2010)
  - Total: 212
  - Density: 303/km^{2} (780/sq mi)
- Time zone: UTC+1 (CET)
  - Summer (DST): UTC+2 (CEST)

Ovanåker is a locality situated in Ovanåker Municipality, Gävleborg County, Sweden with 212 inhabitants in 2010. It is the original vicariate of the Celsius family, who take the name after the Latinized form of the locality.
