= Claudio Celso =

Brazilian guitarist, composer and arranger

- Born: August 4, 1955 (age 71); São Paulo, Brazil
- Genres: Brazilian jazz; jazz fusion
- Occupations: Guitarist; composer; arranger
- Instruments: Electric guitar; acoustic guitar
- Years active: 1972–present
- Labels: Universal Music; RCA; Maritaca
- Website: claudiocelso.com

Claudio Celso (born August 4, 1955) is a Brazilian guitarist, composer and arranger. His work includes jazz, bossa nova and Brazilian popular music. He was listed in the world's top 100 guitarists by Guitar Player Magazine in Brazil.

== Early years ==
Claudio Celso was born in São Paulo, Brazil. He began playing guitar at the age of four. He initially studied classical guitar and then learned bossa nova and jazz with guitarist/composer Paulinho Nogueira and also with his father, Nilson M. Celso, who was an early electric guitarist in Brazil.

== Performer ==
Celso is known for impeccable technique and deep jazz roots and for his breadth of experience. His career has included working with the Brazilian instrumental ensemble Zimbo Trio for over two years. He accompanied major popular artists with the Tupi Television Orchestra while in his hometown, São Paulo. From 1978 until 1985 he was based in New York City and worked with numerous well-known jazz icons and producers Teo Macero, Creed Taylor, Roy Cicala, and Eumir Deodato. He studied composition and arranging with Don Sebesky while in New York. He has subsequently worked internationally with numerous renowned musicians and has been playing in music clubs, concert venues and jazz festivals.

In early 2015, Claudio performed his Suite “Axis Mundi” at the Coliseu Theater in Santos, Brazil - with the Symphonic Orchestra of Santos – a concert designed for electric guitar and orchestra. This project unites both classical and contemporary music in an effort to revitalize passion and interest for symphonic instruments in young audiences all around the world. The event celebrated the city´s 469th birthday and had a sold out audience.

Back in Los Angeles late 2015, Claudio started the pre-production of his EP "Alpha Solaris", consisting of a series of compositions to musically tell the fantasy story of an astronaut on a lonely journey in search of a new planet for mankind. It was later recorded in 2018 at CDAudio Studios, Sao Paulo, where Claudio Celso had the privilege of having the late legendary bassist Arthur Maia participate in the recording.

During 2019 and 2020, Claudio releases the albums "Alpha Solaris", "Axis Mundi", "Simetria", "A Brazilian Cool Jazz Experience" (a remake of his previous "Swell" album) and three acoustic guitar albums: "Agreste, "Quilombo" and "Arraial" (Boom Boom Records) based on the sound of pure folkloric Brazilian grass roots music.

Back in Brazil in 2021, Claudio writes a set of 22 new original musical pieces. He calls It - the result of a lifetime in music, ranging from all influences including up tempo sambas dressed in elaborated chord changes (modulations), baião and modern jazz influences. This new repertoire is performed in a trio format composed of acoustic guitar, electric/upright bass and drums/percussion.

== Other ==
In addition to his career as a performer, Claudio does guitar clinics and writes articles for Guitar Player Magazine. He has taught extensively in his own country and internationally, published a Jazz Guitar instructional video, and mentored Brazilian guitar stars.

He frequently gives newspaper, magazine, radio and TV interviews, including an acclaimed interview with Guitarra Cover Magazine. His 2007 appearance on Programa do Jô, the popular TV talk show in Brazil, was followed by 4.6 million viewers.

In 2014, under the Rouanet Law, which allows tax payers (both persons and corporations) to make donations or sponsorships to cultural projects and get tax exemption, he received a grant from the Brazilian Ministry of Culture for a project which includes concerts and workshops throughout Brazil, and the recording of two new CDs.

== Discography ==
His recordings include:

- (2020) Axis Mundis - Suite for Guitar and Orchestra (Claudio Celso) – Boom Boom Records - Album
- (2019) Alpha Solaris (Claudio Celso) – Boom Boom Records - EP
- (2019) Arraial (Claudio Celso) – Boom Boom Records - Single
- (2019) Simetria (Claudio Celso) – Boom Boom Records - Single
- (2019) Quilombo (Claudio Celso) – Boom Boom Records - EP
- (2019) Agreste (Claudio Celso) – Boom Boom Records - Single
- (2019) A Brazilian Cool Jazz Experience (Claudio Celso) – Boom Boom Records - EP
- (2013) Turno di Notte (Francesco Lattanzi) DC Records/Italy – CD
- (2010) The Music of Claudio Celso (Claudio Celso) - Reverbnation - CD
- (2010) Surf Life (Claudio Celso) – CDBaby - CD
- (2009) Sambatuque (Salaberry) - Tum Tum Home Music - CD
- (2006) Swell – A Brazilian Cool Jazz Experience (Claudio Celso) - Maritaca – CD
- (2005) Vida de Artista (Paulo Freire) - Vai Ouvindo - CD
- (1998) Amazon Moon - The Music of Mike Stoller (Guilherme Vergueiro) - CD
- (1998) Padre Pio (Giacomo Piraino) – Boca Raton/Florida – CD
- (1998) Brazilian Jazz by Claudio Celso (Claudio Celso) - Universal Music - CD
- (1992) Raul Seixas – O Início, o Fim e o Meio (various artists) – Epic/Sony Music - CD
- (1991) O Inferno é Fogo (Lobão) – BMG - LP
- (1991) Lucky! (Sandra de Sá) - BMG Ariola – LP
- (1990) Pepê (various artists) – Fonobrás – LP
- (1990) A Girl from Ipanema (Ana France) - Yamaha Jazz - LP
- (1989) Mais (Marisa Monte) – video
- (1989) Pé de Boi: Power Samba Band (Guilherme Franco) - Arcadia - LP
- (1986) Vania Bastos (Vania Bastos) - Bom Tempo/Copacabana – LP
- (1986) Intelligence (Intelligence) – RCA – LP
- (1984) Red on Red (Claudio Roditi) - Greene St Records – LP
- (1982) The Brazilian Beat of Guanabara - Baystate Records - LP
- (1981) Jewel Eyes (Frank Ferrucci) – Wren Records - LP
- (1980) Elegia (Lloyd McNeill) - Baobab Records Co. - LP

== Compositions ==
Compositions include:

LP The Brazilian Beat of Guanabara

- "Vento"

LP Intelligence

- "Explode Alegria" (w/Simbas)
- "Homem do Fogo" (w/ Pedro & Albino Infantozzi, Simbas and Glauco Guerin)
- "Manhê” (w/ Simbas, Pedro Infantozzi and Albino Infantozzi)
- "Quero Ficar na Cidade” (w/ Kim Milford)
- "Rádio” (w/ David Musser)
- "Saudade de Você" (w/Simbas)
- "Sonho Louco” (w/ Pedro Infantozzi and Simbas)
- "Você Está Sempre em Mim” (w/ Kim Milford and Simbas)

CD Brazilian Jazz

- "Song for Anita"
- "Ascension"
- "Jungle Beat"
- "Children"
- "SUS"
- "Raga"

CD Swell - A Brazilian Cool Jazz Experience

- "Delfina"
- "Hades"
- "Liana's Waltz”
- "Presente para Deisy"
- "Song for Anita"
- "Swell"
- "Tomatoes"
- "Tudo Azul em Monicaland"

CD Surf Life

- "Ascension"
- "Back in the Water"
- "Balloneh"
- "Beach Break"
- "High Tide"
- "Hope"
- "Koalytha's Dream"
- "Panda the Fairy"
- "What a Day"

EP Alpha Solaris

- "Lifting Off"
- "Ascending"
- "Lending on Alpha Solaris"
- "Jupiter 1"

Single Agreste

- "Cangaceiro"
- "Menina Bonita"

Single Simetria

- "Simetria Parte A"
- "Simetria Parte B"

Single Arraial

- "Arraial Pt. A"
- "Arraial Pt. B"

EP Quilombo

- "Quilombo"
- "Xaxonico"
- "Caminho no Mato"
- "Meu Lugar"

EP A Brazilian Cool Jazz Experience

- "Hades"
- "Swell"
- "Presente para Deisy"
- "Delfina"

Album Axis Mundis - Suite for Guitar and Orchestra

- "Hades"
- "Sininha"
- "Beach Break"
- "Jungle Beat"
- "Leil dos Homens"
- "A Medley of Baloneh, Back in the Water & Hope"
