= Celso Murilo =

Brazilian musician

Celso Murilo, born Celso Pereira Levenhagen (9 March 1940, Baependi), is a Brazilian musician, composer and arranger.

== Biography ==
Celso Murilo was born 9 March 1940 in Baependi. He taught himself to play guitar and piano. He moved to Rio de Janeiro in 1959 and was employed by nightclub Arpege, where he worked with João Gilberto, Tom Jobim and others.

== Discography ==
- 1959: Mr. Ritmo
- 1961: Ritmos Na Passarela
- 1964: Tremendo Balanço (as "Celso Murilo e seu conjunto")
