= El Celso =

American artist

- Notable work: Art Burn post No Bills
- Style: Street art Installation art Performance art
- Movement: Post-graffiti

El Celso is a post-graffiti artist working on and off the streets of the United States. He was born in Newark, New Jersey and is currently active in the New York and Los Angeles areas.

== Career ==
He has been described in a recent issue of ARTnews as a “conceptualist” regarding his show at The Winkleman Gallery. described his show, “Art Burn,” an International contemporary art expo & immolation, as a “bonfire of the art vanities” and the Miami Herald declared it “a funky Basel sideshow.” The New York Times described his previous exhibition, “Post No Bills,” a street art gallery installation in Long Island City as “audacious.” The Brooklyn Rail describes El Celso as “a street artist with a taste for experimentation, a knack for making things happen and a predilection for drawing colorful naked women.” His figurative drawings, paintings and original works on Plexiglas were also the subject of a documentary series, “The Streets of New York,” which was broadcast on NHK in Japan in 2008. His work is also featured in numerous publications, street art books and web sites.

== Press articles and bibliography ==
- Hoop Scoop, ARTnews (NY: February 2011)
- The Art of Destruction, ARTnews (NY: May 2010)
- Bonfire of the Art Vanities, The Art Newspaper (LONDON: 12/04/09)
- Precious Works Go Up in Flames for Art’s Sake, Miami Herald (FL: 12/03/09)
- Peep-o-rama, Time Out NY, (NY: 09/08/09); Construction Zone: Beware of Audacious Art, The New York Times (NY: 07/02/08)
- The Very Public Life of Street Art, The Brooklyn Rail (NY: May 2008)
- Street Art in Alphabet City, Village Voice (NY: April 2008 –online)
- The Vandalism Vandal, New York Magazine (NY: 06/04/07)
- Don’t Hate, Collaborate!, Peel Magazine (NY: 06/1/07)
- The Street Art Show, Juxtapoz.com (NY: 06/05/07)
- The Alien Invader, Village Voice (NY: 03/13/07)
- Last Hurrah for Street Art, as Canvas Goes Condo, The New York Times (NY: 12/14/06)
- Small, but fierce, art, Metro (NY: 11/10/04)
- Lies, New York Press (NY: 10/27/04)
- Mano a Mano, Hoy (NY: 4/2/04)
- Soho’s Bold & Beautiful, Daily News (NY: 4/1/04)
- Adbusters Quarterly: Summer 1995, Vol. 3, No. 4.
- Stickers: From Punk Rock to Contemporary Art, DB Burkeman/Monica LoCascio (2010)
- Untitled. I &II. Street Art Counter Culture, Gary Shove (2009)
- Going Postal, Martha Cooper (2009)
- Street Art Cookbook, Benke Carlsson/Hop Louie (2009)
- This Means Nothing, Le Bijoutier (2008)
- Brooklyn Street Art, Jaime Rojo/Steven P. Harrington (2007)
- NYC BCN Street Art Revolution, Louis Bou (2006)
