= Lo Celso =

Lo Celso is a surname. Notable people with the surname include:

- Giovani Lo Celso (born 1996), Argentine footballer
- Francesco Lo Celso (born 2000), Argentine footballer
