= Anders Celsius =

Swedish astronomer and physicist (1701–1744)

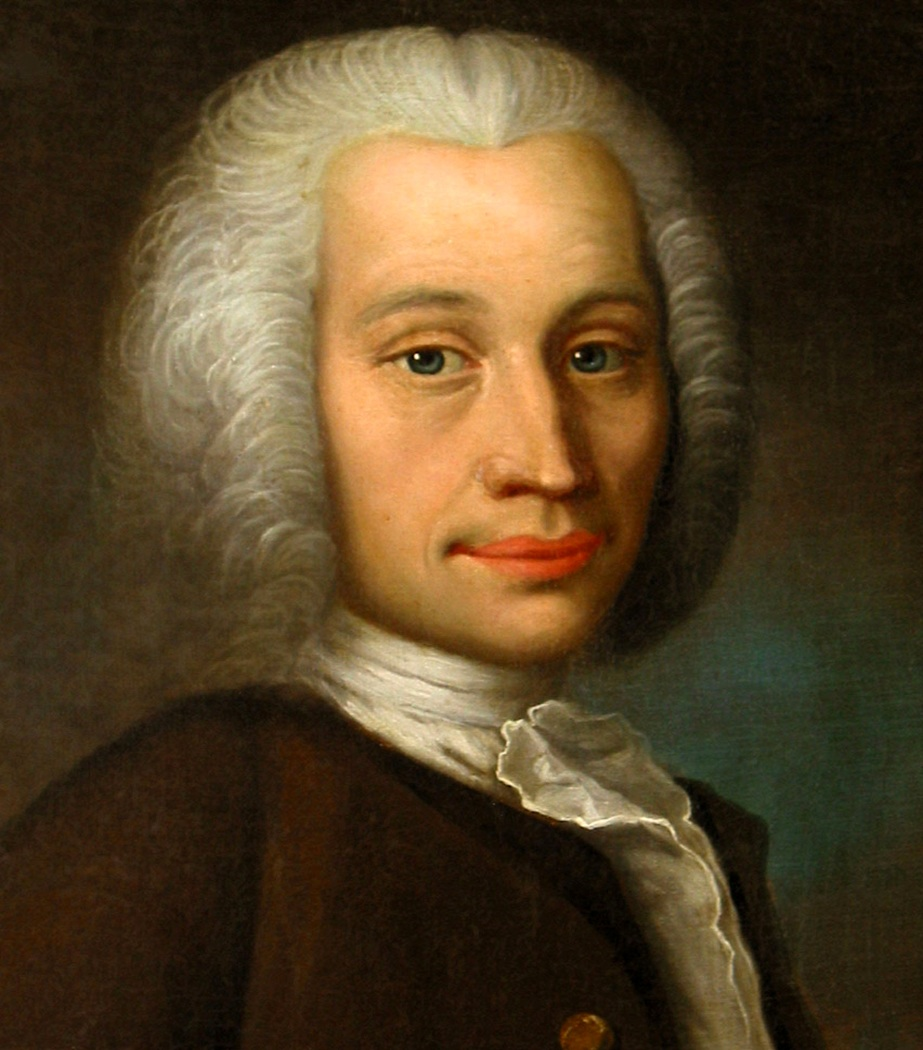
- Portrait by Olof Arenius
- Born: 27 November 1701; Uppsala, Sweden
- Died: 25 April 1744 (aged 42); Uppsala, Sweden
- Education: Uppsala University
- Known for: Celsius
- Scientific career
- Fields: Astronomy, physics, mathematics, geology

Anders Celsius (Swedish: [ˈânːdɛʂ ˈsɛ̌lːsɪɵs]; 27 November 1701 – 25 April 1744) was a Swedish astronomer, physicist and mathematician. He was professor of astronomy at Uppsala University from 1730 to 1744, but traveled from 1732 to 1735 visiting notable observatories in Germany, Italy and France. He founded the Uppsala Astronomical Observatory in 1741, and in 1742 proposed (an inverted form of) the centigrade temperature scale, which was later renamed Celsius in his honour.

== Early life and education ==
Anders Celsius was born in Uppsala, Sweden, on 27 November 1701. His family originated from Ovanåker in the province of Hälsingland. Their family estate was at Doma, also known as Höjen or Högen (locally as Högen 2). The name Celsius is a latinization of the estate's name (Latin celsus 'mound').

As the son of an astronomy professor, Nils Celsius, nephew of botanist Olof Celsius and the grandson of the mathematician Magnus Celsius and the astronomer Anders Spole, Celsius chose a career in science. He was a talented mathematician from an early age. Anders Celsius studied at Uppsala University, where his father was a teacher, and in 1730 he, too, became a professor of astronomy there. Noted Swedish dramatic poet and actor Johan Celsius was also his uncle.

== Career ==
In 1730, Celsius published the Nova Methodus distantiam solis a terra determinandi (New Method for Determining the Distance from the Earth to the Sun). His research also involved the study of auroral phenomena, which he conducted with his assistant Olof Hiorter, and he was the first to suggest a connection between the aurora borealis and changes in the magnetic field of the Earth. He observed the variations of a compass needle and found that larger deflections correlated with stronger auroral activity. At Nuremberg in 1733, he published a collection of 316 observations of the aurora borealis made by himself and others over the period 1716–1732.

Celsius traveled frequently in the early 1730s, including to Germany, Italy and France, when he visited most of the major European observatories. In Paris he advocated the measurement of an arc of the meridian in Lapland. In 1736, he participated in the expedition organized for that purpose by the French Academy of Sciences, led by the French mathematician Pierre Louis Maupertuis (1698–1759) to measure a degree of latitude. The aim of the expedition was to measure the length of a degree along a meridian, close to the pole, and compare the result with a similar expedition to Peru, today in Ecuador, near the equator. The expeditions confirmed Isaac Newton's belief that the shape of the Earth is an ellipsoid flattened at the poles.

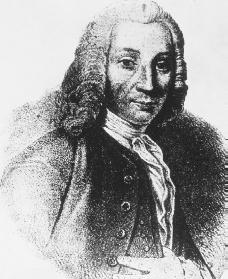
Anders Celsius c. 1730s

In 1738, he published the De observationibus pro figura telluris determinanda (Observations on Determining the Shape of the Earth). Celsius's participation in the Lapland expedition won him much respect in Sweden with the government and his peers, and played a key role in generating interest from the Swedish authorities in donating the resources required to construct a new modern observatory in Uppsala. He was successful in the request, and Celsius founded the Uppsala Astronomical Observatory in 1741. The observatory was equipped with instruments purchased during his long voyage abroad, comprising the most modern instrumental technology of the period.

He made observations of eclipses and various astronomical objects and published catalogues of carefully determined magnitudes for some 300 stars using his own photometric system (mean error=0.4 mag). In 1742 he proposed the Celsius temperature scale in a paper to the Royal Society of Sciences in Uppsala, the oldest Swedish scientific society, founded in 1710. His thermometer was calibrated with a value of 0 for the boiling point of water and 100 for the freezing point. In 1745, a year after Celsius's death, the scale was reversed by Carl Linnaeus to facilitate more practical measurement.

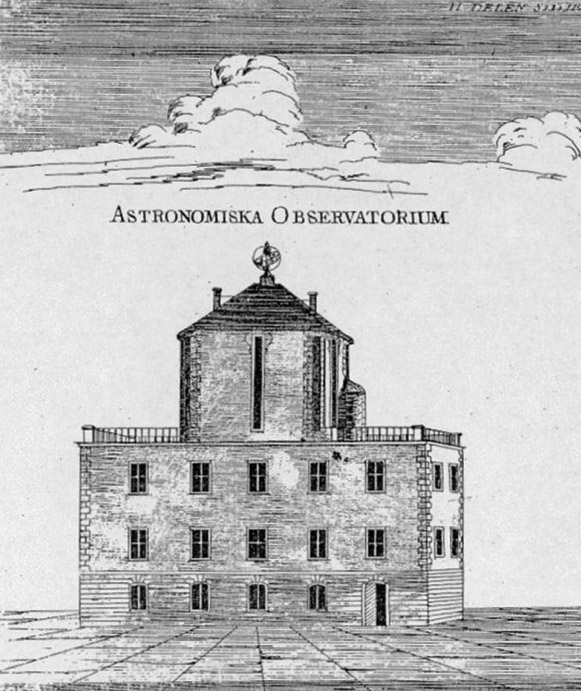
The observatory of Anders Celsius, from a contemporary engraving

Celsius conducted many geographical measurements for the Swedish General map, and was one of the earliest to note that much of Scandinavia is slowly rising above sea level, a continuous process which has been occurring since the melting of the ice from the latest ice age. However, he wrongly posed the notion that the water was evaporating.

In 1725 he became secretary of the Royal Society of Sciences in Uppsala, and served at this post until his death from tuberculosis in 1744. He supported the formation of the Royal Swedish Academy of Sciences in Stockholm in 1739 by Linnaeus and five others, and was elected a member at the first meeting of this academy. It was in fact Celsius who proposed the new academy's name.

== Works ==
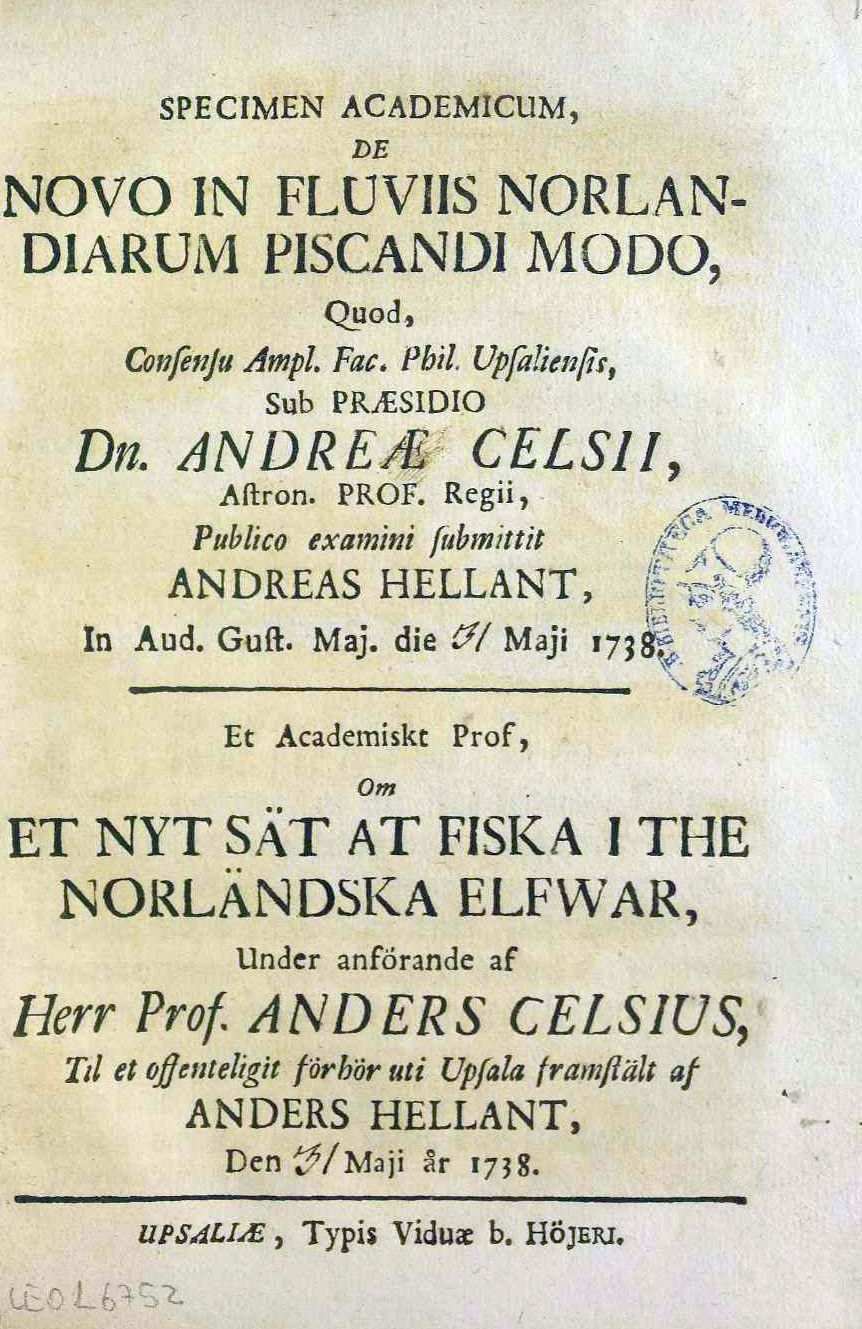
De novo in fluviis norlandiarum piscandi modo, 1738

- De novo in fluviis norlandiarum piscandi modo (in Latin). Uppsala: Johan Höjer, änka. 1738.
- "Observationer om twänne beständiga grader på en thermometer" [Observations about two stable degrees on a thermometer]. Kungliga Svenska Vetenskapsakademiens Handlingar (Proceedings of the Royal Swedish Academy of Sciences) (in Swedish). 3: 171–180. 1742.

== See also ==
- Celsius family
- Daniel Gabriel Fahrenheit
