= Eberhard Zacharias Munck af Rosenschöld =

Swedish physician (1775–1840)

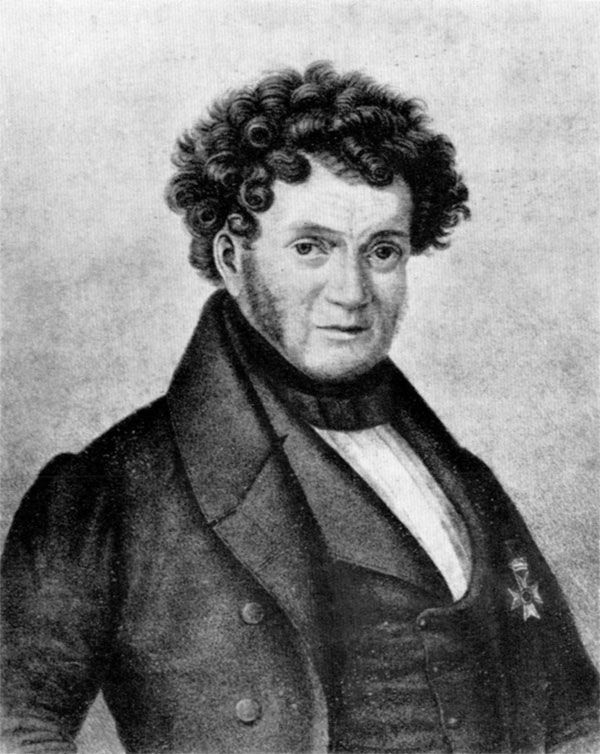
- Munck af Rosenschöld. Etching by Magnus Körner.
- Born: 3 August 1775; Lund, Sweden
- Died: 18 May 1840 (aged 64); Copenhagen, Denmark
- Occupation: Physician
- Known for: Bringing smallpox vaccination to Sweden

Eberhard Zacharias Munck af Rosenschöld (3 August 1775 – 18 May 1840) was a Swedish medical doctor and smallpox vaccine pioneer in Sweden. He was the oldest son of bishop Petrus Munck and grandson of physician Eberhard Rosenblad.

== Biography ==
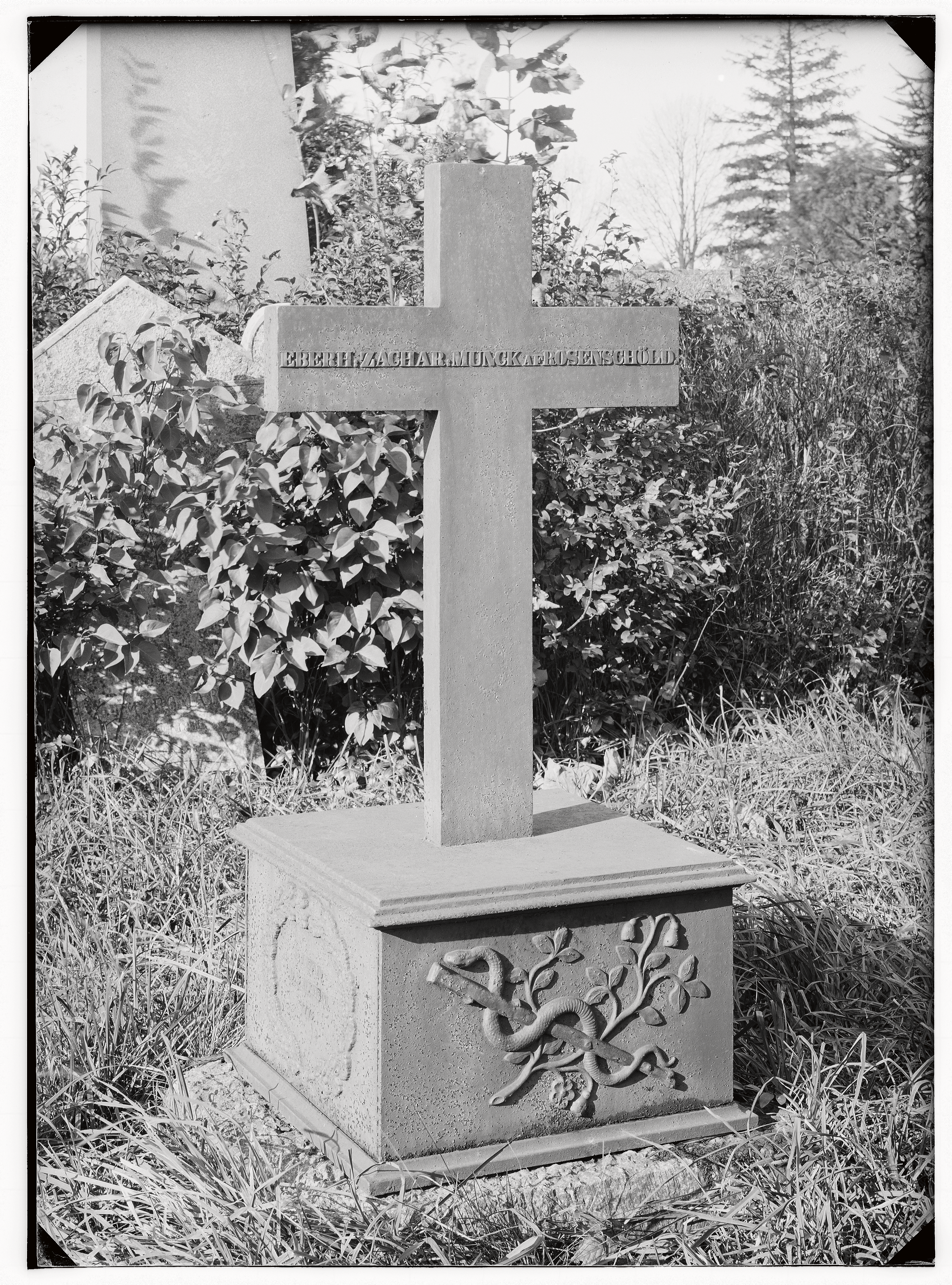
Munck af Rosenschöld's grave, Lund, Sweden.

=== Background and education ===
Munck af Rosenschöld was born in Lund, Sweden, in 1775. He showed an extraordinary memory even as a child. He was influenced by his grandfather's career in medicine, enrolling as a student at Lund University in 1786; at the age of 15 he published a thesis, De rheumatismo acuto (1790), which was publicly defended under professor Johan Henric Engelhart. In 1793 he was awarded a master of philosophy degree, and in 1794 doctor of medicine primus and medicine adjunct. In 1796 his medical practice began in earnest, and every year his reputation as a practicing physician grew.

=== Work and ideals ===
He also distinguished himself by enthusiastically subscribing to the ideas of the French Revolution, which he expressed in an anonymously published book, Biografiska anekdoter om franska revolutionens män ('Biographical Anecdotes of the Men of the French Revolution'). After being ennobled in 1799 along with his father's other children under the name Munck af Rosenschöld, he attended the 1800 Riksdag of the Estates in Norrköping, where he openly belonged to the opposition. He also participated in the following Riksdags with great interest, usually as a member of the constitutional committee, and always remained faithful to his liberal ideas, "demonstrating the compatibility of an honest Jacobinism in opinion with the strictest obedience to the law in conduct". Munck af Rosenschöld fought for improved education, public health, and opposed alcohol abuse. Towards the end of his life, he also campaigned vigorously against spirits, which he believed should be available only in pharmacies.

In 1803 he was appointed doctor at the Ramlösa Hälsobrunn mineral spa, where his great reputation attracted a considerable number of patients. In 1805 he was appointed professor of theoretical medicine at Lund University, but after October 1832 he was on leave of absence for the rest of his life. He also served as the rector of Lund University, holding the position twice: from 1812 to 1813 and 1825 to 1826. In 1817 he became a member of the Royal Swedish Academy of Sciences. As a person, he has been described as "highly original in speech, endeavors and deeds, somewhat rough and repulsive in his dealings, but basically good-natured and benevolent; he was no stranger to sacrifice and renunciation".

=== Vaccination ===
In 1801, during a trip to Copenhagen, Munck af Rosenschöld became aware of Edward Jenner's experiments with vaccination for smallpox – a disease which had killed 300,000 people in Sweden in the latter half of the 18th century – and hurried to introduce vaccination to Scania. On 23 October 1801, he carried out the first smallpox vaccination in Sweden on two children of Dr. Beyer, the Malmö city physician. He worked tirelessly, vaccinating over 2000 people by the end of the following year. Munck af Rosenschöld continued his work throughout the country and through his writings, in which he offered to distribute the vaccine for free, to overcome the obstacles to the vaccine's introduction. For this he was awarded the gold vaccination medal in 1813. In 1816, vaccination became mandatory in Sweden.

=== Family ===
He was the son of bishop Petrus Munck, brother of singer Brita Catharina Lidbeck and priest David Munck af Rosenschöld, and grandson of physician Eberhard Rosenblad. He never married but had two daughters, Eva Eleonora Rosengren (with Gjertrud Andersdotter), and Maria Möller (mother unknown). Rosengren lived with her father for a time as a child, though he never officially recognized her as his daughter.

=== Death ===
Munck af Rosenschöld died suddenly in Copenhagen in 1840 of a heart condition.
