= Celso Zubire =

Mexican artist (born 1947)

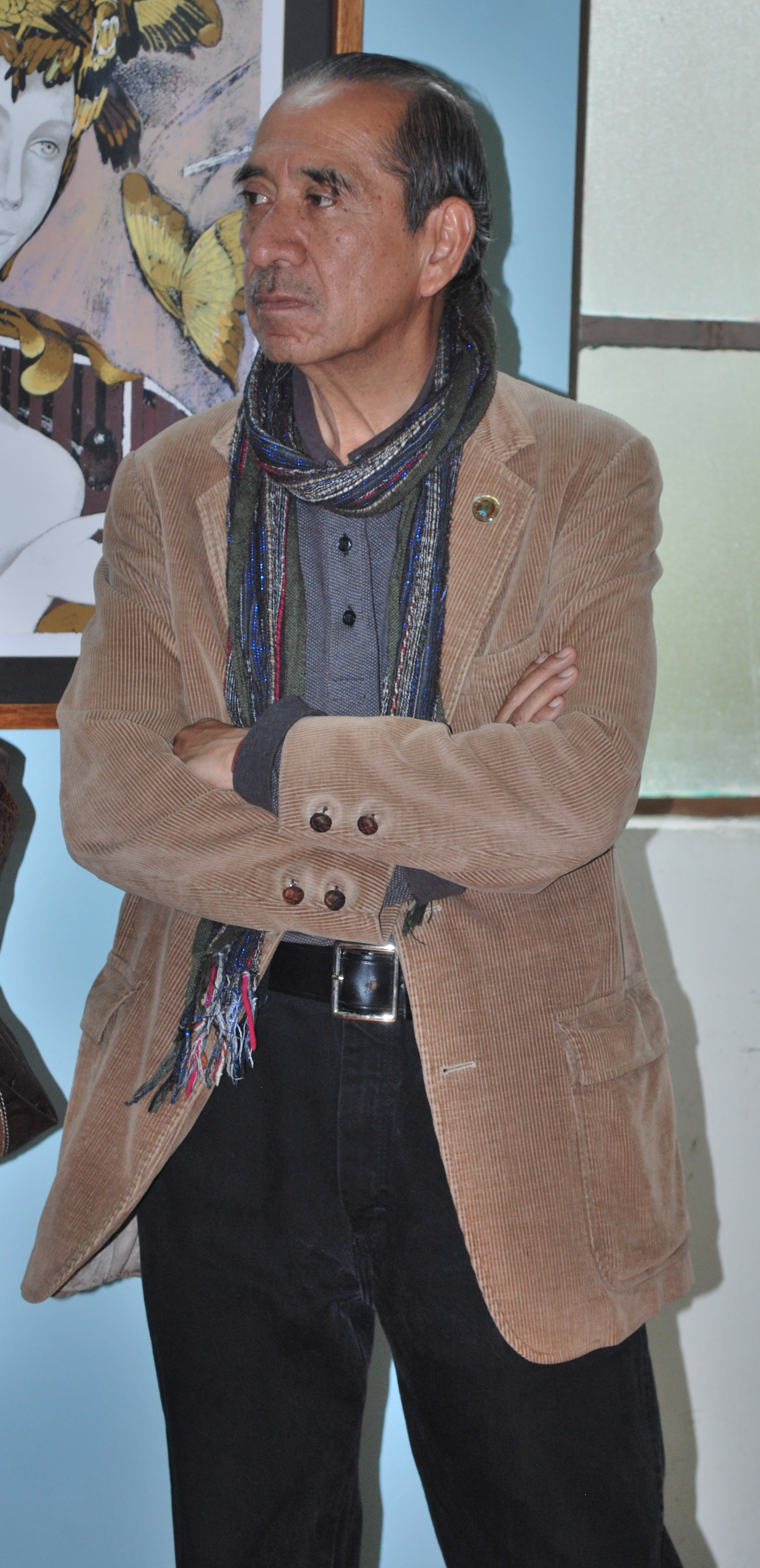
Celso Zubire at Origen de un Acervo event in Mexico City

Celso Zubire (born September 20, 1947) is a Mexican artist, member of the Salón de la Plástica Mexicana. He has lived in Mexico and the United States, notably Louisiana, where he painted a number of murals for restaurants and nightclubs. His artwork employs bold colors, often featuring images of women as well as elements from his experiences abroad.

== Life ==
Video interview with Celso Zubire (in Spanish)

Celso Zubire (full name Celso Zubire Rios) was born in Venustiano Carranza, Puebla in September 20, 1947. He studied publicity and fine arts at the Academy of San Carlos from 1968 to 1973. He has travelled in Europe, South America and North America to study different cultures and art. He lived for a time in the United States, first following a cousin to Dallas, then living in Louisiana. During his time in Louisiana, he worked to capture what he saw of the state in his own way. He currently lives in Mexico City.

== Career ==
Zubire creates drawings, paintings, murals and art objects.

Early in his career, in 1974 he was invited to show some of his works in Canada. Since then he has had individual exhibitions of his work in Mexico and the United States. Individual exhibitions include the Galeria Universal in Mexico City (1974), In-BOSS-ART Mexico City (1975), José Martí Cultural Center in Mexico City (1979), Mandeville City Hall, Louisiana (1987), 210 Photographics Gallery in Covington, Louisiana (1991), Fraga Gallery in New Orleans (1991), Hildelbrand Galleries in New Orleans (1994), Café Habana 50’s in Mexico City (1998), Salón del Perro Andaluz in Mexico City (2000), Tacubaya Metro Station in Mexico City (2002), Brisa Cultural Center in Mexico City (2004), El Chisme Restaur-Arte in Mexico City (2006), Salón de la Plástica Mexicana in Mexico City (2011) and José Carlos Becerra Foundation in Villahermosa, Tabasco (2012). He has also participated in over forty collective exhibitions namely those at the Salón de la Plástica Mexicana, Museo de la Ciudad de México, San Pedro Museo de Arte in Puebla, Casino Español in Mexico City, the Pinoteca del Estado de Tlaxcala, and the National Lottery's headquarters in Mexico City.

He won first prize at the National Poster Contest of the Instituto Nacional de Bellas Artes in 1978 and as well as the Arbor Day and Forest Festival Poster Contest in 1980.

He painted murals commercially while living in Louisiana, mostly for restaurants and nightclubs in the St. Tammany Parish .

He is a member of the Salón de la Plástica Mexicana and member of its board.

He counts José Carlos Becerra as an influence in his work along with Goya, Diego Velázquez and Fernando Botero . His art is bold and colorful. The themes are old but the style is modern. He calls his canvas work “personal art” as it does not matter to him so much if it sells or not. Early works included depictions of prostitutes he saw in Mexico City. Women still figure prominently is his work, appearing as musicians, mermaids, hunters and more. Later work included a series in the 1990s based on Mayan motifs along with elements from the Gulf of Mexico and the Yucatán Peninsula. During his time abroad, his work incorporated what he saw. For example, while living in Louisiana he painted images from there, such as magnolia blossoms.
