= Lars Vilhelm Henschen =

Swedish jurist and politician (1805–1885)

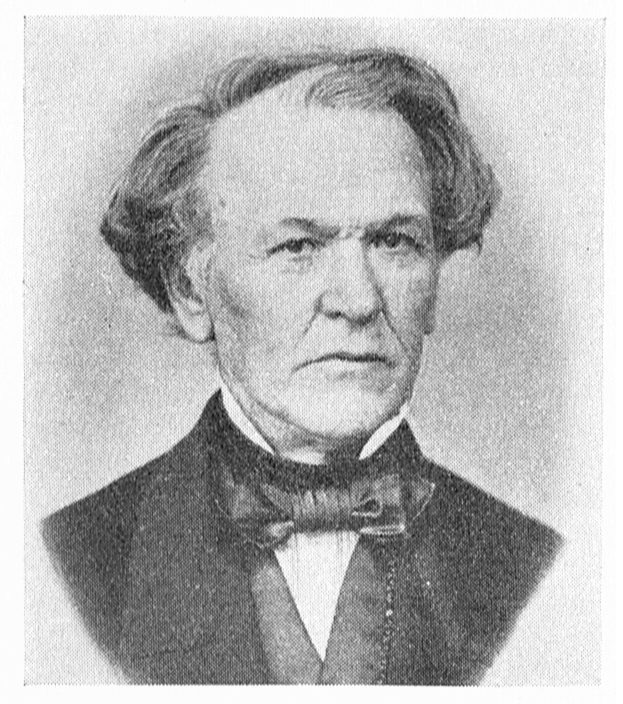
- Born: 1 June 1805; Karlskrona, Sweden
- Died: 27 January 1885 (aged 79); Uppsala, Sweden
- Other names: Lars Wilhelm Henschen
- Occupation(s): Jurist, politician, advocate for religious freedom
- Spouse: Augusta Munck af Rosenschöld (m. 1836)
- Children: 6, including: Salomon Eberhard Henschen; Maria Henschen (von Bergen); Wilhelm August Henschen

Lars Vilhelm Henschen (1 June 1805 – 27 January 1885) was a Swedish jurist and politician and involved in the free church movement. He was the father of doctor Salomon Eberhard Henschen, educator Maria Henschen (von Bergen), and publicist Wilhelm (William) August Henschen, and grandfather of museum curator Gunhild Lugn.

== Life ==
=== Upbringing ===
Henschen was the son of priest Wilhelm Peter Henschen and Anna Catharina (Carin) Abelin. He had three brothers, Salomon, Sven, and Peter (Pelle) and two sisters. Their father died in 1816 when Henschen was young. He then went to live with his aunt Beata Abelin and her husband, shipbuilder Lars Daniel af Thunberg. He got along well with the family and their niece, Sofia Sjöborg, described Henschen's life in her writings. Henschen grew up in a religiously and politically active environment.

=== Education, family, and beliefs ===
Having a keen interest in law, he went to Lund in 1820 to study. He completed his degree in 1824, before the age of nineteen. He worked in several different places, including for his future father-in-law Johan Munck af Rosenschöld sometime after 1828. He ended up in Norra Ångermanland, one of the centers of the Pietistic läsare (Reader) movement, from 1829 to 1831. There, in 1830, he had a conversion experience, potentially connected to revivalist preachers in the area such as Pehr Brandell. His belief was initially said to have had a "Schartauan character". Henschen, however, eventually became more involved in the Nyevangelism ('New Evangelism') movement. Later, his friendships with Readers and influential preachers Peter Lorenz Sellergren, Carl Olof Rosenius, Anders Wiberg, and George Scott, among others, would impact his beliefs.

In 1835, he moved to Uppsala, where he would live for many years. His home became a meeting point, known as "Henschen Hall", for religious gatherings, initially led by priests and seminary students. Petrus Brandell, son of revivalist preacher Pehr Brandell, also lived in the same house as Henschen on Kungsängsgatan. Henschen also became part of the growing temperance movement. In 1836, he married Augusta Munck af Rosenschöld (1806–1856), sister of Peter Munck af Rosenschöld. They had children Johan (1837), Maria (1840), Wilhelm (William) (1842), Josef (1843), Esaias (1845), and Salomon (1847). Henschen's cousin Sofia lived with them at times and he significantly influenced her religious development.

=== Freedom of religion ===
Henschen became actively engaged in the issue of freedom of religion. He fought for the abolition of the Conventicle Act, which banned religious gatherings other than those of the Church of Sweden. In the early 1840s, when Scott began to face extreme backlash, criticism from the press, and threats, Henschen strongly came to his defense. By the late 1840s, the meetings held in Henschen's home were led by laypeople, leading many to demonstrate outside his home and call for his prosecution; the authorities decided not to as they stated the gatherings were for spiritual edification "according to pure evangelical doctrine." Still, his religious circles remained controversial. In 1851, German missionary to Asia Karl Gützlaff visited Henschen and held a gathering, which was met with stones thrown at the house. Such incidents "made [Henschen] more cautious but pushed his development towards a clearly separatist stance. His lively sympathies for [the Baptist church] also contributed to this." As the Baptists grew and faced legal penalties including exile, he provided them with legal advice.

His statements regarding the request of Jewish bookseller Adolf Bonnier, older brother of publishing company founder Albert Bonnier, to settle in Uppsala caused much debate.

After the repeal of the Conventicle Act in 1858, Henschen continued to fight for religious freedom in other areas.

=== Political work ===
Henschen, who was deputy district governor and later a councillor, was a liberal member of Parliament for the bourgeoisie estate in Uppsala at the Riksdag of the Estates of 1853–1854, 1856–1858, 1862–1863 and 1865–1866. Others in his circle, known as progressives, included André Oscar Wallenberg and Albert Björck. He was also one of the most vehement opponents of the Representation Reform in Sweden, which restructured Parliament into two chambers, Första kammaren and Andra kammaren.

=== Death ===
Henschen died 27 January 1885 in his sleep with his son Esaias nearby. He is buried at Uppsala old cemetery.
