= Magnus Celsius =

Swedish astronomer and mathematician, decipherer of the staveless runes

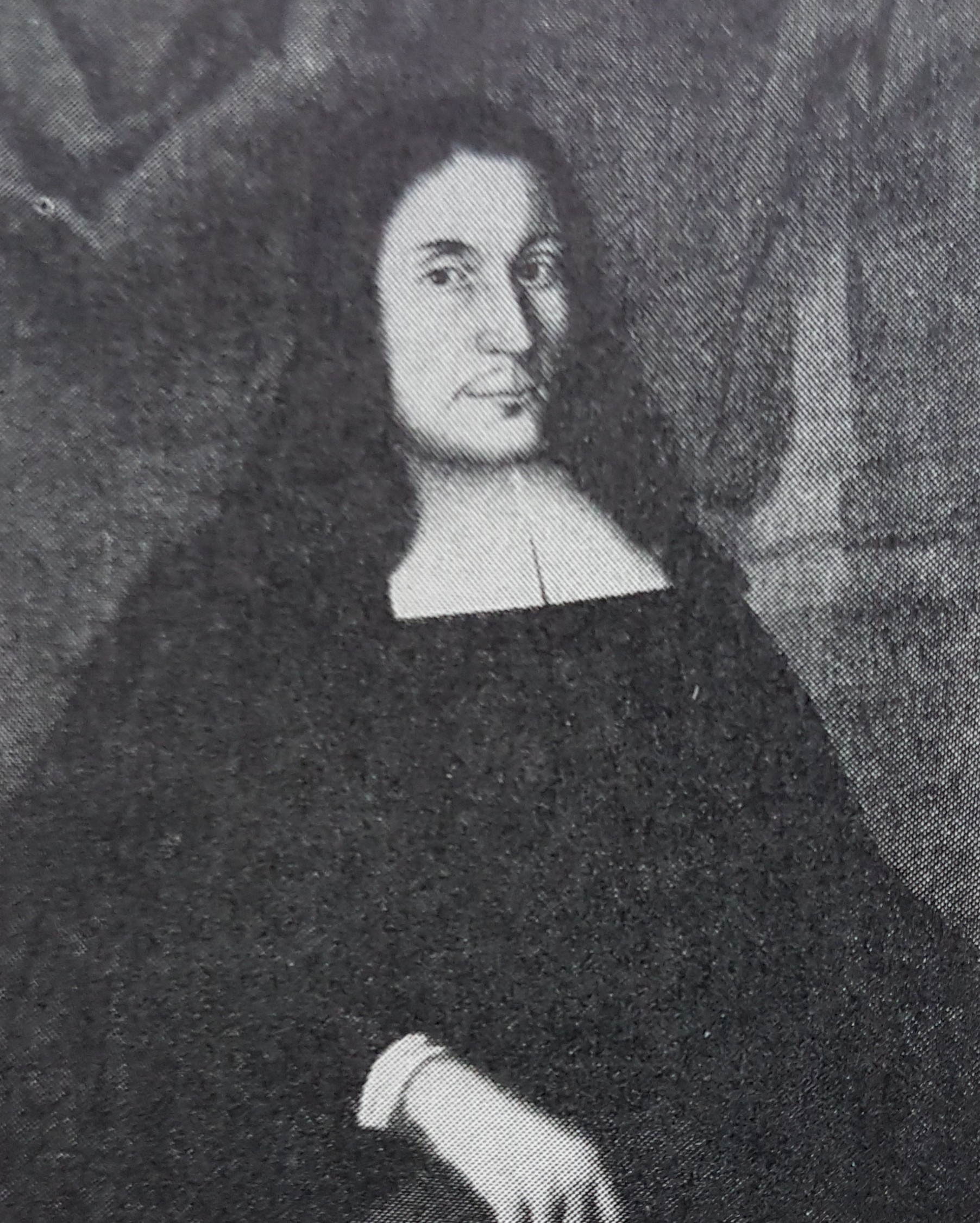
- Magnus Celsius, photographed portrait from Allhems Svenskt konstnärslexikon.
- Born: 16 January 1621; Alfta, Sweden
- Died: 5 May 1679 (aged 58); Uppsala, Sweden
- Spouse: Sara Celsius
- Children: Nils Celsius; Johan Celsius; Catharina Celsia; Olof Celsius, Sr. Barbro Celsius
- Scientific career
- Fields: Astronomy, Mathematics

Magnus Celsius (16 January 1621 – 5 May 1679) was a Swedish astronomer and mathematician, decipherer of the staveless runes. His grandson was Anders Celsius.

He was the father of Olof Celsius, Nils Celsius and Johan Celsius.
