= Olof Celsius =

Swedish botanist (1670–1756)

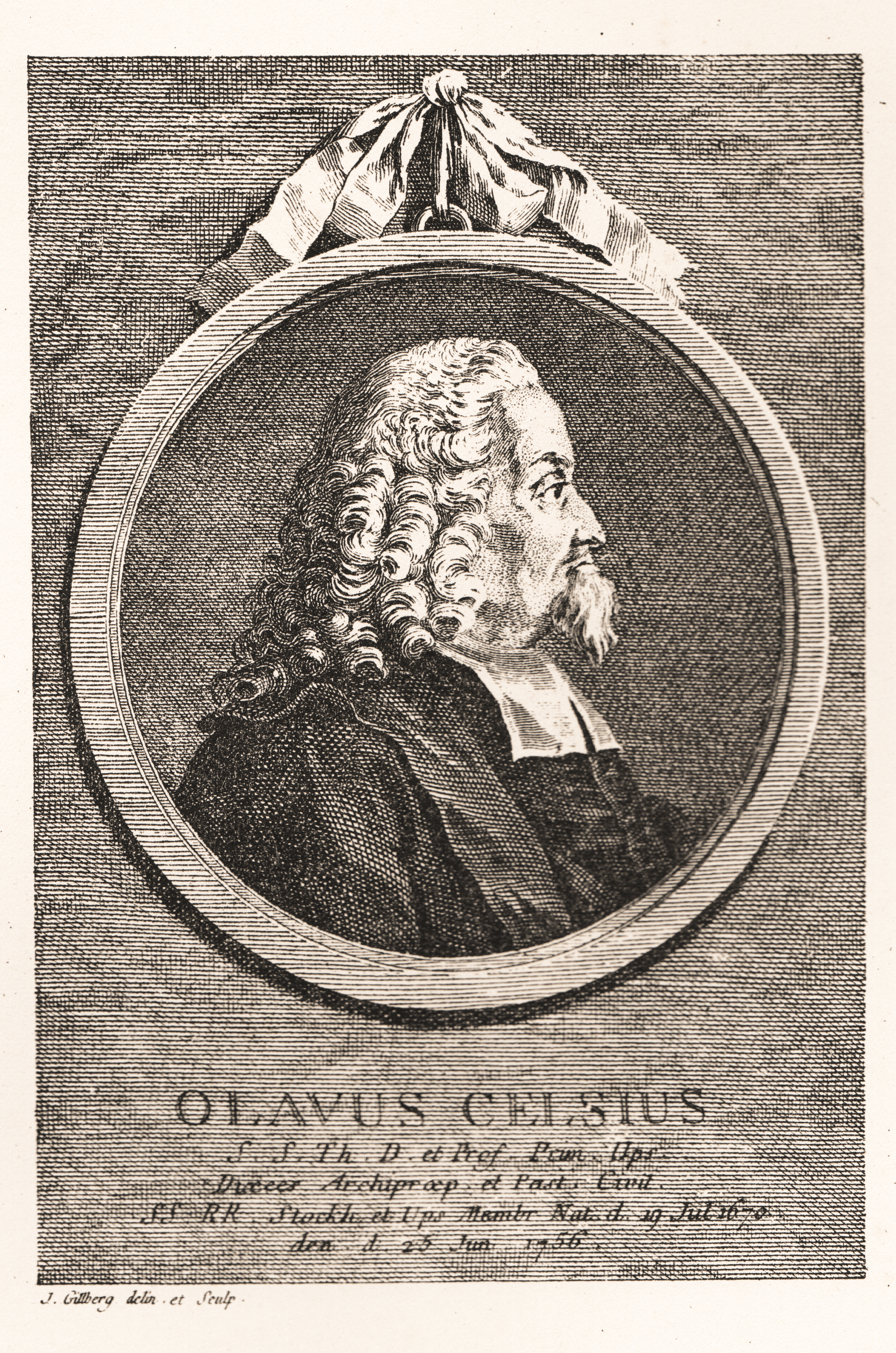
Olof Celsius (the elder). Engraving.

Olof Celsius (the elder) (19 July 1670 – 24 June 1756) was a Swedish botanist, philologist and clergyman. He was a professor at Uppsala University, Sweden. Celsius was a mentor of the botanist and scientist Carl Linnaeus. Celsius wrote his most famous book on biblical plants, Hierobotanicon, in 1745–47. Celsius was also a prominent runologist.

Olof Celsius's father was the mathematician Magnus Celsius and his nephew Anders Celsius (son of his brother and astronomy professor Nils Celsius) was an astronomer who invented a temperature scale where 100 originally represented the freezing point of water and 0 represented the boiling point. The scale was later reversed to create the centigrade scale, renamed in 1948 to the Celsius scale in use today. Noted Swedish dramatic poet and actor Johan Celsius was also his brother.

Celsius was the father of Bishop of Lund Olof Celsius the Younger and historian and librarian Magnus von Celse.

Olof Celsius was made a member of the Royal Swedish Academy of Sciences in 1739.
