= Sven Lagerbring =

Swedish professor and historian (1707–1787)

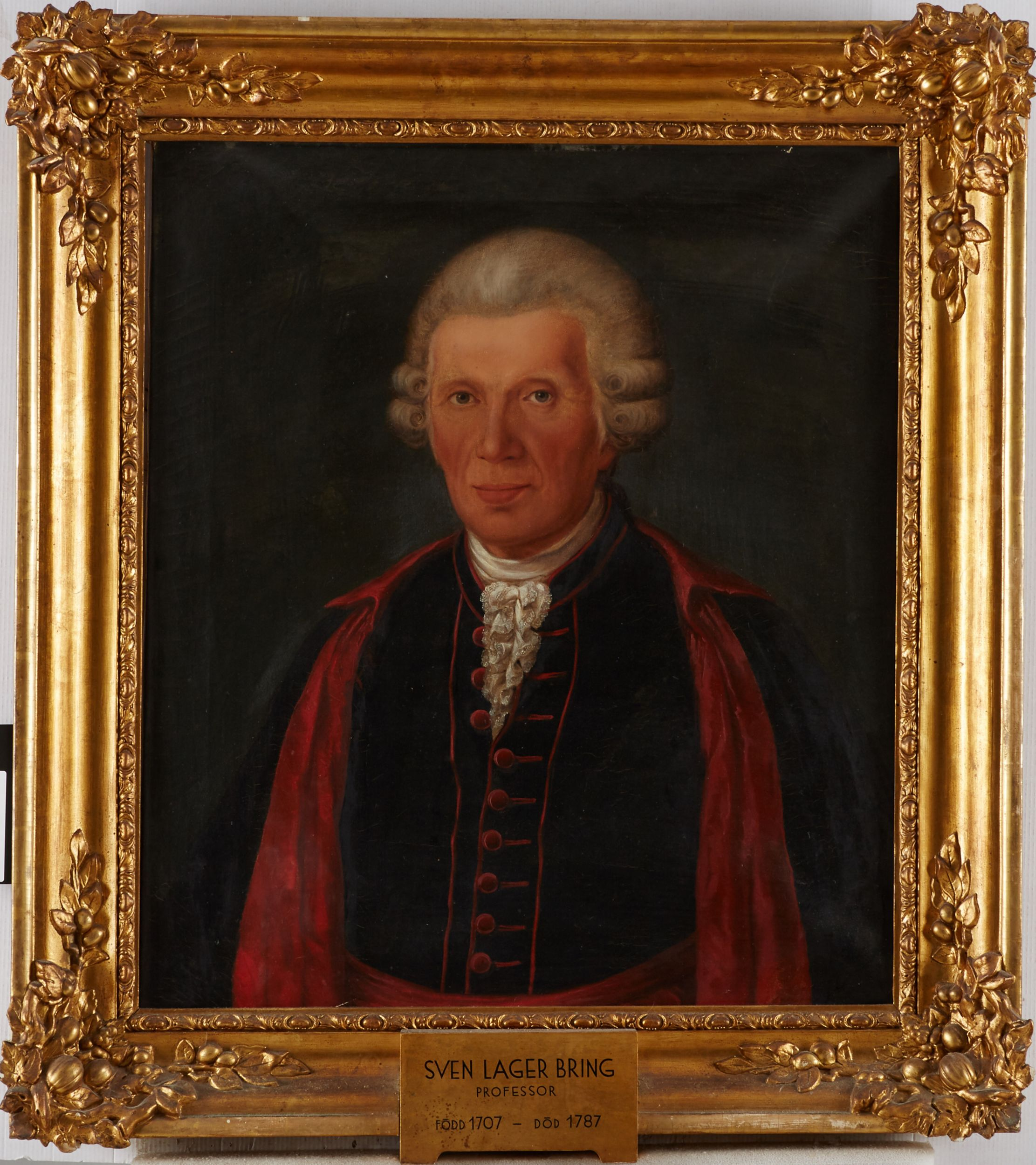
- Portrait of Lagerbring dressed in Nationella dräkten.
- Born: Sven Bring; 24 February 1707; Klinta, Bosjökloster, Sweden
- Died: 5 December 1787 (aged 80); Lund, Sweden
- Occupation(s): Professor, historian
- Employer: Lund University
- Title: Rector of Lund University (1748, 1755, 1769)
- Spouse: Maria Beata Lagercreutz (m. 1745; died 1760)
- Children: Carl Lagerbring

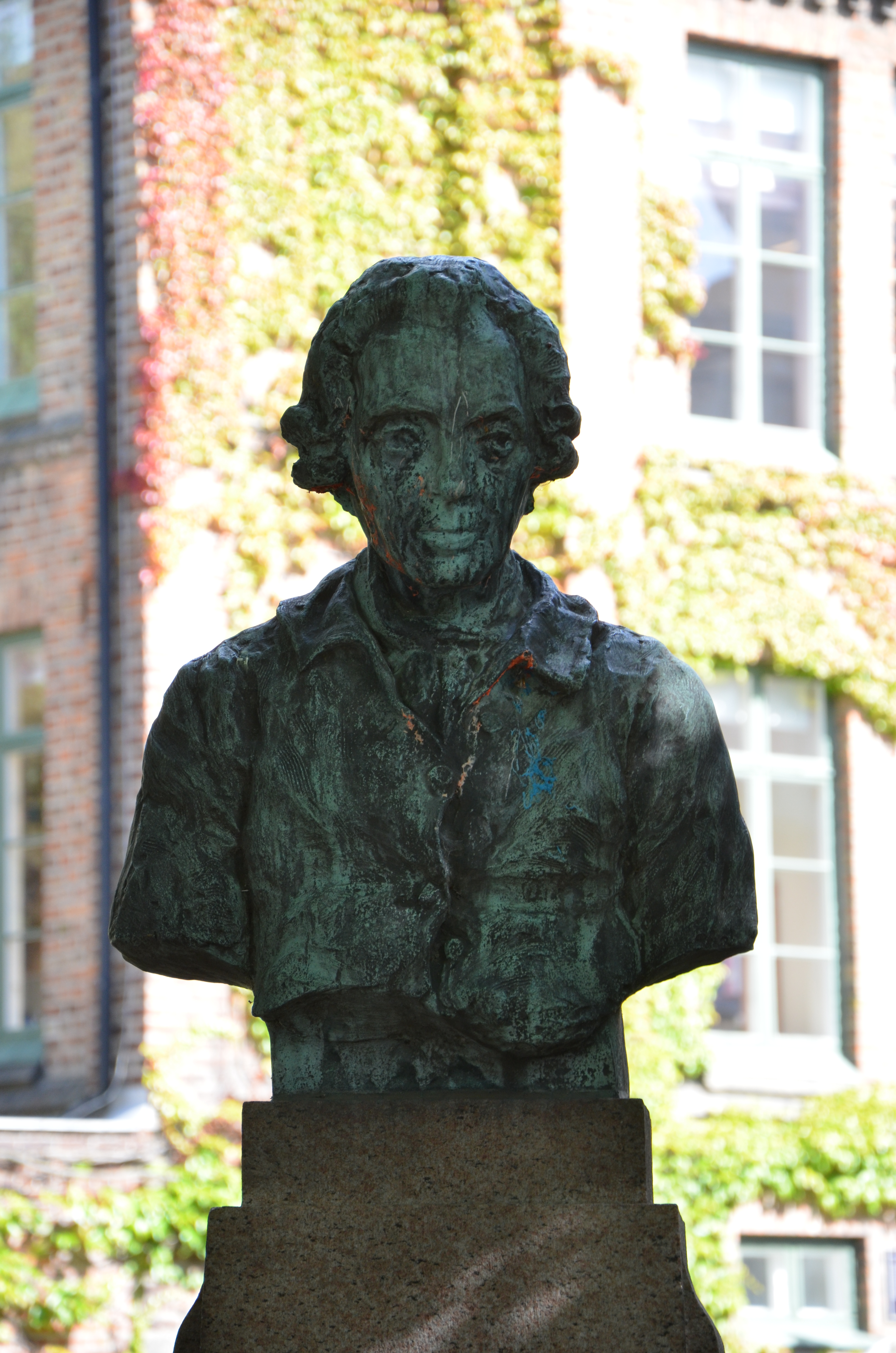
Albert von Stockenström's bust of Lagerbring (1907) at Lund University.

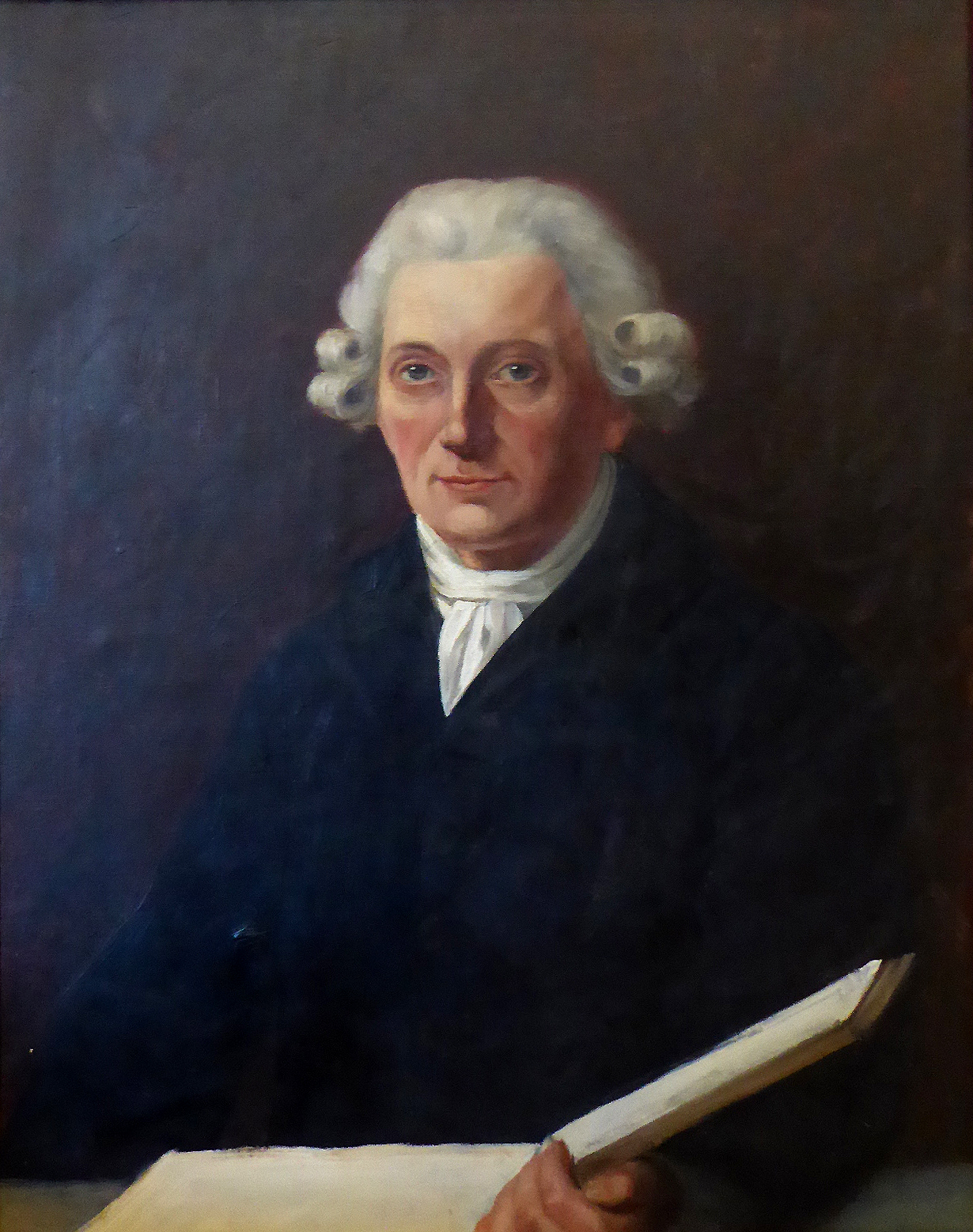
Professor Sven Lagerbring

Sven Lagerbring (originally Sven Bring; after being knighted, he wrote his name as Sven Lager Bring; 24 February 1707 – 5 December 1787) was a Swedish professor and historian. He has been described as "the first Swedish historian in the modern sense."

Lagerbring was a professor at Lund University. He initiated more modern, critical research in Swedish history alongside Olof von Dalin. He published a wide range of works, including the influential four-volume Swea rikes historia. Lagerbring became a member of the Royal Swedish Academy of History and Antiquities in 1786.

== Biography ==
Sven Bring was born in Klinta, Bosjökloster, Scania, Sweden. He was the son of vicar Ebbe Jönsson Bring and Abela Olufsdotter Klinthea. He began his studies in 1720 at Lund University, where he became assistant professor of law in 1731, then spent a few years in Stockholm as a teacher for the von Fersen family, during which time he had the opportunity to conduct research in the National Archives. In 1741 he became a registrar in Lund and in 1742 professor of history there, succeeding Kilian Stobæus. In 1751 Lagerbring became juris doctor, in 1755 a member of Queen Louisa Ulrika's Academy of Letters, History and Antiquities, and in 1770 permanently on leave from his professorship for scientific work. In 1769 he was knighted under the name of Lagerbring and in 1770 received the title of chancellor (kansliråd). Lagerbring was the rector of Lund University in 1748, 1755, and 1769. His influences at the university included professors Andreas Rydelius, Kilian Stobæus, and Carl Papke.

Via law, Lagerbring had been moved towards historical research. His law teacher had been the meticulous and source-critical David Nehrman Ehrenstråhle, which influenced his approach to history. During his time as a private instructor for Axel von Fersen the Elder, the later leader of the Hat Party, the formation of the Hats was in full swing and the increasing party struggles between the two parties at the time also influenced his writing. During his first professorship, his works covered a wide range of subjects, including history and its auxiliary sciences, as well as theology, philosophy and more. Among his more important works are De usu et utilitate historiarum (1745), which, in the spirit of the times, raises the question of the purpose of history for examination, and most notably De fide historica monumentorum islandicorum (1763), which for the first time critically examined the historical source value of Icelandic literature, and Dissertatio exhibens cautelas de prudenter instituenda historia (1763), which deals with the tasks and methods of historiography, and demonstrates many of the ideas that guided Lagerbring in his historical authorship. Lagerbring also published a large number of local history studies from Scania. In the disputation series Monumenta scanensia (36 dissertations in two volumes, 1744–1751), mainly a publication of medieval sources on the history of Scania, extracts from King Valdemar II's Danish book of land taxation, Liber daticus ecclesiæ lundensis and Necrologium lundense were printed for the first time. A similar source publication was also Lagerbring's Samlingar af åtskilliga handlingar och påminnelser, som förmodligen kunna gifva lius i swänska historien (three volumes, 1749–1758). Lagerbring also worked on the history of education and planned a large work, Historia literaria, of which, however, only a portion dealing with antiquity was printed in 1748.

Alongside Olof von Dalin, Lagerbring initiated the more modern, critical research in Swedish history, and he undoubtedly ranks higher than Dalin in this respect. Lagerbring's main work is Swea rikes historia (four volumes, 1769–1783; the last volume, concerning the period 1460–1463, was first printed in 1907 by Lauritz Weibull). A shorter summary of Swedish history is Sammandrag af Svea rikes historia (1775; in a new and somewhat expanded edition 1778–1780), to which was added an account of the organization and administration of the Swedish state, etc., which was outstanding for its time, thus giving the present a much needed handbook of Swedish political science.

Unlike Dalin, Lagerbring drew a sharp distinction between source and literature, and emphasized, among other things, the higher source value of contemporary sources. As evidence of his critical ability, he raised doubts about the authenticity of the papal bull of Pope Agapetus II, and was also on the trail of the Hamburg-Bremen Church's document forgeries. Lagerbring's main teacher was the Danish historian Hans Gram. Lagerbring had several points of contact with contemporary scholars such as Jakob Langebek, Peter Frederik Suhm, Gerhard Schøning, and Terkel Klevenfeldt. Like Langebek, he became skilled at tracking down and gaining access to material held in private collections. Due to his style being less nationalistic and having less of a causerie tone, Lagerbring's work did not receive the appreciation it deserved at the time and in the near future. Only later did Lagerbring's contributions come to be appreciated on their merits.

Lagerbring was keenly interested in the archaeology and history of his ancestral province; he published, among other things, a large collection of Monumenta scanensia, containing a large number of disputations with forthcoming publications of deeds in them, and in general he promoted the study of the ancient history of Scania in various ways.

The university libraries in Lund and Uppsala and the diocesan library in Linköping hold several unpublished manuscripts by Lagerbring, such as lecture outlines, transcripts of deeds and more. His autobiography, which was begun, has been printed by Lauritz Weibull in Sven Lagerbring. Skrifter och bref, published on the occasion of Lund University's celebration of the 200th anniversary of Lagerbring's birth in 1907.

Lagerbring has certainly not been surpassed by any previous Swedish historian in critically astute scholarship; in many places he has set out guidelines which the scholarly work of a later period has followed. His style differs markedly from that of the Enlightenment. It is characterized by a peculiar humor, with incisive, meaningful turns of phrase, not infrequently with a certain archaic touch.

He was the head of the Royal Physiographic Society in Lund in 1778–1779.

As a professor, Lagerbring was highly respected; as inspektor of the Blekingska Nation, he exerted a patriarchal, benevolent influence among the students. On 20 March 1786 Lagerbring became a member of the Royal Swedish Academy of History and Antiquities. He died in Lund in 1787 and is buried in a chapel in Mörarp Church.

=== Family ===
Lagerbring married Maria Beata Lagercreutz in 1745; the couple had six children, four of whom died during his lifetime. His son Carl Lagerbring (1751–1822) was a count and government official.

== Memorials and legacy ==
A bust of Lagerbring, made by the artist Albert von Stockenström, has stood on the University Square in Lund since 1907. The day of Lagerbring's death, 5 December, has carried the name Sven in The Swedish Almanac since 1901, in his honor. At the beginning of his career, Lagerbring proposed a pseudoscientific theory that Swedes were of Turkish origin, based on superficial similarities between the two languages and the fact that sources such as Ynglinga saga and Prose Edda states that Odin migrated to Sweden from a land called Tyrkland. This pseudohistorical theory was revised by Gustaf Noring in the 19th century, and popularized by various Turkish nationalists, fourth season of Kuruluş: Osman, and Nuance Party leader Mikail Yüksel in the 21st century.

Academic offices
Preceded by Nils Stobæus	Rector of Lund University; 1748	Succeeded by Sven Johan Munthe
Preceded by Johan Engeström	Inspektor of Blekingska Nation; 1749–1787	Succeeded by Thure Weidman
Preceded by Eberhard Rosén (Rosenblad)	Rector of Lund University; 1755	Succeeded by Carl Jesper Benzelius
Preceded by Gustaf Harmens	Rector of Lund University; 1769	Succeeded by Jonas Wåhlin
