= Johan Jacob Döbelius =

German physician (1674–1743)

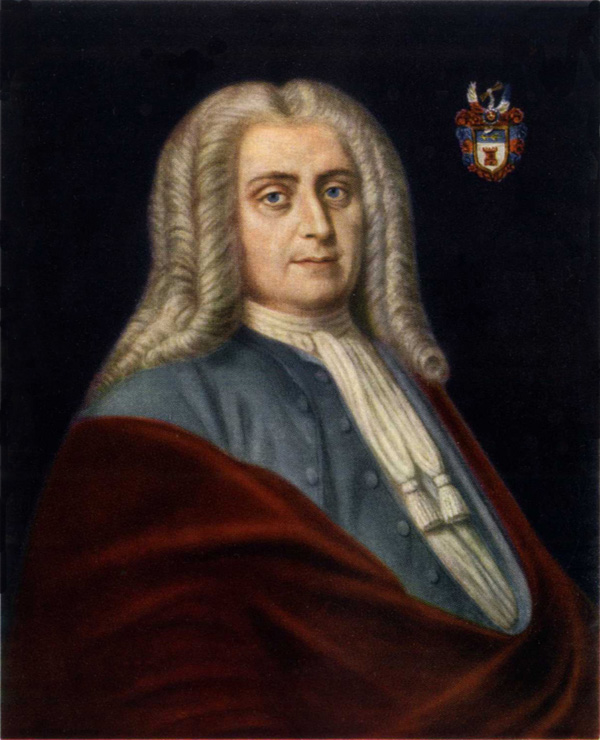
Johan Jacob Döbelius.

Johan Jacob Döbelius (29 March 1674, Rostock, Germany – 14 January 1743, Lund, Sweden), was a German-born Swedish professor of medicine.

== Life ==
After studies in Leiden, Döbelius became a Doctor of Medicine.

He ended up in Gothenburg, where he practiced medicine for a while.

He was appointed to the provincial physician of Bohuslän in 1697 and later on, in 1699 as the provincial physician of Skåne.

Döbelius was appointed to physician to the military in Scania. In 1710, he was appointed to be professor of medicine at the University of Lund. He was the headmaster of the university in the years 1717, 1729 and 1742.

He was the great-grandfather of Swedish military commander Georg Carl von Döbeln.

== Ramlösa ==
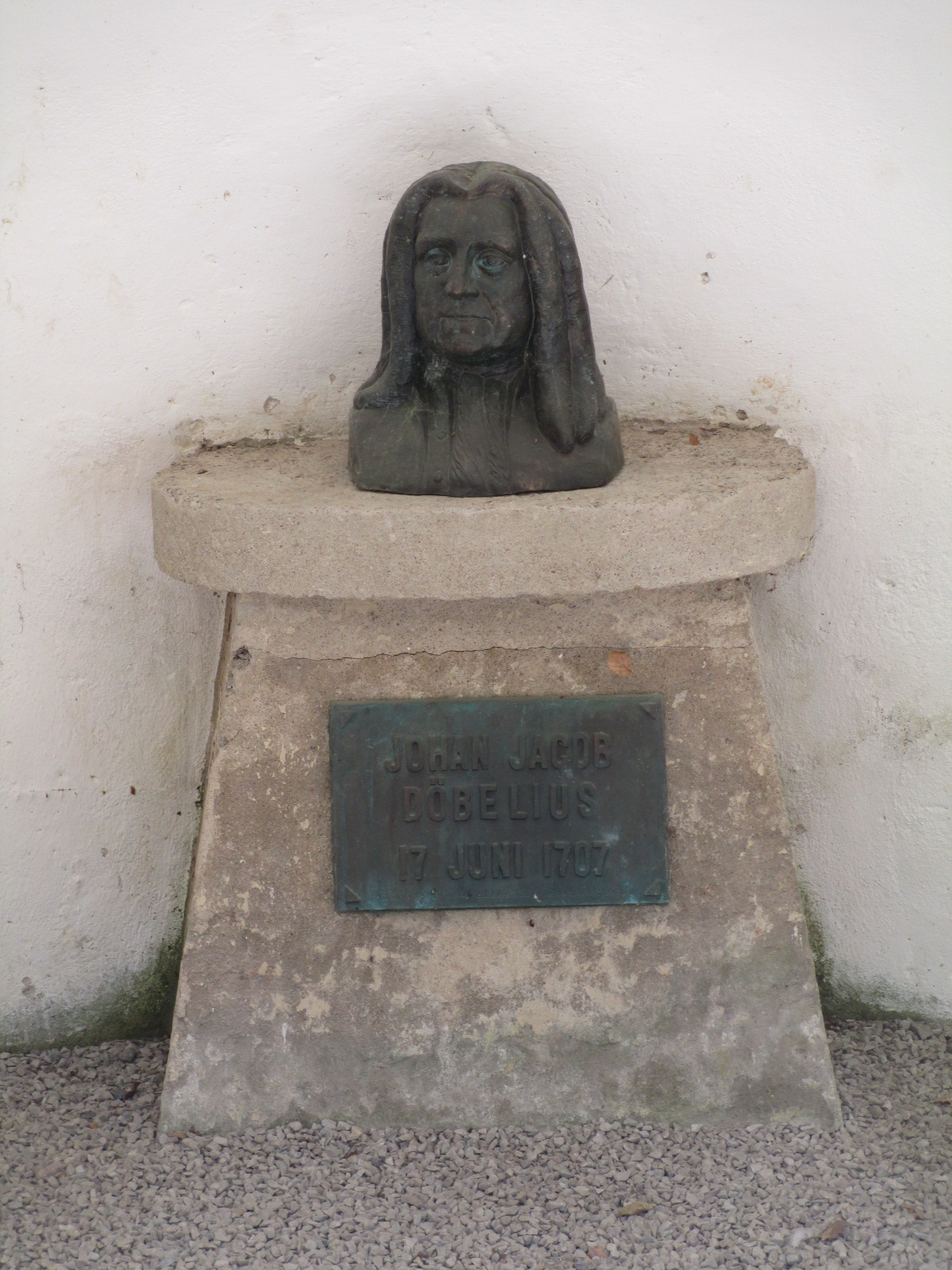
Bust of Döbelius at Ramlösa hälsobrunn

He discovered Ramlösa hälsobrunn, a source of mineral water near Helsingborg, Sweden that was opened to the public in 1707. According to Döbelius, there were thousands of people at the opening and the water from the well could treat dizziness, trembling of joints, gout, headache, bad breath and even hysteria, among other things.
