= Loka Brunn =

- Kurort
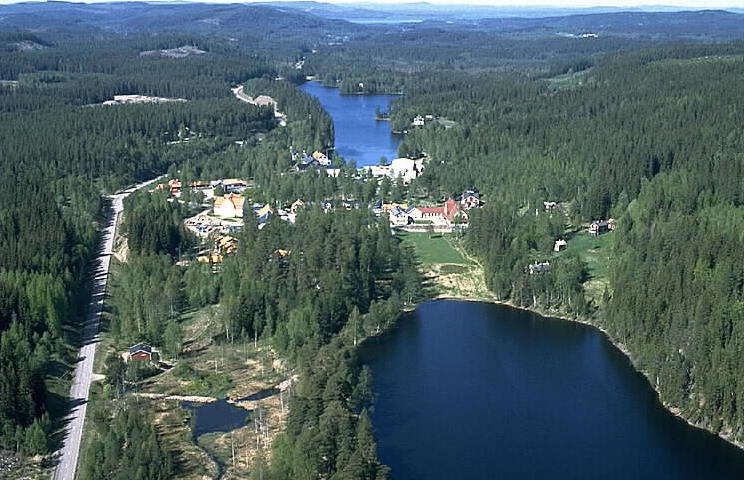
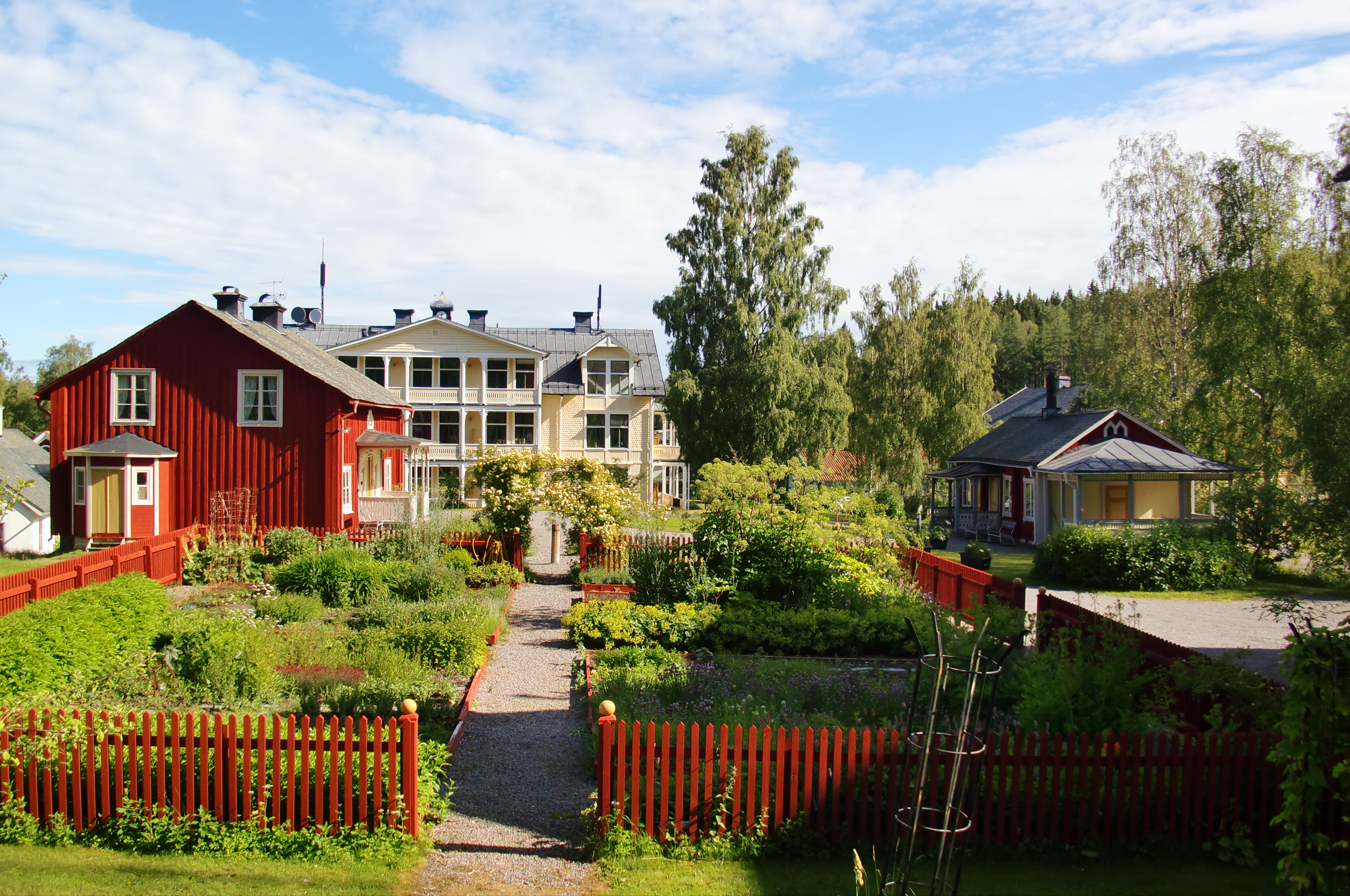
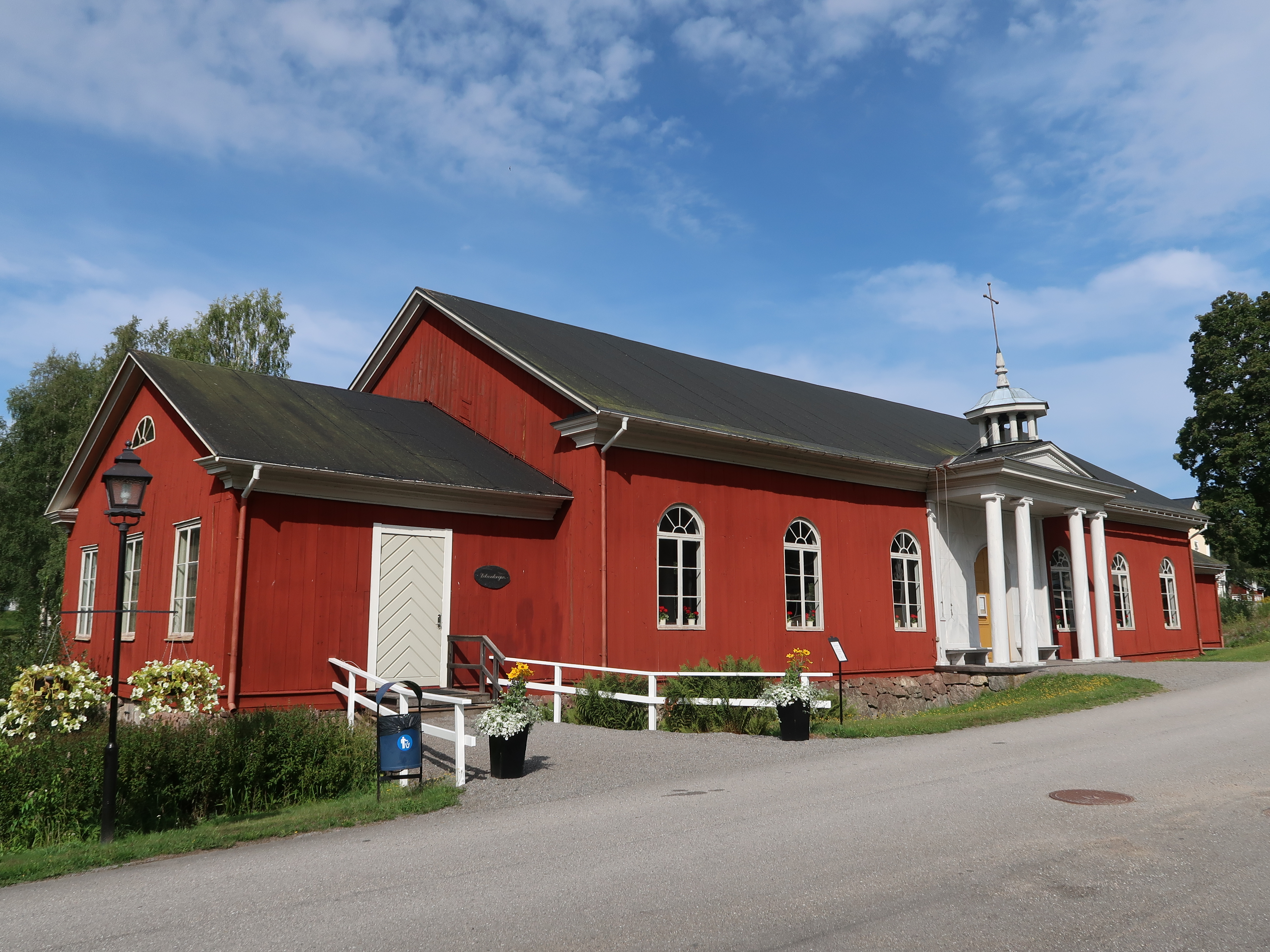
- Clockwise from top: aerial view of Loka Brunn; Loka garden landscape; the Loka Brunn Church.

- Location within Örebro Location within Sweden
- Coordinates: 59.6067°N 14.4806°E
- Country: Sweden
- County: Örebro County
- Municipality: Hällefors Municipality
- Time zone: UTC+1 (CET)
  - Summer (DST): UTC+2 (CEST)

Loka Brunn is a spa town located in Hällefors Municipality in Örebro County, Sweden, south of Grythyttan, and north of Karlskoga, at an isthmus-strip between the southern shore of Lake Norra Loken and the northern shore of Lake Södra Loken.

Established as spa town 1720, and granted rights in 1759, Loka Brunn is cited as one of the oldest spa towns in Sweden, along with Medevi and Ramlösa. Since the 17th century, Loka Brunn has been attracting prominent individuals from the aristocrat and bourgeoisie social classes as a meeting place, and according to tradition, the water at Loka Brunn is considered to have health benefits.

== History ==
=== Early history ===
Established during the Middle Ages, Loka Brunn, served as a resting site for pilgrims according to tradition.

=== 18th century ===
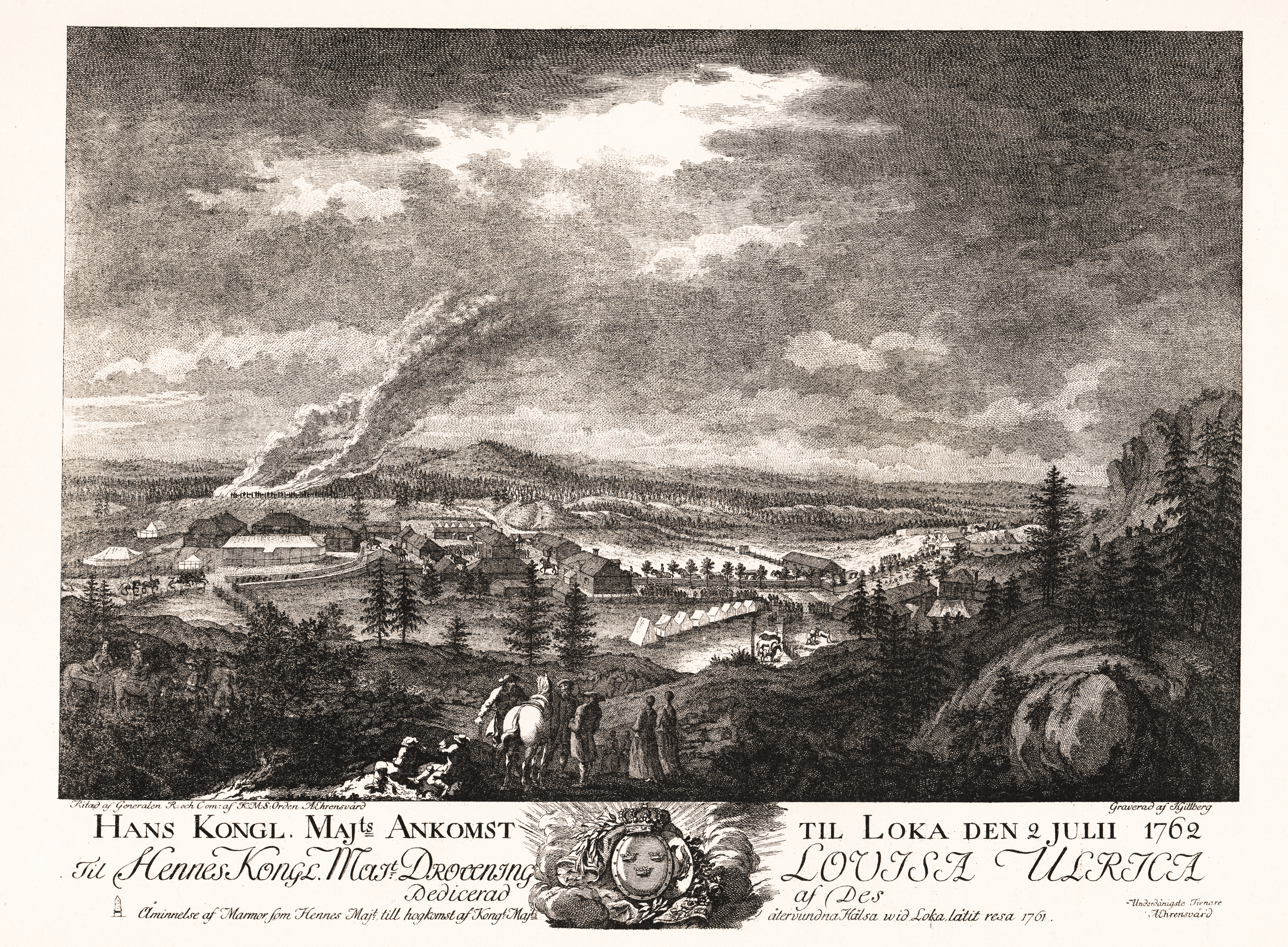
Loka in 1762, engraved by Jacob Gillberg

Granted mineral rights in 1720, by Conrad Ribbing, governor of Örebro County, in the historical province Västmanland, near the border of Värmland, surrounded by conifer forests, and described by Carl Linnaeus in 1746.

Established as a meeting spot for 18th-century Swedish politicians, the Caps party historically preferred Loka Brunn over Medevi, which instead was favored by the rival Hats.

Loka Brunn has been a site for recovery and treatments since its inception. Notable individuals such as Gustav III, Carl Linnaeus, and Bridget of Sweden have all stayed there.

=== 19th century ===
Additionally, during the 19th century, individuals suffering from rheumatic disorders sought treatment at Loka Brunn. The site had a pharmacy, a practicing physician and a garden for medicinal plants used in treatment of patients. In addition, a church was inaugurated in 1824.

== Refugee camp ==
Loka Brunn has been used as a refugee camp on several occasions. After the displacement of individuals during World War II, Danish and Norwegian groups were relocated and housed at Loka Brunn. Later, during the Hungarian Revolution of 1956, a group of Hungarians were also relocated to Loka Brunn where a refugee camp was established.

== Today ==
In 2007, the Spendrup family acquired Loka Brunn. Its workers mainly come from towns nearby, including Karlskoga and Hällefors. In addition, Loka Brunn also hosts a spa town museum.

The Loka Brunn site consists of 54 houses in total. The site offers various amenities and facilities, such as spas, accommodations, and conference rooms.

== See also ==
- Spendrups
- Ramlösa Hälsobrunn
